= HMS Exmoor (L08) =

Destroyer of the Royal Navy

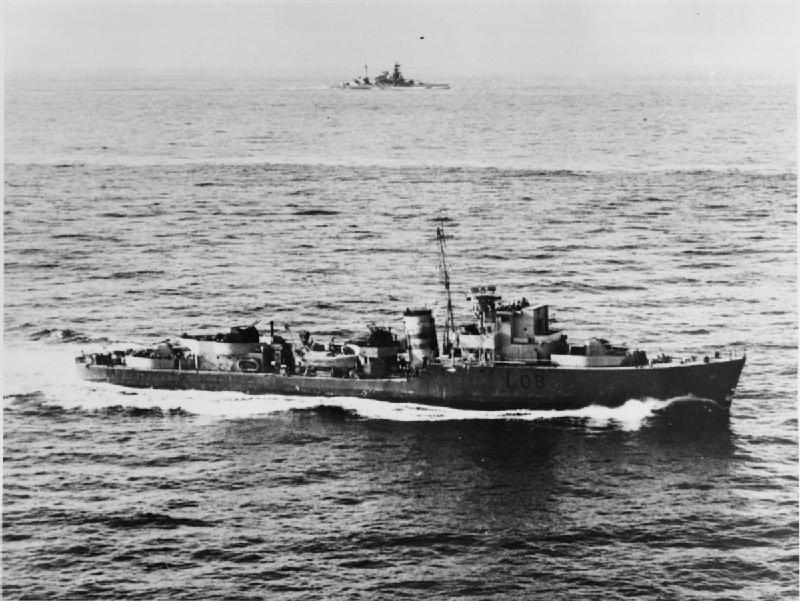
- HMS Exmoor (foreground) on 11 February 1942.

History

United Kingdom
- Name: HMS Burton
- Namesake: A fox hunt in Derbyshire, England
- Ordered: 20 December 1939
- Builder: Swan Hunter, Wallsend
- Laid down: 7 June 1940
- Launched: 12 March 1941
- Renamed: Exmoor June 1941
- Namesake: A fox hunt in Somerset, England
- Completed: 18 October 1941
- Commissioned: 18 October 1941
- Decommissioned: November 1945
- Identification: Pennant number: L08
- Honours and awards: Battle honours for: North Sea 1941 (carried forward from previous HMS Exmoor (L61)); Atlantic 1941-1942; Libya 1942; Sicily 1943; Salerno 1943; Aegean 1943; Mediterranean 1944
- Fate: Sold to Denmark 1954
- Badge: On a red field, two foxes brushes in saltire between two mullets, all gold

Denmark
- Name: HDMS Valdemar Sejr
- Namesake: Valdemar II (1170-1241), King of Denmark (1202-1241)
- Acquired: 1954
- Identification: F343
- Fate: Sold for scrapping 1966

General characteristics Type II
- Class & type: Hunt-class destroyer
- Displacement: 1,050 long tons (1,070 t) standard; 1,430 long tons (1,450 t) full load
- Length: 85.3 m (279 ft 10 in) o/a
- Beam: 9.6 m (31 ft 6 in)
- Draught: 2.51 m (8 ft 3 in)
- Propulsion: 2 Admiralty 3-drum boilers; 2 shaft Parsons geared turbines, 19,000 shp (14,000 kW)
- Speed: 27 knots (50 km/h; 31 mph); 25.5 knots (47.2 km/h; 29.3 mph) full
- Range: 3,600 nmi (6,700 km) at 14 kn (26 km/h)
- Complement: 164
- Armament: 6 × QF 4 in Mark XVI guns on twin mounts Mk. XIX; 4 × QF 2 pdr Mk. VIII on quad mount MK.VII; 2 × 20 mm Oerlikons on single mounts P Mk. III; 110 depth charges, 2 throwers, 3 racks

The second HMS Exmoor (L08), ex-HMS Burton, was a Hunt-class destroyer of the Royal Navy in commission from 1941 to 1945. She was a member of the second subgroup of the class, and saw service during much of World War II. She later served in the Royal Danish Navy as HDMS Valdemar Sejr (F 343).

== Construction and commissioning ==
The ship was ordered under the 1939 War Emergency Build Programme from Swan Hunter, Wallsend, on 20 December 1939. She was laid down as Job Number J4190 as Burton on 7 June 1940 and launched on 12 March 1941. While she was fitting out, she was renamed Exmoor in June 1941 after the loss that year of the previous Exmoor. She was completed on 18 October 1941 and immediately commissioned.

== Service history ==
=== Atlantic, 1941 ===
Upon commissioning, Exmoor immediately began acceptance trials. Upon their successful completion later in October, she steamed to Scapa Flow in the Orkney Islands, where she performed work-ups with ships of the Home Fleet. After completing work-ups in November 1941, she was selected for patrol and convoy escort duties at Gibraltar, but before taking up those responsibilities she steamed to Derry – also known as Londonderry – in Northern Ireland and on 13 November 1941 joined her sister ship Badsworth and the destroyers Vanquisher and Witch as escort of the military convoy WS12Z while it transited the Western Approaches. She was detached from the convoy on 17 November 1941.

In December 1941 Exmoor steamed to Gibraltar, where she reported to the 13th Destroyer Flotilla – which also included her sister ships Blankney and Croome – for duty. On 14 December 1941 she deployed to reinforce the escort of Convoy HG76, which was under heavy attack by German submarines in the North Atlantic Ocean. On 17 December 1941, she joined Blankney, the destroyer Stanley, the corvette Pentstemon, the sloop Stork, and a Grumman Martlet aircraft from the Fleet Air Arm's 802 Naval Air Squadron aboard the escort aircraft carrier Audacity in a depth-charge attack which forced the German submarine U-131 to the surface, where she was sunk by gunfire northeast of Madeira, Portugal, at position 34°12′00″N 013°35′00″W. On 18 December 1941, Exmoor was detached from the convoy and returned to Gibraltar.

=== Mediterranean, 1942 ===
In January 1942 Exmoor transferred to the 37th Destroyer Division, with responsibility for antisubmarine patrols and convoy defence in the North Atlantic Ocean and western Mediterranean Sea. She continued this work until 27 February 1942, when she, Blankney, and Croome were assigned to Force H to take part along with the battleships Malaya, the aircraft carriers Argus and Eagle, the light cruiser Hermione, and the destroyers Active, Anthony, Laforey, Lightning, Whitehall, and Wishart in Operation Spotter I, an attempt to deliver Bristol Blenheim and Supermarine Spitfire aircraft to Malta. The operation was called off on 28 February 1942 when defects were discovered in the fuel tanks of the aircraft.

Exmoor returned to her normal patrol and escort activities until 6 March 1942, when she again was assigned to Force H as an escort for a second attempt to carry Operation Spotter I through to a successful conclusion. She returned to her routine duties on 8 March 1942. On 20 March 1942 she received her third assignment to Force H, this time to join Malaya, Argus, Eagle, Hermione, Active, Anthony, Blankney, Croome, Laforey, Whitehall, Wishart, and the destroyer Duncan in Operation Picket I, the delivery of Blenheim, Spitfire, and Bristol Beaufort aircraft to Malta. She was released to her routine duties on 23 March 1942, but on 28 March 1942 she was assigned to Force H for Operation Picket II, another aircraft delivery to Malta involving the same ships as Picket I. She again resumed her normal patrol escort duties on 30 March 1942. In March 1942, she was "adopted" by the community of Minehead, Somerset, as the result of a successful Warship Week national savings campaign.

On 1 April 1942, Exmoor and Croome were reassigned to the 9th Destroyer Flotilla in the Mediterranean Fleet, based in Alexandria, Egypt, and they departed Gibraltar bound for Alexandria via a cruise around Africa. On 8 April 1942, they arrived at Freetown in Sierra Leone, where they temporarily were assigned to local escort duty. On 11 April 1942, Exmoor and Croome joined the destroyer Wild Swan, the corvette Hydrangea, and the Free French Naval Forces corvettes Commandant Drogou and Commandant Détroyat as local escort for the military Convoy WS 17B as it passed along the coast of West Africa bound for the Cape of Good Hope. Exmoor, Croome, and Commandant Détroyat were detached from the convoy on 15 April 1942 and returned to Freetown.

On 25 April 1942, Exmoor and Croome departed Freetown for the voyage down the west coast of Africa, around the Cape of Good Hope, into the Indian Ocean and up the east coast of Africa, through the Red Sea, and then via the Suez Canal to the eastern Mediterranean and their new duties at Alexandria, where they arrived in May 1942. They began patrol and escort duties in the eastern Mediterranean and support to the British Army garrison at Tobruk in Libya. Support to the garrison lasted into June 1942, when Exmoor was assigned to take part in Operation Vigorous, a major effort to resupply Malta, as part of the escort of the Malta-bound Convoy MW 11. On 13 June 1942, she and Croome joined the British destroyers Fortune, Griffin, Hasty, Hero, Hotspur, Inconstant, Javelin, Jervis, Kelvin, Pakenham, Paladin, Sikh, and Zulu, the British escort destroyers Airedale, Aldenham, Beaufort, Dulverton, Eridge, Hurworth, and Tetcott, and the Royal Australian Navy destroyers HMAS Napier, HMAS Nestor, and HMAS Norman as the escort for MW 11. Axis aircraft began attacks on the convoy on 14 June 1942; the air attacks ceased at nightfall, after which aircraft dropped flares to assist Axis motor torpedo boats in their attacks. Air and torpedo boat attacks continued into 15 June 1942, at which point the threat of interception of the convoy by heavy surface units of the Italian Royal Navy prompted cancellation of the operation and the return of the convoy to port.

On 22 June 1942, Exmoor resumed her normal duties with her destroyer division. In July and August 1942, these focused largely on support to the garrison at Tobruk, including the bombardment of Axis positions ashore in Libya in support of British Army operations. In September 1942, she was chosen to participate in Operation Agreement, a ground and amphibious attack on Axis positions around Tobruk and, after embarking a force of Royal Marines, stood out of Alexandria with Sikh and Zulu on 12 September 1942. She exchanged fire with Axis coastal artillery on 13 September 1942 and, after Agreement ended in complete failure, returned to Alexandria in company with Beaufort, Dulverton, and Hurworth on 14 September 1942.

In October 1942, Exmoor supported military operations ashore in Operation Lightfoot, part of the prelude to the decisive Second Battle of El Alamein, and on 20 October 1942 escorted a force which made a diversionary landing at Ras-el-Kanais. In November 1942 she returned to patrol and convoy escort duty in the eastern Mediterranean. On 17 November 1942 she, Aldenham, Beaufort, the escort destroyer Belvoir, and the Greek destroyer Pindos joined Convoy MW 13 as its close escort in Operation Stone Age, the first attempt to run a westbound convoy to Malta since Operation Vigorous. Despite Axis air attacks on 18 November 1942 that disabled the light cruiser Aurora, the convoy pushed through to Malta, arriving on 20 November 1942. Exmoor and the other ships of the close escort departed Malta on 21 November 1942 and steamed back to Alexandria.

On 1 December 1942, Exmoor, Belvoir, Croome, Hursley, Tetcott, and Pindos joined the Malta-bound Convoy MW 14 as its close escort in Operation Portcullis, delivering the convoy safely to its destination on 5 December 1942. On 7 December 1942, Exmoor, Aldenham, Belvoir, Croome, Dulverton, Hursley, Pakenham, Pindos, and Tetcott joined the light cruiser Orion, the destroyer Petard, and the Greek destroyer Vasilissa Olga in escorting the eastbound Convoy ME 11 from Malta bound for Egypt, but Exmoor, Orion, Aldenham, Croome, Dulverton, and Hursley detached on 9 December 1942 to escort the westbound Convoy MW 15 to Malta in Operation Quadrangle A.

=== Mediterranean, 1943 ===
From January to March 1943, Exmoor and the rest of her destroyer division supported operations by the British Eighth Army as it advanced across Libya and into Tunisia in pursuit of retreating Axis forces. On 27 March 1943, she rescued 13 survivors of the British merchant ship City of Guildford, which the German submarine U-593 had sunk off Derna, Libya, at position 33°00′00″N 022°50′00″E. In April 1943 her division was transferred to Malta, from which she continued her support of the Eighth Army and engaged in convoy escort. From 7 to 13 May 1943, her division joined the destroyers Jervis, Paladin, Petard, and Nubian of Malta-based Force K and the Bône, Algeria-based British destroyers Laforey, Loyal, and Tartar and Polish Navy destroyer ORP Błyskawica of Force Q in blockading Cape Bon, Tunisia, in Operation Retribution, to prevent Axis forces in Tunisia from evacuating to Sicily by sea.

In June 1943, the Royal Navy selected Exmoor for participation in Operation Husky, the Allied invasion of Sicily planned for July 1943, and in July was assigned to Escort Force P for the amphibious landings. She steamed to Port Said, Egypt, from which she departed on 5 July 1943, escorting the assault Convoy MWF 36. After she left the convoy on 8 July 1943 to refuel, but rejoined the escort on 9 July 1943 and delivered the convoy to the BARK WEST invasion beach on 10 July 1943, the first day of the landings. She then defended the beachhead from Axis aircraft, surface ships, and submarines. Exmoor, the British destroyer Eskimo, and the Greek destroyer Kanaris attempted to enter the harbour at Augusta, Sicily, on 11 July 1943 and exchanged fire with Axis coastal artillery.

Exmoor returned to patrol and escort duty in the central Mediterranean in August 1943, but later than month was selected to participate in Operation Avalanche, the Allied landings at Salerno on the mainland of Italy planned for September 1943. She was assigned to Task Force 65 along with Laforey, Loyal, Nubian, Tartar, and Lookout of the 19th Destroyer Flotilla and the escort destroyers Beaufort, Belvoir, Blackmore, Brecon, Brocklesby, Dulverton, Mendip, Ledbury, Pindos, Quantock, and Tetcott. Steaming to Tripoli, Libya, in September 1943, the task force departed Tripoli on 6 September 1943 as the escort for Convoy TSF 1, which it delivered to the landing beaches on 10 September 1943. Exmoor then provided antiaircraft defense of and gunfire support to the beachhead and defense of Allied ships off it from German motor torpedo boats until 16 September 1943.

In October 1943, Exmoor was assigned to operations in the Aegean Sea to assist in the unsuccessful Allied attempt to defend Italian-held islands there against invasion by German forces during the Dodecanese Campaign. On 24 October 1943 the light cruiser Aurora, the destroyer Pathfinder, Exmoor, and her sister ship Blencathra, sortied from Alexandria to relieve the light cruiser HMS Phoebe and the escort destroyers Aldenham and Hursley there, after which Exmoor engaged in operations to intercept craft carrying German troops to the islands and to supply British garrisons. On 8 and 9 November 1943, she conducted an unsuccessful search for German invasion craft reportedly bound for Levitha, then sheltered in the Gulf of Doris. She loaded 10 long tons (11.2 short tons, 10.2 metric tons) of ammunition at Limassol on 13 November 1943 and departed the next day with the British destroyer Fury and the Polish destroyer ORP Krakowiak to deliver it to Leros, but aborted her voyage when the surrender of Leros to German forces became inevitable. On 24 November 1943 she took part in Operation Rumble Bumble, a diversionary action. On 4 December 1943 she and Aldenham relieved the destroyers Penn and Petard of the escort of the damaged Greek destroyer Adrias to Alexandria, where she arrived on 6 December 1943.

After the Dodecanese Campaign ended in an Allied defeat, Exmoor was transferred to the 22nd Destroyer Flotilla at Algiers, Algeria, for patrol and escort duty in the central Mediterranean. She departed for Algiers in December 1943, arriving there on 31 December 1943.

=== Mediterranean, 1944 ===
In February 1944, Exmoor was assigned to the protection of shipping supporting Operation Shingle, the Allied invasion at Anzio and Nettuno, Italy. She escorted convoys to the beachhead and provided antiaircraft defense there. On 10 March 1944 she joined her sister ships Blankney, Blencathra, and Brecon, the destroyer Urchin, and the United States Navy destroyer USS Madison in a depth-charge attack in the western Mediterranean south of Ostia, Italy, that forced the German submarine U-450 to the surface. U-450 scuttled herself at position 41°11′00″N 012°27′00″E, and Urchin rescued her entire crew.

Exmoor returned to her routine duties in the central Mediterranean in April 1944. In October 1944 she deployed to escort convoys to the mainland of Greece in support of Operation Manna, and became the flotilla leader of the 3rd Destroyer Flotilla, which consisted of Hunt-class escort destroyers including Liddesdale. She escorted convoys and supported ground operations in the eastern Mediterranean into early 1945.

=== Mediterranean, 1945 ===
In early 1945, Exmoor supported the Allied reoccupation of the Aegean islands and patrolled to intercept craft evacuating German forces from them. She, Ledbury, and Tetcott also deployed to Nisero in the Dodecanese to support a Greek Army unit in an attack on a German raiding force there. After that, she continued Aegean operations until April 1945, shen she steamed to Taranto, Italy, for a refit.

Under refit when Germany surrendered in early May 1945, Exmoor was selected for service in the Eastern Fleet. She rejoined her flotilla in the Mediterranean in May 1945, but on 1 June 1945 departed for the United Kingdom, where she began another refit in the commercial shipyard at Royal Albert Dock in London to prepare for service in Southeast Asia. Upon the armistice with Japan that ended World War II on 15 August 1945, however, her refit and deployment to the Eastern Fleet were cancelled.

== Decommissioning and reserve ==
Exmoor was decommissioned in November 1945 and placed in reserve at Portsmouth. She remained there until placed on the sale list in 1953.

== Royal Danish Navy ==
The ship was sold to Denmark and entered service in the Royal Danish Navy as HDMS Valdemar Sejr (F 343) in 1954. She was placed on the disposal list in 1962 and was sold in 1966 for scrapping in Denmark.

== Publications ==
- Colledge, J. J.; Warlow, Ben (2006) [1969]. Ships of the Royal Navy: The Complete Record of All Fighting Ships of the Royal Navy from the 15th Century to the Present (3rd Rev ed.). London: Chatham Publishing. ISBN 978-1-86176-281-8. OCLC 67375475.
- Naval History: HMS EXMOOR (ii) (L 08) - Type II, Hunt-class Escort Destroyer
- uboat.net HMS Exmoor (ii) (L 08)
