= Operation Portcullis =

Convoy to Malta in WWII

- Part of the Battle of the Mediterranean of the Second World War
- Relief map of the Mediterranean Sea
Date	1–5 December 1942
Location	Mediterranean Sea, Malta 35°53′42″N 14°31′14″E
Result	British victory

Belligerents
United Kingdom	Kingdom of Italy; Luftwaffe; Kriegsmarine

Operation Portcullis (1–5 December 1942) was the voyage of the Allied Convoy MW 14 with supplies to Malta from Port Said in Egypt during the Second World War. The convoy followed the success of Operation Stoneage (16–20 November) which had raised the Siege of Malta. Four merchant ships were escorted to Malta by seven destroyers of the 12th Destroyer Flotilla, supported by three cruisers of the 15th Cruiser Squadron and three destroyers from Alexandria.

The convoy was met by Force K from Malta with two cruisers and four destroyers. Convoy MW 14 was not attacked by Axis forces en route or while unloading which was complete by 9 December. Lack of opposition led to the sailing of pairs of ships to Malta with ordinary western desert convoys as far as Benghazi. The ships rendezvoused with escorts from Malta and Force K guarded against a sortie by Italian ships from Taranto.

== Background ==
=== Malta ===
In the autumn of 1942, the British regained control of the central Mediterranean, through the combined effects of the survival of Malta, brought about by the success of Operation Pedestal (3–15 August 1942) and Operation Stoneage (16–20 November), the Second Battle of Alamein (23 October – 11 November) in Egypt and Operation Torch (8–16 November) the Allied invasion of French North Africa. Offensive operations from Malta had been resumed with the supplies delivered by Pedestal and intensified with those of Stoneage. Axis shipping losses contributed to the chronic fuel shortage that constrained Panzerarmee Afrika and limited it to delaying actions back to the Tunisian border. With the revival of Malta as an offensive base after the arrival of the Stoneage convoy, the short journey by Axis ships from Italy to Tunis and Tripoli became much more hazardous. Allied submarines sank 14 Italian ships in October and in November the air anti-shipping offensive had similar success, sinking 21 ships.

The fast Abdiel-class minelayer HMS Manxman sailed from Alexandria on 10 November and arrived on 12 November with powdered milk, cereals and meat, leaving for Gibraltar that day, to collect mines and lay them off Cape Bon. HMS Welshman detached from a convoy bringing supplies to North Africa for Operation Torch and arrived on 18 November. Force K was re-established at Malta on 27 November with the cruisers HMS Cleopatra, Dido and Euryalus of the 15th Cruiser Squadron and four ships of the 14th Destroyer Flotilla, taken from the Stoneage convoy escorts. Force Q, the 12th Cruiser Squadron with HMS Aurora, Penelope, Dido and Sirius with four destroyers moved to Bône (now Annaba) on 30 November.

=== North Africa ===
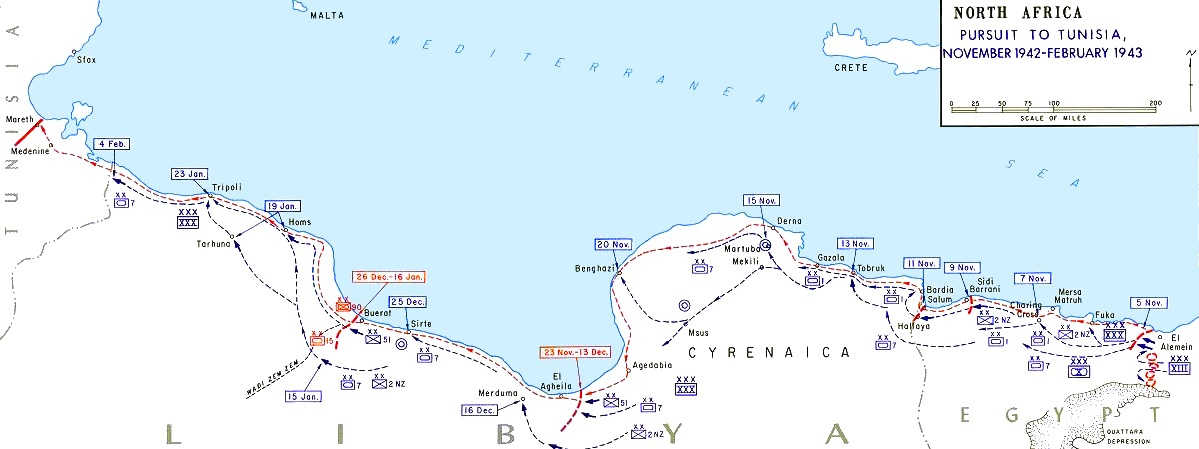
Advance of the Eighth Army, November 1942 – February 1943

As the Panzerarmee retreated, the Axis air forces had to leapfrog backwards from airfield to airfield. The Desert Air Force swiftly took over abandoned airfields and the landing grounds at Gazala were open by 17 November; Martuba, near Derna, was operational on 19 November and the Navy began scheduled convoys to Benghazi on 26 November. Ultra intercepts of Axis Enigma machine cyphers revealed that on 24 November, the Panzerarmee had only a few days' fuel left and on 3 December, that Italian troops were withdrawing to Buerat. By the middle of November the Panzerarmee retreat from Alamein had reached El Agheila. The front was 110 mi (180 km) wide and had to be held with a force that was a shadow of the Axis force that had been in Egypt that October. The front settled while the British built up their supplies for an attack and the Axis forces tried to get supplies to the Panzerarmee across the Mediterranean.

== Prelude ==
=== Axis command ===
The Axis command structure in the Mediterranean was centralised at the top and fragmented below. Benito Mussolini had monopolised authority over the Italian armed forces since 1933 by taking the offices of Minister of War, Minister of the Navy and Minister of the Air Force. Feldmarschall Albert Kesselring of the Luftwaffe commanded German ground forces in the theatre as Commander-in-Chief South (Oberbefehlshaber Süd, OB Süd) but had no authority over Axis operations in North Africa or the organisation of convoys to Libya. Fliegerkorps II and Fliegerkorps X came under the usual Luftwaffe chain of command. Since November 1941, Kesselring had exercised some influence over the conduct of the German naval operations in the Mediterranean as the nominal head of Naval Command Italy (Marinekommando Italien) but this was subordinate to the Kriegsmarine chain of command. German service rivalries obstructed co-operation and there was little unity of effort between German and the Italian forces in the Mediterranean. Kesselring had the authority only to co-ordinate plans for combined operations by German and Italian forces and some influence on the use of the Regia Aeronautica for the protection of convoys to North Africa. The Italian Navy resisted all German attempts to integrate its operations; ships in different squadrons never trained together and Supermarina (Italian Naval High Command) constantly over-ruled subordinate commanders.

=== Convoy plan ===
Location map of Malta

Convoy MW 14 consisted of the Agwimonte (6,679 gross register tons [GRT]), Alcoa Prospector (6,797 GRT), Suffolk (13,890 GRT) and Glenartney (9,795 GRT) which had a naval crew. (Note: Glenartney had been loaded at Port Tewfik at the south end of the Suez canal, then sailed southwards into the Red Sea to mislead Axis spies. At Port Sudan the cargo was emptied and reloaded, the cased petrol being put into stronger containers. The crew went on strike over being kept in the dark about the destination and the captain took on a party of twelve troops, making sure that the deck machine guns had been disabled. At Suez, the ships' company was forced off the ship and imprisoned for the duration of Portcullis. The last portion of the cargo was taken on board at Ismailia and the ship joined the rest of the convoy at Port Said, the Navy crew under Merchant Navy orders.) A continuous escort was provided by seven Hunt-class destroyers of the 12th Destroyer Flotilla, comprising HMS Aldenham, Belvoir, Croome, Exmoor, Hursley, Tetcott and the Greek Pindos after the tanker Yoruba Linda joined from Benghazi with its two escorts. The next day, the 6-inch cruiser [6 in (150 mm)] HMS Orion with the destroyers Pakenham, Petard and Vasilissa Olga were to join from Alexandria. When south-west of Crete, the convoy was to be met by the 5.25-inch cruisers [5.25 in (133 mm)] Dido and Euryalus, with the fleet destroyers HMS Jervis, Javelin, Kelvin, Nubian of Force K (Rear-Admiral Arthur Power) from Malta.

== Convoy MW 14 ==
During the evening of 1 December, Convoy MW 14 departed Port Said and on 2 December, rendezvoused with the tanker Yorba Linda and two Hunt-class destroyers. Next day, the cruiser Orion and three destroyers arrived from Alexandria and on 4 December, when south-west of Crete, the convoy was joined by Force K, comprising two cruisers and four destroyers from Malta. The convoy steamed for Malta at 16 kn (18 mph; 30 km/h), receiving only a few ineffectual attacks from Axis torpedo-bombers. The convoy reached Grand Harbour early on 5 December and received the customary welcome from the populace and garrison. As the swift unloading of the ships began, congestion in the harbour was relieved by Operation MH 2, the dispatch of Convoy ME 11 on 7 December, containing Yoruba Linda from Convoy MW 14 and eight ships from Pedestal and Stoneage. By 9 December the ships were unloaded.

== Aftermath ==
=== Analysis ===
Stoneage and Portcullis delivered 56,000 long tons (57,000 t) of cargo, not including fuel oils; once the Portcullis ships had unloaded, enough flour was on the island to last until May 1943, food and fodder were sufficient until March and cooking fuels until April, even after some small ration increases. The success of Portcullis led to the institution of the Quadrangle operations, regular voyages by pairs of ships accompanying ordinary west-bound convoys supplying the Eighth Army advancing from El Agheila to Tunisia. The ships would be met off Benghazi by escorts from Malta and sail northwards, protected by the 15th Cruiser Squadron from a possible sortie by the Italian fleet at Taranto.

== Allied order of battle ==
=== Allied merchant ships ===
Convoy MW 14
Ship	Year	Flag	GRT	Notes
SS Agwimonte	1941	United States	6,679	Departed Port Said 1 December
SS Alcoa Prospector	1941	United States	6,797	Departed Port Said 1 December
MV Glenartney	1939	Merchant Navy	9,795	Departed Port Said 1 December
MV Suffolk	1939	Merchant Navy	11,145	Departed Port Said 1 December
SS Yorba Linda	1921	Panama	6,900	Tanker, joined 2 December from Benghazi

=== Cruiser cover ===
Cruiser cover
Ship	Flag	Type	Notes
HMS Orion	Royal Navy	Arethusa-class cruiser	
HMS Pakenham	Royal Navy	P-class destroyer	14th Destroyer Flotilla
HMS Petard	Royal Navy	P-class destroyer	14th Destroyer Flotilla
Vasilissa Olga	Hellenic Navy	Modified G-class destroyer	14th Destroyer Flotilla

=== Force K (Malta) ===
Force K
Ship	Flag	Type	Notes
HMS Cleopatra	Royal Navy	Dido-class cruiser	From 4 December, flagship, Rear-Admiral Arthur Power
HMS Dido	Royal Navy	Dido-class cruiser	From 4 December
HMS Euryalus	Royal Navy	Dido-class cruiser	From 4 December
HMS Nubian	Royal Navy	Tribal-class destroyer	From 4 December
HMS Jervis	Royal Navy	J-class destroyer	From 4 December
HMS Javelin	Royal Navy	J-class destroyer	From 4 December
HMS Kelvin	Royal Navy	K-class destroyer	From 4 December

=== Close escort ===
Close escort
Ship	Flag	Type	Notes
HMS Aldenham	Royal Navy	Hunt-class destroyer	12th Destroyer Flotilla
HMS Belvoir	Royal Navy	Hunt-class destroyer	12th Destroyer Flotilla
HMS Croome	Royal Navy	Hunt-class destroyer	12th Destroyer Flotilla
HMS Exmoor	Royal Navy	Hunt-class destroyer	12th Destroyer Flotilla
HMS Hursley	Royal Navy	Hunt-class destroyer	12th Destroyer Flotilla
HMS Tetcott	Royal Navy	Hunt-class destroyer	12th Destroyer Flotilla
Pindos	Hellenic Navy	Hunt-class destroyer	12th Destroyer Flotilla

== See also ==
- Battle of the Mediterranean
