= HMS Hurworth (L28) =

Destroyer of the Royal Navy

Coordinates: 36°59′N 27°06′E

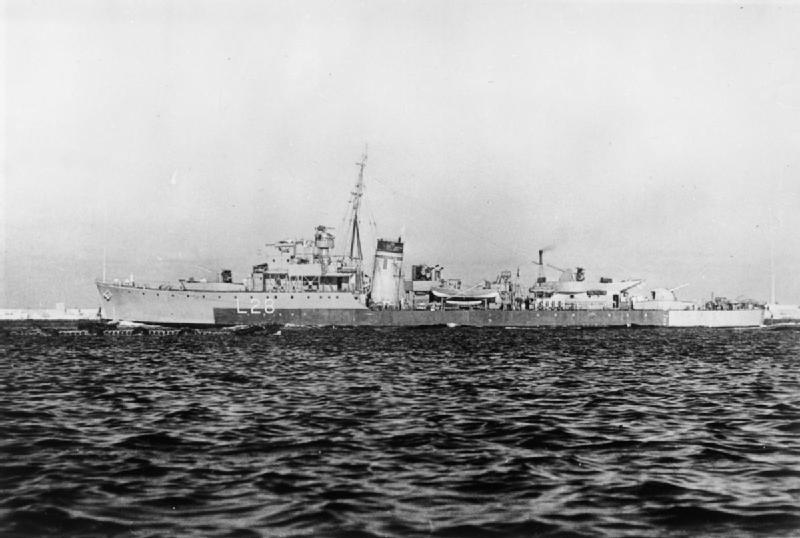
- Hurworth L 28

History

United Kingdom
- Name: HMS Hurworth
- Ordered: 20 December 1939
- Builder: Vickers-Armstrongs, High Walker
- Laid down: 10 April 1940
- Launched: 16 April 1941
- Commissioned: 5 October 1941
- Identification: Pennant number: L28
- Honours and awards: Atlantic 1941; Libya 1942 - Sirte 1942; Mediterranean 1942; Malta Convoys 1942; Sicily 1943 - Aegean 1943
- Fate: Sunk by a mine, 22 October 1943

General characteristics
- Class & type: Hunt-class destroyer
- Displacement: 1,050 long tons (1,070 t) standard; 1,430 long tons (1,450 t) full load
- Length: o/a 85.3 m (279 ft 10 in)
- Beam: 9.6 m (31 ft 6 in)
- Draught: 2.51 m (8 ft 3 in)
- Propulsion: Two Admiralty 3-drum boilers; 2 shaft Parsons geared turbines, 19,000 shp
- Speed: 27 knots (31 mph; 50 km/h); 25.5 kn (29.3 mph; 47.2 km/h) full
- Range: 2,560 nmi (4,740 km) at 20 kn (37 km/h)
- Complement: 168
- Armament: 6 × QF 4 in Mark XVI on twin mounts Mk. XIX; 4 × QF 2 pdr Mk. VIII on quad mount MK.VII; 2 × 20 mm Oerlikons on single mounts P Mk. III; 110 depth charges, two throwers, three racks

HMS Hurworth was a Second World War Type II Hunt-class escort destroyer of the British Royal Navy. She spent most of her career in the Mediterranean. She was lost to a mine in the Aegean Sea in 1943.

== Construction ==
Hurworth was ordered with 15 others of the same type on 20 December 1939 as part of the War Emergency Programme. The ship was laid down by Vickers-Armstrongs on the River Tyne at High Walker on 10 April 1940 in a yard big enough for two ships to be built at the same time. Her 'partner' was Middleton. Hurworth, as Admiralty Job No. J4207, was launched on 16 April 1941, and commissioned on 5 November. Hurworth's complement was found in Portsmouth; her skipper and 'Jimmy' (first lieutenant), were both experienced officers. The 'workup' period was intense, with both ship and crew being tested to the limit. She eventually left the Tyne for Scapa Flow, calling at Rosyth where she was commissioned; she arrived at the 'Flow' on the 8th.

== Service history ==
=== From Scotland to Suez ===
Hurworth's first operation involved taking Crown Prince Olaf of Norway from Scapa Flow to Scrabster in northern mainland Scotland. She then escorted the troopship Rangitata, with her fellow destroyer Exmoor to Gibraltar, from the Clyde; arriving at the 'Rock' on 1 December 1941. Rangitata was shepherded to Freetown by Hurworth and two more destroyers, Vidette and Highlander. They were joined by another destroyer, Brilliant on 18 December and arrived in the West African port in time for Christmas.

Having carried out more escort work between Freetown and Cape Town in South Africa, Hurworth then sailed independently to Suez, becoming part of the 5th Destroyer Flotilla in Alexandria on 6 February 1942.

=== The Mediterranean ===
==== Convoy escort and invasion support ====
Hurworth was kept busy throughout the year escorting merchant ships to Tobruk and Malta against stiff Axis aerial opposition. She also provided fire support at Mersa Matruh in August 1942. She then escorted the merchantmen - the 'empties', once they had discharged their cargoes, on the return journey to Alexandria. She was also involved with other Royal Navy ships and aircraft of the Royal Air Force in the action against a Kriegsmarine U-Boat, U-559, on 30 October.

In November, Hurworth, along with nine other ships, sailed as part of Operation Stoneage, escorting Convoy MW 13 to Malta. Somewhat surprisingly, the ships arrived at the beleaguered island without loss on 19 November. The return voyage to Alexandria saw several air attacks which were unsuccessful. Hurworth took part in other convoy escort operations in December, mostly to Malta; although one, MW 16, was to the newly recaptured port of Benghazi.

The vagaries of war were driven home in the New Year rather dramatically with the death in February of Lieutenant Amos Stuart DSC in a car accident.

In May 1943 Hurworth was involved in Operation Retribution, the prevention of enemy troops escaping from Tunisia and Algeria to Sicily and Italy. The plan seemed to have worked; Axis forces surrendered in North Africa on 13 May; many prisoners were taken.

By now a member of the 22nd Destroyer Flotilla, Hurworth was due to support Operation Husky, the Allied invasion of Sicily, but boiler problems caused her to put into Malta for repairs. When she did arrive in the invasion area, she provided fire support and patrols off the British ACID beach.

=== The tide turns ===
The Italian capitulation did not mean the tempo slackened off. One crew member was quoted as writing to his mother about "having 4 hours off the ship in as many weeks".

The convoy escort jobs continued; Hurworth was not involved in the Salerno landings, but she was present at Malta when the Italian fleet, including two battleships, two cruisers and a destroyer arrived, following their surrender.

=== The Aegean ===
The ship returned to escort duties until 15 September, when she, along with Croome, crammed 300 infantrymen aboard for passage from Haifa to Portolago, on Leros in an attempt at thwarting German efforts to garrison the Greek islands following their evacuation by the Italians.

More tragedy came along; following a gunfire support operation against Kos on 19 October 1943, Hurworth was hit by return fire. One man was killed.

=== Loss ===
Hurworth left Alexandria on 21 October 1943 as part of the supply force in the Dodecanese islands. The following day, with the ships just off the neutral Turkish coast prior to the 'dash' to Leros, the Greek destroyer Adrias struck a mine and was badly damaged. Hurworth, on going to investigate, suffered the same fate, but the explosion split the ship in two. Both halves sank within 15 minutes. 133 men died, there were 85 survivors.

=== Aftermath ===
Hurworth lies in 102 metres (335 ft) of water at 36.59N 27.06E in Greek territorial waters; she is a War Grave. A memorial plaque was set up in October 1945 in Salamis, the Greek naval base.

== Bibliography ==
- English, John (1987). The Hunts: A History of the Design, Development and Careers of the 86 Destroyers of This Class Built for the Royal and Allied Navies During World War II. Cumbria, UK: World Ship Society. ISBN 0-905617-44-4.
