= HMS Arethusa (26) =

1934 Arethusa-class cruiser

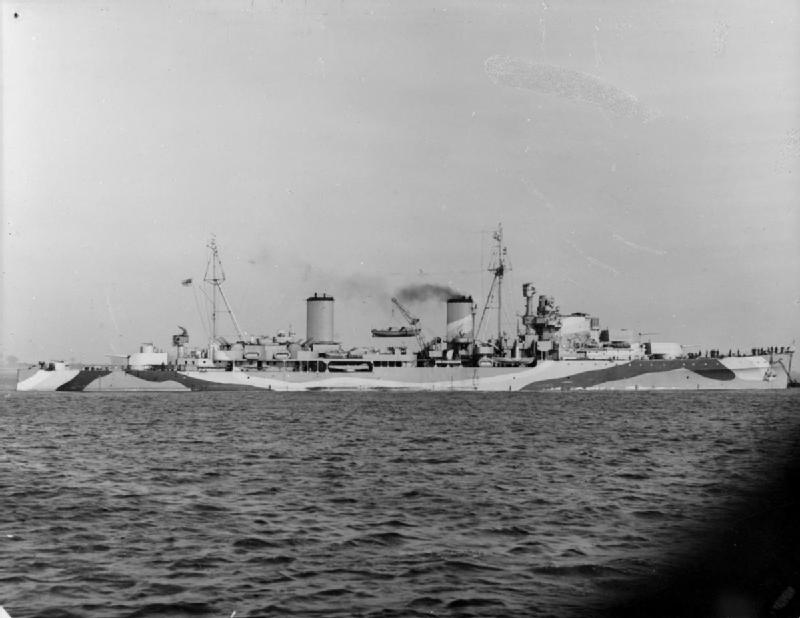
- HMS Arethusa in April 1942

History

United Kingdom
- Name: HMS Arethusa
- Namesake: Arethusa
- Ordered: 1 September 1932
- Builder: Chatham Dockyard
- Cost: £1,280.463
- Laid down: 25 January 1933
- Launched: 6 March 1934
- Commissioned: 23 May 1935
- Decommissioned: 1945
- Refit: Sep - Oct 1937; Oct 1940 – Jan 1941
- Identification: Pennant number: 26
- Motto: Celeriter Audax (Latin:"Swiftly and audacious")
- Honours and awards: Ushant 1778 & 1781 - St Lucia 1796 - Curaçao 1807 - Black Sea 1854 - China 1900 - Heligoland 1914 - Dogger Bank 1915 - Norway 1940-41 - Malta Convoys 1941-42 - Normandy 1944
- Fate: Scrapped at Cashmores, Newport 1950

General characteristics
- Class & type: Arethusa-class light cruiser
- Displacement: 5,220 tons standard; 6,665 tons full load
- Length: 506 ft (154 m)
- Beam: 51 ft (16 m)
- Draught: 16.5 ft (5.0 m)
- Propulsion: Four Parsons geared steam turbines; Four Admiralty 3-drum oil-fired boilers; Four shafts; 64,000 shp
- Speed: 32 knots (59 km/h)
- Range: 5,300 nmi (9,800 km) at 13 knots (24 km/h)
- Complement: 500
- Sensors & processing systems: Type 286 radar (1941), replaced in 1942 by Type 273, Type 281, Type 282, Type 284, Type 285
- Armament: Original configuration 6 × BL 6 inch Mk XXIII naval guns (3×2) 4 × 4-inch (102 mm) AA guns (4×1) 2 × .50 caliber quadruple machine guns 6 × 21 inch (533 mm) torpedo tubes (2×3) 1941 additions 8 × 2-pounder (40 mm) AA guns (2×4) 2 × UP mountings (removed April 1942) 4 × 20 mm Oerlikon AA guns (4×1) April 1942 configuration 6 × 6-inch (152 mm) guns (3×2) 8 × 4-inch (102 mm) AA guns (4×2) 8 × 2-pounder (40 mm) AA guns (2×4) (increased to 11) 8 × 20 mm Oerlikon AA guns (8×1) 6 × 21-inch (533 mm) torpedo tubes (2×3) April 1944 configuration 6 × 6-inch (152 mm) guns (3×2) 8 × 4-inch (102 mm) AA guns (4×2) 8 × 40 mm Bofors AA guns (2×4) 16 × 20 mm Oerlikon AA guns (8×1; 4×2) 6 × 21-inch (533 mm) torpedo tubes (2×3)
- Armour: Original configuration 1 to 3 inches – magazine protection 2.25 inches – belt 1 inches – deck, turrets and bulkheads
- Aircraft carried: One Hawker Osprey (Fairey Seafox from 1937) (removed 1940)

HMS Arethusa was the name ship of her class of light cruisers built for the Royal Navy. She was built by Chatham Dockyard, with the keel being laid down on 25 January 1933. She was launched on 6 March 1934, and commissioned 21 May 1935 by Captain Philip Vian.

== History ==
Arethusa was assigned to the 3rd Cruiser Squadron in the Mediterranean on completion and was still there at the onset of the Second World War in September 1939. Early in 1940 she and her sister Penelope were recalled to the Home Fleet, where they formed the 2nd Cruiser Squadron with the remainder of the class. She participated in the Norwegian Campaign in April 1940, but on 8 May she joined the Nore Command, where she supported the defending forces in Calais and later aided the evacuations from French Atlantic ports.

On 28 June 1940 she was a component of the new Force H at Gibraltar, with which she participated in the action against Vichy French forces at Mers el Kebir in July 1940. With Force H she took part in convoy protection patrols in the Atlantic and operated in the Mediterranean.

During the sortie of the German battleship Bismarck in May 1941 she was employed in Iceland and Faroese waters, but by July she had returned to the Mediterranean, where she escorted Malta convoys and ran supply trips to the island. Towards the end of 1941 she returned to home waters and took part in the Lofoten raid (Operation Anklet) in December, where she was damaged by near misses. After refit and repair at Chatham until April 1942, she returned to the Mediterranean in June 1942, where she joined the 15th Cruiser Squadron, operating mostly in support of the supply of Malta.

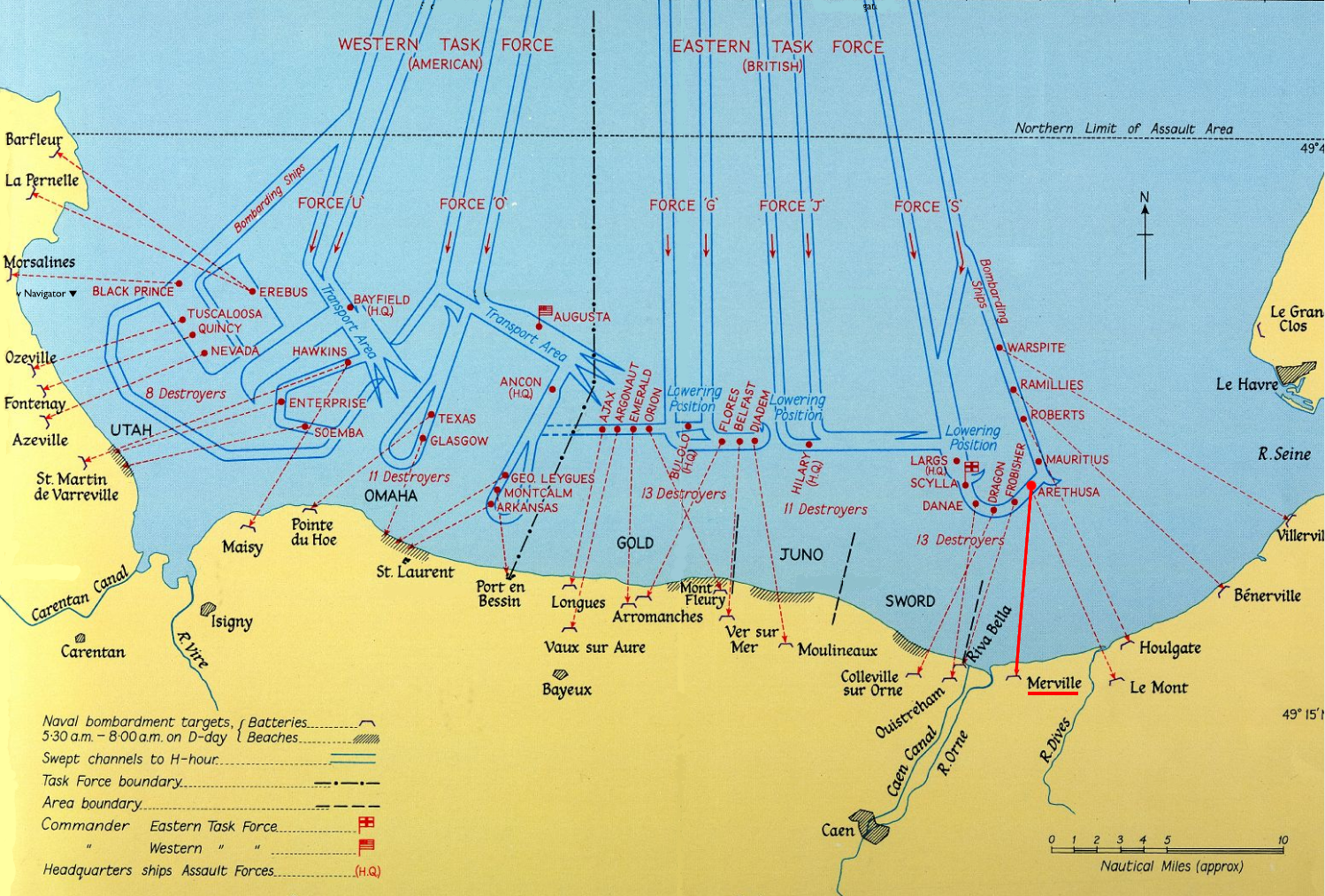
Position of Arethusa during the Invasion of Normandy

While on Operation Stoneage, a torpedo from an Italian aircraft struck Arethusa on 18 November 1942 and caused many casualties. She received temporary repair work in Alexandria that lasted until 7 February 1943, after which she proceeded to Charleston Navy Yard, Charleston, South Carolina, United States, for full repair. These were completed by 15 December 1943 and the ship then returned to Britain. (Note: Arethusa was steaming at 18 kn (33 km/h; 21 mph) when the torpedo hit the port side below B turret, blowing a hole 53 by 35 ft (16 by 11 m) in the side. The ship caught fire from A turret back to the bridge and flooded to the waterline for 100 ft (30 m) back from the bow. The ship listed to port by 15° and fuel oil was transferred to the starboard tanks to compensate; power failed except to the rear of the forward boiler room and the telephones failed. Despite the damage and occasional air attacks, Arethusa was towed backwards to Alexandria by Petard. After shifting the anchor chains astern, the crew managed to get the starboard propeller under water and sail backwards at slow astern, arriving during the evening of 21 November; the ship was under repair for more than a year in the US.)

In 1941 Arethusa had been adopted by the people of Swansea. A memorial relief to the 156 men killed in the November 1942 aircraft attack can still be viewed in the city's Maritime Quarter. Swansea Museum's reserve collection at its Landore facility contains the ship's badge, a 20 mm Oerlikon AA gun salvaged from the Newport scrapyard, and a scale model of the ship.

She did not become fully operational again until early June 1944, when she sailed for the invasion of Normandy, forming part of Force D off Sword Beach. She carried George VI across the channel to Normandy, when he toured the beaches and visited the Allied command headquarters. On 24 June she came under air attack in Seine Bay and sustained some damage. On 25 June a magnetic mine detonated in her wake. The shock damage was fairly extensive, the cruiser went to Portsmouth for repairs then to a commercial yard for yet another refit and did not return to service until September.

By January 1945, she was part of the 15th Cruiser Squadron with the Mediterranean Fleet and stayed there until October 1945 when she returned to Britain and was immediately placed in the reserve (at the Nore). There was a tentative plan to sell her to the Royal Norwegian Navy in 1946 but this came to nothing and she was placed in category 'B' reserve. Because the Navy considered her class of ships too small to be worth modernising, the Navy used Arethusa for trials and experiments in 1949 before allocating her to BISCO for disposal. On 9 May 1950, she arrived at Cashmore's, Newport, for breaking up.
