= HMS Beaufort (L14) =

Destroyer of the Royal Navy

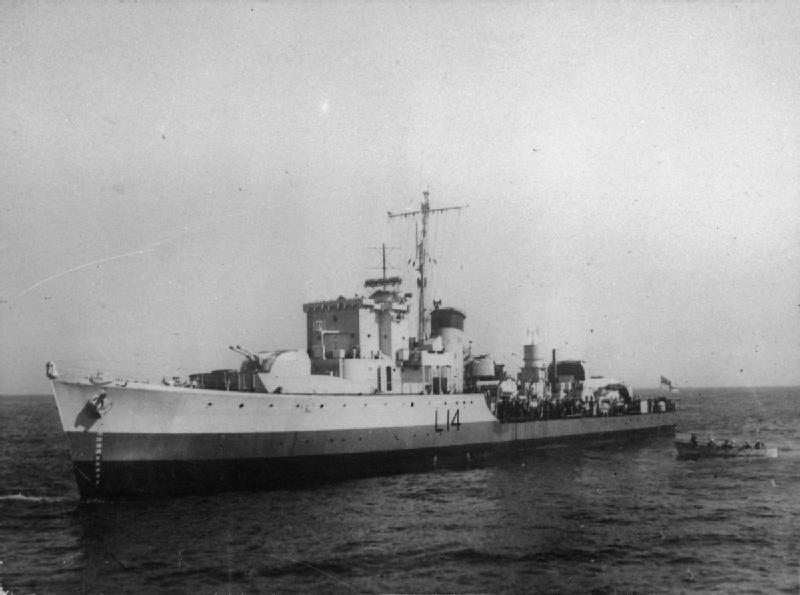
- Beaufort in May 1945

History

United Kingdom
- Name: HMS Beaufort
- Ordered: 4 September 1940
- Builder: Cammell Laird
- Laid down: 17 July 1940
- Launched: 9 June 1941
- Commissioned: 3 November 1941
- Fate: Transferred to the Royal Norwegian Navy in 1952

Norway
- Name: Haugesund
- Identification: F312
- Fate: Sold for breaking up in 1965
- Notes: Pennant number: D312 changed to F312 after 1956

General characteristics
- Class & type: Type II Hunt-class destroyer
- Displacement: 1,050 long tons (1,067 t) standard; 1,490 long tons (1,514 t) full load
- Length: 85.34 m (280.0 ft)
- Beam: 9.62 m (31.6 ft)
- Draught: 2.51 m (8 ft 3 in)
- Propulsion: 2 shaft Parsons geared turbines; 19,000 shp
- Speed: 25.5 kn (47.2 km/h; 29.3 mph)
- Range: 3,600 nmi (6,670 km) at 14 knots (26 km/h)
- Complement: 164
- Armament: 6 × QF 4 in Mark XVI on twin mounts Mk. XIX; AAA - 2 × 4 12.7mm Vickers, 2 × 20 mm; 6 Thornycroft depth charge throwers

HMS Beaufort was a Hunt-class destroyer of the Royal Navy. She was laid down on 17 July 1940 at Cammell Laird, Birkenhead. She was launched on 9 June 1941 and commissioned on 3 November 1941. During the Second World War the ship served in the Mediterranean Sea, escorting convoys and covering landings. She was transferred to the Royal Norwegian Navy in 1952 and scrapped in 1965.

== Construction and design ==
HMS Beaufort was one of 16 Type II Hunt-class destroyers ordered from various shipbuilders on 20 December 1939. The Hunts were meant to fill the Royal Navy's need for a large number of small destroyer-type vessels capable of both convoy escort and operations with the fleet. The Type II Hunts differed from the earlier ships in having increased beam in order to improve stability (Note: A design error caused the first Hunt, Atherstone to be dangerously unstable when built. The first 23 Hunts had a twin 4-inch mount removed, the ships' superstructure cut down and ballast fitted in order to restore adequate stability.) and carry the ships' originally intended armament.

Beaufort was laid down at Cammell-Laird's Birkenhead, shipyard on 17 July 1940 and was launched on 9 June 1941, and was completed on 3 November that year. Beaufort was the second ship of the Royal Navy to have that name, and was named after the Duke of Beaufort's Hunt.

Beaufort was 264 feet 3 inches (80.54 m) long between perpendiculars and 280 feet (85.34 m) overall. The ship's beam was 31 feet 6 inches (9.60 m) and draught 7 feet 9 inches (2.36 m). Displacement was 1,050 long tons (1,070 t) standard and 1,490 long tons (1,510 t) under full load. Two Admiralty boilers raising steam at 300 pounds per square inch (2,100 kPa) and 620 °F (327 °C) fed Parsons single-reduction geared steam turbines that drove two propeller shafts, generating 19,000 shaft horsepower (14,000 kW) at 380 rpm. This gave a speed of 27 knots (50 km/h; 31 mph). Fuel capacity was 277 long tons (281 t) of oil, giving a design range of 2,560 nautical miles (4,740 km; 2,950 mi) (although in service use, this dropped to 1,550 nautical miles (2,870 km; 1,780 mi)).

The ship's main gun armament was six 4 inch (102 mm) QF Mk XVI dual purpose (anti-ship and anti-aircraft) guns in three twin mounts, with one mount forward and two aft. Additional close-in anti-aircraft armament was provided by a quadruple 2-pounder "pom-pom" mount and two single Oerlikon 20 mm cannon mounted in the bridge wings. Power-operated twin 20 mm Oerlikon mounts replaced the single Oerlikons during the war. Up to 110 depth charges could be carried. (Note: While Lenton and Friedman both state a capacity of 110 depth charges, Gardiner and Chesneau give a capacity of 30 or 60 charges.) The ship had a complement of 168 officers and men.

== Second World War service ==
After commissioning and work-up, Beaufort, commanded by Standish O'Grady Roche, was assigned to the 5th Destroyer Flotilla of the Mediterranean Fleet, arriving at the flotilla's base at Alexandria, Egypt in February 1942. On 12 February 1942, Beaufort left Alexandria as part of the escort of eight destroyers and one anti-aircraft cruiser (Note: The cruiser Carlisle, the fleet destroyer Lance and the Hunt-class destroyers Avon Vale, Eridge, Heythrop, Beaufort, Dulverton, Hurworth and Southwold.) for the three fast merchant ships of Malta-bound Convoy MW.9. The convoy came under air attack on 13 February, and one of the merchant ships, Clan Campbell was hit and damaged, and forced to divert to Tobruk. The next day, the merchant ship Clan Chattan was hit and sunk, while Rowallan Castle was damaged and later scuttled. The next convoy from Egypt to Malta, Convoy MW.10, sailed in March. The 5th Flotilla, including Beaufort, left Alexandria on 19 March on an anti-submarine sweep ahead of the main body of the convoy which left on 20 March. The destroyer Heythrop from the 5th Flotilla was sunk by German submarine U-652 on 20 March, with the remainder of the 5th Flotilla refuelling at Tobruk before joining up with the main body of the convoy. On 22 March Italian warships, including the battleship Littorio and three heavy cruisers, attempted to attack, with the British deploying the cruisers and fleet destroyers against the surface threat, in the Second Battle of Sirte, while the Hunts of the 5th Flotilla remained with the convoy. While the Italian surface force was driven off, the course changes needed to avoid the Italians meant that the convoy could not reach Malta under cover of darkness as planned, and two of the four transports, Clan Campbell and Breconshire were hit by German and Italian bombers and sank before reaching Malta, while the remaining two merchant ships were sunk in harbour on 26 March before most of their cargo could be unloaded.

On 13 June 1942, another convoy set out for Malta from Egypt, under the codename Operation Vigorous, while at the same time, Operation Harpoon, the passage of another convoy from the west, sailed from Gibraltar. Beaufort formed part of the close escort for Vigorous. Heavy air attacks and the appearance of the Italian battle fleet forced Vigorous to be abandoned, with the convoy turning back to Egypt, with losses of the cruiser Hermione, the destroyers Airedale, Hasty and Nestor, and two merchant ships. On the night of 11/12 July, Beaufort, together with Dulverton, Eridge and Hurworth, bombarded the Italian-held port of Mersa Matruh, sinking the cargo ship Sturla, which had been driven out of harbour by an attack by Fleet Air Arm Fairey Albacore torpedo bombers. On 13–15 September 1942, Beaufort took part in Operation Agreement, an unsuccessful raid against Tobruk in which the cruiser Coventry and the destroyers Sikh and Zulu were lost.

In July 1943, Beaufort took part in the Allied invasion of Sicily, escorting an assault convoy to the beachhead as part of Escort Group P, and in September that year she supported the Allied landings at Salerno on mainland Italy. In October 1943, Beaufort was deployed to the Aegean Sea for the Dodecanese Campaign, attempting unsuccessfully (with Belvoir) to intercept a German convoy on the night of 15/16 October. On the night of 10/11 November 1943, Beaufort, in company with Faulknor and the Greek destroyer Pindos, shelled German-held Kos. On the nights of 12/13 and 13/14 November 1943, the three destroyers failed to find German shipping carrying invasion forces to Leros, while on 12 November they bombarded German troops on Leros. Their efforts did not stop the German invasion, however, and Leros surrendered to the Germans on 16 November. On 22 January 1944, Beaufort took part in the Allied landings at Anzio, Italy, and in August, Operation Dragoon, the Allied invasion of Southern France.

== Postwar service ==
On 10 June 1945 Beaufort arrived in Cardiff from the Mediterranean for a refit, however this was abandoned and she was towed to Devonport and placed in reserve. In 1947, she was placed in Category C2 reserve, also known as "Extended Reserve", being kept in case of a future emergency, but requiring a major refit before re-entering service. In 1949, the Reserve Fleet was re-organised, with Beaufort classified as in Category C Reserve, a similar type of Extended Reserve.

On 31 October 1951 Beaufort was loaned for a four-year period to the Royal Norwegian Navy, and after a refit, entered service with the new name Haugesund. In 1954 she was fitted with lattice masts and two Squid Anti-submarine mortars in place of the 'X' gun turret on the aft of the ship. In 1956, Haugesund was sold outright to Norway. She was scrapped in 1965.

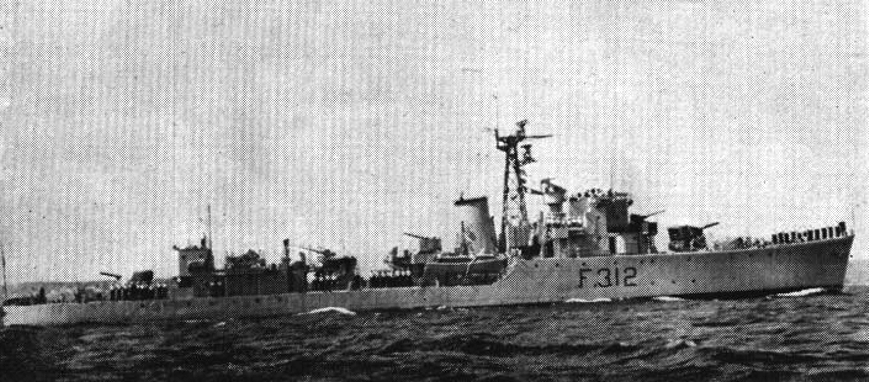
KNM Haugesund circa 1960.

== Bibliography ==
- Barnett, Correlli (2000). Engage The Enemy More Closely. London: Penguin. ISBN 0-141-39008-5.
- Blackman, Raymond V. B. (1963). Jane's Fighting Ships 1963–64. London: Sampson Low, Marston & Co. Ltd.
- Colledge, J. J.; Warlow, Ben (2006) [1969]. Ships of the Royal Navy: The Complete Record of All Fighting Ships of the Royal Navy from the 15th Century to the Present (3rd Rev ed.). London: Chatham Publishing. ISBN 978-1-86176-281-8. OCLC 67375475.
- English, John (1987). The Hunts: A history of the design, development and careers of the 86 destroyers of this class built for the Royal and Allied Navies during World War II. World Ship Society. ISBN 0-905617-44-4.
- Critchley, Mike (1982). British Warships Since 1945: Part 3: Destroyers. Liskeard, UK: Maritime Books. ISBN 0-9506323-9-2.
- Friedman, Norman (2008). British Destroyers and Frigates: The Second World War and After. Barnsley, UK: Seaforth Publishing. ISBN 978-1-84832-015-4.
- Gardiner, Robert; Chesneau, Roger, eds. (1980). Conway's All The World's Fighting Ships 1922–1946. London: Conway Maritime Press. ISBN 0-85177-146-7.
- O'Hara, Vincent P. (2009). Struggle for the Middle Sea: The Great Navies at War in the Mediterranean Theater, 1910–1945. Annapolis, Maryland, US: Naval Institute Press. ISBN 978-1-61251-408-6.
- Lenton, H. T. (1970). Navies of the Second World War: British Fleet & Escort Destroyers Volume Two. London: Macdonald & Co. ISBN 0-356-03122-5.
- Manning, T. D.; Walker, C. F. (1959). British Warship Names. London: Putnam.
- Rohwer, Jürgen; Hümmelchen, Gerhard (1992). Chronology of the War at Sea 1939–1945. London: Greenhill Books. ISBN 1-85367-117-7.
- Roskill, Stephen (1956). The War at Sea 1939–1945: Volume II: The Period of Balance. History of the Second World War: United Kingdom Military Series. London: Her Majesty's Stationery Office.
- Whitley, M. J. (2000). Destroyers of World War Two: An International Encyclopedia. London: Cassell & Co. ISBN 1-85409-521-8.
- Winser, John de S. (2002). British Invasion Fleets: The Mediterranean and Beyond 1942–1945. Gravesend, UK: World Ship Society. ISBN 0-9543310-0-1.
