= HMS Hursley =

Destroyer of the Royal Navy

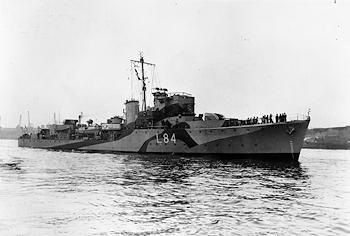
- HMS Hursley

History

United Kingdom
- Name: HMS Hursley
- Ordered: 20 December 1939
- Builder: Swan Hunter, Tyne and Wear, United Kingdom
- Laid down: 21 December 1940
- Launched: 25 July 1941
- Commissioned: 2 April 1942
- Identification: Pennant number: L84
- Honours and awards: Mediterranean 1942–43; Sicily 1943; Aegean 1943
- Fate: Transferred to Greece, 2 November 1943
- Badge: On a Field Red in front of a hunting horn erect the sails of a windmill White.

Greece
- Name: Kriti
- Acquired: 2 November 1943
- Fate: Returned to UK, 12 November 1959; Sold for scrapping, 27 April 1960

General characteristics
- Class & type: Hunt-class destroyer
- Displacement: 1,050 long tons (1,070 t) standard; 1,430 long tons (1,450 t) full load
- Length: 85.3 m (279 ft 10 in) o/a
- Beam: 9.6 m (31 ft 6 in)
- Draught: 2.51 m (8 ft 3 in)
- Propulsion: 2 Admiralty 3-drum boilers; 2 shaft Parsons geared turbines, 19,000 shp
- Speed: 27 knots (31 mph; 50 km/h); 25.5 kn (29.3 mph; 47.2 km/h) full
- Range: 3,600 nmi (6,700 km) at 14 kn (26 km/h)
- Complement: 164
- Armament: 6 × QF 4 in Mark XVI on twin mounts Mk. XIX; 4 × QF 2 pdr Mk. VIII on quad mount MK.VII; 2 × 20 mm Oerlikons on single mounts P Mk. III; 110 depth charges, 2 throwers, 3 racks

HMS Hursley was a Second World War Type II Hunt-class escort destroyer of the British Royal Navy. She is the only Royal Navy ship to have carried this name. Hursley is a village in Hampshire. Commissioned in 1942, she served in the Mediterranean, before being transferred to the Hellenic Navy in November 1943 and renamed Kriti. She took part in the landings in Sicily, Anzio, and southern France, and remained in Greek service until 1959.

== Design and construction ==
Hursley was ordered with 15 others of the same type on 20 December 1939 as part of the War Emergency Programme. The Hunts were meant to fill the Royal Navy's need for a large number of small destroyer-type vessels capable of both convoy escort and operations with the fleet. The Type II Hunts differed from the earlier ships in having increased beam in order to improve stability (Note: A design error caused the first Hunt, Atherstone to be dangerously unstable when built. The first 23 Hunts had a twin 4-inch mount removed, the ships' superstructure cut down and ballast fitted in order to restore adequate stability.) and carry the ships' originally intended armament.

Hursley was 264 feet 3 inches (80.54 m) long between perpendiculars and 280 feet (85.34 m) overall. The ship's beam was 31 feet 6 inches (9.60 m) and draught 7 feet 9 inches (2.36 m). Displacement was 1,050 long tons (1,070 t) standard and 1,490 long tons (1,510 t) under full load. Two Admiralty boilers raising steam at 300 pounds per square inch (2,100 kPa) and 620 °F (327 °C) fed Parsons single-reduction geared steam turbines that drove two propeller shafts, generating 19,000 shaft horsepower (14,000 kW) at 380 rpm. This gave a speed of 27 knots (50 km/h; 31 mph). Fuel capacity was 277 long tons (281 t) of oil, giving a design range of 2,560 nautical miles (4,740 km; 2,950 mi) (although in service use, this dropped to 1,550 nautical miles (2,870 km; 1,780 mi)).

The ship's main gun armament was six 4 inch (102 mm) QF Mk XVI dual purpose (anti-ship and anti-aircraft) guns in three twin mounts, with one mount forward and two aft. Additional close-in anti-aircraft armament was provided by a quadruple 2-pounder "pom-pom" mount and two single Oerlikon 20 mm cannon mounted in the bridge wings. Power-operated twin 20 mm Oerlikon mounts replaced the single Oerlikons during the war. Up to 110 depth charges could be carried. (Note: While Lenton and Friedman both state a capacity of 110 depth charges, Gardiner and Chesneau give a capacity of 30 or 60 charges.) The ship had a complement of 168 officers and men.

Hursley was laid down by Swan Hunter at Wallsend on 21 December 1940 as Admiralty Job No. J4139, launched on 25 July 1941, and completed on 2 April 1942. She was the first ship named Hursley to serve with the Royal Navy.

== Service history ==
=== HMS Hursley ===
After sea trials Hursley sailed for Scapa Flow for training. She formed part of the Home Fleet covering force for the Arctic convoy PQ 15 from Iceland to Murmansk and for the simultaneous west-bound convoy QP 11 in late April to early May 1942. Assigned to the Eastern Fleet, in May she joined the escort for Convoy WS 19 to Durban. There she was transferred to the 5th Destroyer Flotilla in the Mediterranean, owing to heavy losses in "Operation Vigorous", and sailed to Alexandria, Egypt, where she was deployed for flotilla duties in eastern Mediterranean.

On 29 August, Hursley, along with Aldenham and Eridge took part in bombardment operations against El Dabaa on the Egyptian coast. Eridge was hit by a torpedo from an Italian motor torpedo boat and badly damaged, being towed back to Alexandria by Aldenham. Hursley was returning from the operation when she was attacked by enemy aircraft and near missed by a bomb, causing minor damage. Hursley was under repair for 10 days. On 12–14 September 1943, Hursley took part in "Operation Agreement", a combined operations raid on the port of Tobruk. Hursley, as part of the 5th Flotilla, accompanied the anti-aircraft cruiser Coventry in a covering force. The destroyers Sikh and Zulu would land 350 troops at Tobruk, with a further 150 being landed by 18 Motor Torpedo Boats and 3 launches, while a land-based column would also attack the town. The operation proved to be a disaster, however. On the morning of 14 September, Sikh was badly damaged by shore fire while attempting to land her troops, and attempts by Zulu to tow her away failed, with Zulu being hit several times and Sikh being scuttled. Hursley's force was attacked by dive bombers as it was going to the assistance of Zulu, and Coventry was badly hit by bombs, and her crew forced to abandon ship. Croome and Hursley were ordered to scuttle the wreck of Coventry with gunfire, while the remaining ships of the Flotilla, which were short of fuel and laden with survivors of Coventry, returned to Alexandria. These attempts failed, and the two Hunts were then joined by Zulu, which then sank Coventry with torpedoes, before the three destroyers set course for base. The force came under sustained air attack, and Zulu was hit by a bomb and disabled. Hursley took Zulu in tow, but Zulu sank after sunset.

In October Hursley carried out two diversionary operations in support of the 8th Army operations "Lightfoot" and "Supercharge" during the battle of El Alamein. On 17 November she was deployed for the defence of the Malta relief Convoy MW 13 in "Operation Stone Age", coming under air attack, but arriving safely on the 19th, and returned to Alexandria on the 21st.

On 14 January 1943, while part of the escort for convoy ME 15, Hursley and the destroyer Pakenham sank the Narvalo, which was returning to Italy from delivering ammunition and fuel to Tripoli. The submarine was carrying 11 British prisoners of war. 28 Italians and 8 of the prisoners died in the sinking. On 19 February, Hursley was part of the escort for the Alexandria–Tripoli Convoy XT 3, when a Vickers Wellington bomber of 38 Squadron Royal Air Force spotted the German submarine U-562 at periscope depth north-east of Benghazi. The destroyer Isis was summoned from the convoy, but failed to get a sonar contact, as did Derwent, the senior ship of the convoy's escort. Hursley was then ordered to join Isis to carry out a prolonged hunt for the submarine while Derwent returned to the convoy. After about an hour, Hursley detected the submarine with her sonar, and the two destroyers carried out a series of depth charge attacks, during which U-562 briefly surfaced and was seen to have a "badly buckled" conning tower. In all, the two destroyers dropped 59 depth-charges in nine separate attacks before sonar contact was lost, and the two destroyers and the Wellington bomber were later credited with U-562's destruction. There were no survivors from the submarine.

Later that month, Hursley transferred to the 22nd Destroyer Flotilla, continuing convoy defence and support duties into April. In May she was deployed in "Operation Retribution", part of the blockade positioned in the Cap Bon area to intercept vessels evacuating enemy troops from North Africa. On 12 May she took part in a landing operation on the Tunisian island of Zembra with Aldenham and Hellenic Navy ship Kanaris, returning to Malta with captured enemy personnel.

After usual escort and support duties, in July she joined Support Force East as an escort for assault convoys and in support of landings during the Allied invasion of Sicily ("Operation Husky"). Hursley was attached to Escort Group R, and on 6 July sailed from Alexandria as part of the escort for the fast Convoy MWF 36, arriving at the "Acid" invasion beaches south of Syracuse on 7 July, before returning to Alexandria the next day to escort the follow-up Convoy MWS 36, which left Alexandria on 9 July and arrived at Syracuse on 13 July.

In September Hursley was attached to the Levant Flotilla to support military operations in the Dodecanese Campaign to occupy various Italian-occupied Greek islands after the armistice with Italy. On the night of 16/17 October 1943, Hursley, together with the destroyers Jervis, Penn and the Greek Miaoulis, carried out a search for a German convoy. They found the convoy after it had reached Kalymnos harbour, with Hursley and Miaoulis entering the harbour to attack the convoy, while the other two ships remained outside. Hursley and Miaoulis sank the German submarine chaser UJ-2109 (Note: UJ-2109 was formerly the British Hunt-class minesweeper Widnes, which had been captured by Germany after being grounded during the German invasion of Greece, had been subsequently salvaged and repaired by the Germans and put into service as a submarine chaser.) and the barge F338 and badly damaged the transport Trapani. In return, Hursley was hit by a single German shell that caused a 3 ft × 4 ft (0.91 m × 1.22 m) hole in the ship's port side and caused a minor fire. Trapani was sunk by Penn and Jervis the next night.

=== Kriti ===
On 2 November 1943, Hursley was transferred to the Royal Hellenic Navy and renamed Kriti ("Crete"). Despite her new name and new crew, the ship remained part of the 22nd Destroyer Flotilla. In January 1944 she was assigned to duties escorting convoys from North Africa to Naples. She was attached to the Southern Attack Force ("Force X") to support the landing by the U.S. VI Corps, forming part of the escort force. On 21 January she sailed from Naples, arriving at the beachhead on 22 January. Kriti remained at Anzio into February providing defence for military convoys and fire support for ground troops.

From March to July she returned to normal flotilla duties while based at Algiers, then in August took part in "Operation Dragoon", the invasion of Southern France. She sailed from Naples on 12 August as part of the escort of Convoy SF2, which comprised 38 LCIs, arriving at "Delta Beach" (Saint-Tropez) two days later.

Kriti resumed her usual duties in September, but was transferred to the British Aegean Force to support military operations to re-occupy the Aegean islands and Greek mainland. She was engaged in supporting military operations in the Aegean until the end of the war in Europe in May 1945.

After V-E Day she was transferred on loan to the Royal Hellenic Navy and remained there until 12 December 1959 when she reverted to Royal Navy control and was placed on the Disposal List.

== Bibliography ==
- Blair, Clay (2000). Hitler's U-Boat War: The Hunted, 1942–1945. New York: Modern Library. ISBN 0-679-64033-9.
- Colledge, J. J.; Warlow, Ben (2006) [1969]. Ships of the Royal Navy: The Complete Record of All Fighting Ships of the Royal Navy from the 15th Century to the Present (3rd Rev ed.). London: Chatham Publishing. ISBN 978-1-86176-281-8. OCLC 67375475.
- English, John (1987). The Hunts: A history of the design, development and careers of the 86 destroyers of this class built for the Royal and Allied Navies during World War II. World Ship Society. ISBN 0-905617-44-4.
- Friedman, Norman (2008). British Destroyers and Frigates: The Second World War and After. Barnsley, UK: Seaforth Publishing. ISBN 978-1-84832-015-4.
- Gardiner, Robert; Chesneau, Roger, eds. (1980). Conway's All The World's Fighting Ships 1922–1946. London: Conway Maritime Press. ISBN 0-85177-146-7.
- Gröner, Erich; Jung, Dieter; Maass, Martin (1993). Die deutschen Kriegsschiffe 1915–1945: Band 8/1: Flußfahrzeuge, Ujäger, Vorpostenboote, Hilfminensucher, Küstenschutzverbände (Teil 1) (in German). Bonn: Bernard & Graefe Verlag. ISBN 3-7637-4807-5.
- H.M. Ships Damaged or Sunk by Enemy Action: 3rd. SEPT. 1939 to 2nd. SEPT. 1945. Admiralty. 1952. Archived from the original on 2 November 2023.
- Kemp, Paul (1999). The Admiralty regrets: British warship losses of the 20th century. Stroud, UK: Sutton Publishing Limited. ISBN 0-7509-1567-6.
- Kemp, Paul (1997). U-Boats Destroyed: German Submarine Losses in the World Wars. London: Arms & Armour Press. ISBN 1-85409-321-5.
- Lenton, H. T. (1970). Navies of the Second World War: British Fleet & Escort Destroyers Volume Two. London: Macdonald & Co. ISBN 0-356-03122-5.
- O'Hara, Vincent P. (2009). Struggle for the Middle Sea: The Great Navies at War in the Mediterranean Theater, 1910–1945. Annapolis, Maryland, US: Naval Institute Press. ISBN 978-1-61251-408-6.
- Rohwer, Jürgen; Hümmelchen, Gerhard (1992). Chronology of the War at Sea 1939–1945. London: Greenhill Books. ISBN 1-85367-117-7.
- Roskill, S. W. (1956). The War at Sea 1939–1945: Volume II: The Period of Balance. History of the Second World War: United Kingdom Military Series. London: Her Majesty's Stationery Office.
- Roskill, S. W. (1960). The War at Sea 1939–1945: Volume III: The Offensive: Part I. History of the Second World War: United Kingdom Military Series. London: Her Majesty's Stationery Office.
- Ruegg, Bob; Hague, Arnold (1993). Convoys to Russia: 1941–1945. Kendal, UK: World Ship Society. ISBN 0-905617-66-5.
- Smith, Peter C. (2008). Massacre at Tobruk: The British Assault on Rommel, 1942. Mechanicsburg, Pennsylvania, US: Stackpole Books. ISBN 978-0-8117-3474-5.
- Whitley, M. J. (2000). Destroyers of World War Two: An International Encyclopedia. London: Cassell & Co. ISBN 1-85409-521-8.
- Winser, John de S. (2002). British Invasion Fleets: The Mediterranean and Beyond 1942–1945. Gravesend, UK: World Ship Society. ISBN 0-9543310-0-1.
