= Force K =

British Royal Navy task forces during the Second World War

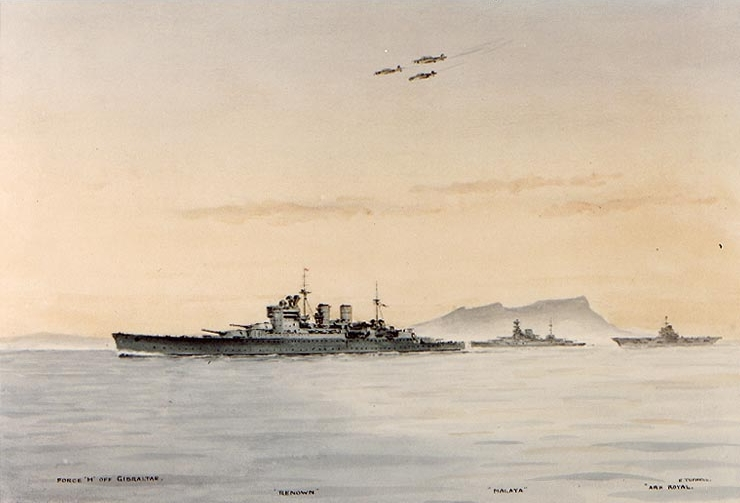
- HMS Renown was part of the first Force K
- Active: 1939–1942
- Country: United Kingdom
- Branch: Royal Navy
- Garrison/HQ: Gibraltar
- Engagements: Battle of the Atlantic; Battle of the River Plate; Battle of the Mediterranean; Battle of the Duisburg Convoy; First Battle of Sirte; Operation Stoneage

Commanders
- Notable commanders: William Agnew; Henry Harwood; Andrew Cunningham

Force K was the name given to three British Royal Navy groups of ships during the Second World War. The first Force K operated from West Africa in 1939, to intercept commerce raiders. The second Force K was formed in October 1941 at Malta, to operate against convoys sailing from Italy to Libya. Axis air attacks on Malta led to Force K being reduced and on 8 April 1942, the last ship of the force was withdrawn. After a convoy was run to Malta in Operation Stoneage (16–20 November) Force K was re-established against Axis convoys.

== Force K (1939) ==
The Admiralty suspected that a German pocket battleship was at large and on 1 October 1939 it became certain that a raider was operating in the South Atlantic when the crew of SS Clement was landed in South America but who mistakenly named the raider as Admiral Scheer rather than the pocket battleship Admiral Graf Spee. On 5 October the Admiralty formed eight groups, Forces F, G, H, I, K, L, M and N to hunt the German cruisers. Searching in the South Atlantic was conducted mostly by Forces G, H and K under the command of Admiral George d'Oyly Lyon the Commander-in-Chief, South Atlantic.

Location map of Sierra Leone

Force K was based in Freetown, Sierra Leone and consisted of the battlecruiser HMS Renown, the aircraft carrier Ark Royal and destroyers Hardy, Hostile, Hereward and Hasty. Force K was to track and destroy German commerce raiders in the South Atlantic, including Graf Spee. In December 1939, after the Battle of the River Plate, Force K was sent to the coast of Uruguay to prevent any sortie by Graf Spee, whose captain had taken the ship into Montevideo harbour. After Graf Spee was scuttled, Force K was disbanded and Ark Royal escorted the heavy cruiser HMS Exeter, which had been damaged by Graf Spee, to Britain.

== Force K (January 1941) ==
Force K was a force composed of the heavy cruisers Norfolk and Devonshire to search for German surface raiders in the South Atlantic between January and February 1941.

== Force K (October 1941) ==
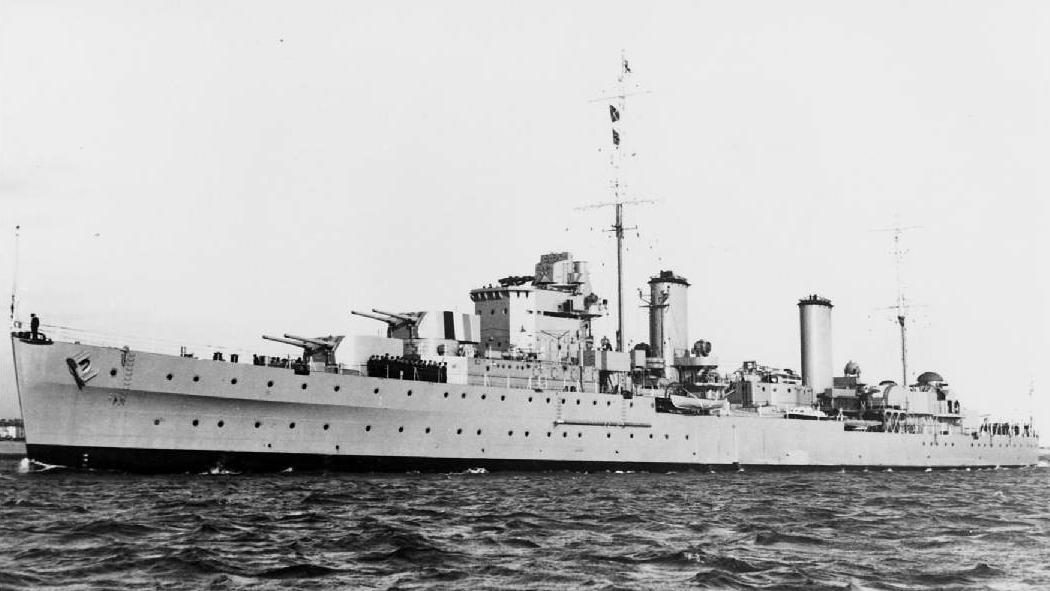
HMS Aurora in 1938

Force K was re-created on 21 October 1941, with the light cruisers HMS Aurora and Penelope and the destroyers Lance and Lively, to operate from Malta against Italian ships carrying supplies to the Axis forces in North Africa. On the night of 8/9 November 1941, in the Battle of the Duisburg Convoy, Force K sank the convoy, forcing Comando Supremo, the supreme command of the Italian armed forces, to consider Tripoli "practically blockaded". Convoys to Tripoli were suspended, only Benghazi remaining in use. Soon afterwards, Force K was reinforced at Malta by Force B, comprising the light cruisers HMS Ajax and Neptune and the destroyers HMS Kandahar and Jaguar. The combined force was so effective that in November 1941, the Axis supply line suffered 60 per cent losses.

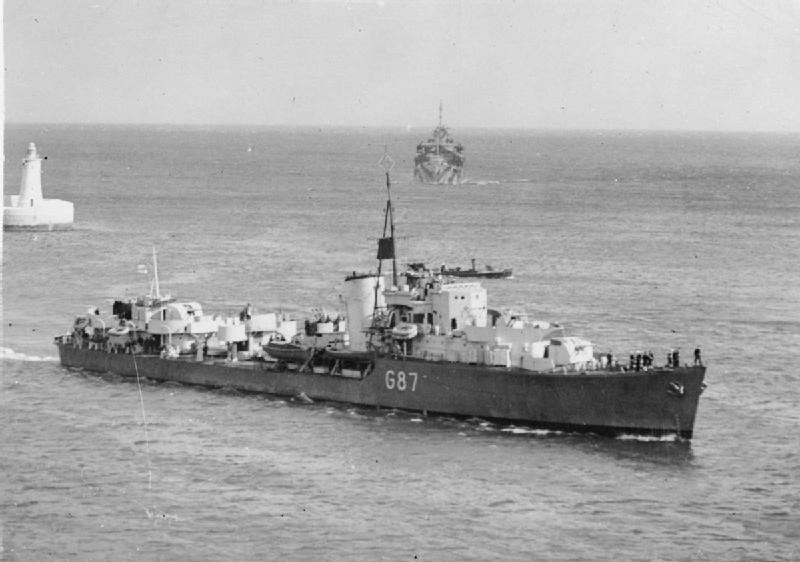
HMS Lance entering Grand Harbour, Malta

On 19 December, at about the time of the First Battle of Sirte, ships from both forces ran into an Italian minefield (including German deep water mines) while pursuing an Italian convoy. Neptune was sunk and Aurora damaged. The destroyer Kandahar also struck a mine while attempting to assist Neptune and was scuttled the next day by the destroyer Jaguar. Following this and with a resurgence of the Axis aerial bombardment of Malta, the remaining surface ships were withdrawn after the Second Battle of Sirte in late March, except for Penelope, which was too badly damaged to leave. Frequent air attacks while she remained in harbour earned Penelope the nickname "HMS Pepperpot"; the light cruiser sailed for Gibraltar on 8 April 1942, terminating the second Force K.

== Force K (1942) ==
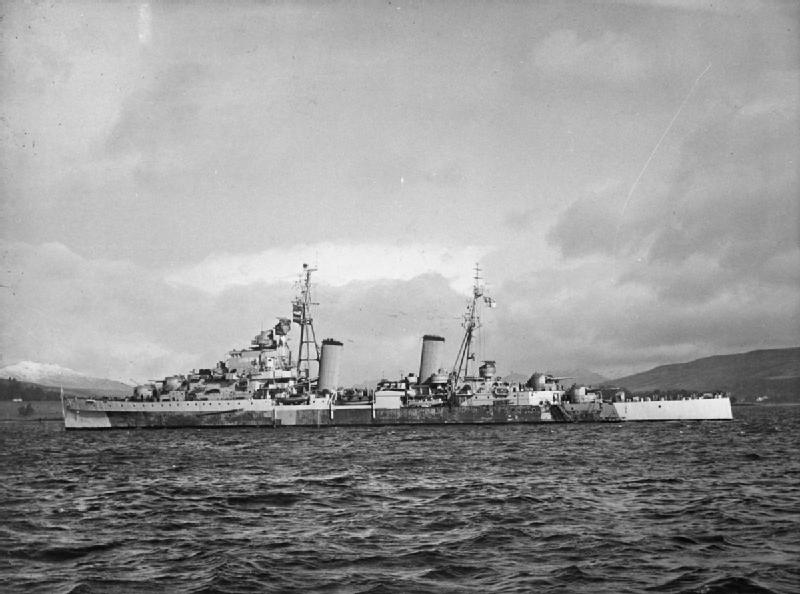
HMS Cleopatra (photographed in 1945 IWM FL 5210)

Operation Stoneage (16–20 November 1942), a convoy to re-victual Malta, was unloaded in record time. The supplies brought to Malta enabled the third Force K to be established on 27 November, with the cruisers HMS Cleopatra, Dido, Euryalus and four ships of the 14th Destroyer Flotilla. Stephen Roskill, the official historian of the Royal Navy, wrote in 1962 that the arrival of Stoneage ended the two-year siege of Malta. Submarines were transferred from Magic Carpet rides (supply runs) to offensive operations and at the end of November, 821 Naval Air Squadron (Albacores) transferred to Malta as did Force K; a Motor Torpedo Boat flotilla arrived soon afterwards.

Another cruiser and destroyer force began to operate from Bône in Algeria, which, from 1 December, enabled the Navy to attack Axis convoys to Tunisia from both directions. In 2003, Richard Woodman wrote that Stoneage delivered 35,000 short tons (32,000 t) of supplies, which advanced the deadline at which Malta would be compelled to surrender for lack of supplies to mid-December. The Eighth Army had expelled the Axis forces from Egypt and Cyrenaica, having entered Benghazi on 20 November. In Tunisia, the First Army was about 40 mi (64 km) from Bizerta, preparing for its next advance. Allied success on land made convoy operations much safer and Operation Portcullis, the next Malta convoy, arrived safely on 5 December.

== See also ==
- Force B
- Force H
- Force Z
- Malta Convoys

== Bibliography ==
- DiNardo, R. L. (2005). Germany and the Axis Powers from Coalition to Collapse. Lawrence, KS: University Press of Kansas. ISBN 978-0-7006-1412-7.
- Playfair, I. S. O.; Flynn, F. C.; Molony, C. J. C. & Toomer, S. E. (2004) [1956]. Butler, J. R. M. (ed.). The Mediterranean and Middle East: The Germans come to the help of their Ally (1941). History of the Second World War, United Kingdom Military Series. Vol. II (repr. Naval & Military Press ed.). London: HMSO. ISBN 1-84574-066-1.
- Playfair, I. S. O.; Flynn, F. C.; Molony, C. J. C. & Gleave, T. P. (2004a) [1960]. Butler, J. R. M. (ed.). The Mediterranean and Middle East: British Fortunes reach their Lowest Ebb (September 1941 to September 1942). History of the Second World War United Kingdom Military Series. Vol. III (pbk. repr. Naval & Military Press ed.). HMSO. ISBN 1-84574-067-X.
- Playfair, I. S. O.; Flynn, F. C.; Molony, C. J. C. & Gleave, T. P. (2004b) [1966]. Butler, J. R. M. (ed.). The Mediterranean and Middle East: The Destruction of the Axis Forces in Africa. History of the Second World War United Kingdom Military Series. Vol. IV. Uckfield: Naval & Military Press. ISBN 1-84574-068-8.
- Roskill, S. W. (1957) [1954]. Butler, J. R. M. (ed.). The War at Sea 1939–1945: The Defensive. History of the Second World War United Kingdom Military Series. Vol. I (4th impr. ed.). London: HMSO. OCLC 881709135.
- Roskill, S. W. (1962) [1956]. Butler, J. R. M. (ed.). The War at Sea 1939–1945: The Period of Balance. History of the Second World War United Kingdom Military Series. Vol. II (3rd impression ed.). London: HMSO. OCLC 174453986.
- Smith, Peter C.; Dominy, John R. (1980). Cruisers In Action 1939-1945. London: William Kimber. ISBN 0718302184.
- Stegemann, B.; et al. (2015) [1995]. "Part I Chapter 3: The Strategic Dilemma of the summer and Autumn of 1940: An Alternative or Interim Strategy c. The Offensive against Sidi Barrani". In Falla, P. S. (ed.). The Mediterranean, South-East Europe and North Africa, 1939–1941: From Italy's Declaration of non-Belligerence to the Entry of the United States into the War. Germany and the Second World War. Vol. III. Translated by McMurry, D. S.; Osers, E.; Willmot, L. (2nd pbk. trans. Oxford University Press, Oxford ed.). Freiburg im Breisgau: Militärgeschichtliches Forschungsamt. ISBN 978-0-19-873832-9.
- Woodman, Richard (2000). Malta Convoys 1940–1943. London: John Murray. ISBN 0-7195-6408-5.
