= HMS Pakenham (G06) =

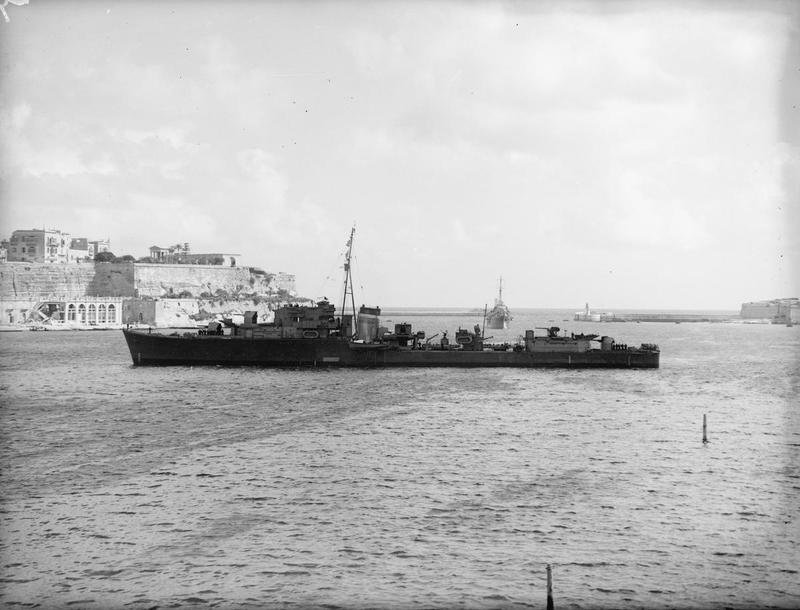
- HMS Pakenham (G06)

History

United Kingdom
- Name: HMS Pakenham
- Namesake: Admiral Sir Thomas Pakenham
- Ordered: 20 October 1939
- Builder: Hawthorn Leslie, Hebburn
- Laid down: 6 February 1940
- Launched: 28 January 1941
- Completed: 4 February 1942
- Honours and awards: Battle honours: Diego Suarez 1942; Mediterranean 1942–43
- Fate: Scuttled off Sicily after surface action on 16 April 1943

General characteristics
- Class & type: P-class destroyer
- Displacement: 1,690 long tons (1,720 t) standard; 2,250 long tons (2,290 t) full load
- Length: 345 ft (105 m) o/a
- Beam: 35 ft (10.7 m)
- Draught: 9 ft (2.7 m)
- Installed power: 40,000 shp (30,000 kW); 2 × Admiralty 3-drum boilers
- Propulsion: 2 shafts; Parsons geared steam turbines
- Speed: 36.75 knots (68.06 km/h; 42.29 mph)
- Range: 3,850 nmi (7,130 km; 4,430 mi) at 20 knots (37 km/h; 23 mph)
- Complement: 228
- Armament: 5 × single QF 4 in Mk.V (102 mm) guns; 1 × quadruple QF 2-pdr Mk.VIII AA guns; Up to 6 × single QF 20 mm Oerlikon AA guns; 1 × quadruple 21-inch torpedo tubes; 4 × throwers and 2 × racks for 70 depth charges

HMS Pakenham (G06) was a P-class destroyer of the British Royal Navy built and operated during World War II. Commissioned in early 1942, she took part in the invasion of Madagascar, and several Malta Convoys, before being disabled in a battle with Italian torpedo boats in April 1943 and scuttled.

== Service history ==
Pakenham was ordered from Hawthorn Leslie and Company at Hebburn on 2 October 1939, as part of the War Emergency Programme, and laid down as Onslow on 6 February 1940. She was launched on 28 January 1941. In August 1941, during construction, her name was changed to Pakenham. She was fitted with additional facilities to act as flotilla leader, and was finally completed on 4 February 1942.

Under the command of Captain Eric Barry Kenyon Stevens, Pakenham sailed to the Indian Ocean in April 1942 to take part in Operation Ironclad, the amphibious landing to capture of the port of Diego Suarez, at the start of the British campaign to capture the Vichy French-controlled island of Madagascar.

Pakenham was then transferred to the Mediterranean Fleet based at Alexandria, and took part in Operation Vigorous, a failed attempt to escort a convoy taking supplies to the besieged island of Malta. In August she took part in a diversionary operation during Operation Pedestal, which succeeded in getting several supply ships to Malta despite heavy losses.

In October Pakenham was one of the ships that attacked and forced to the surface the German submarine U-559. Abandoned by her crew, the submarine was boarded by men from Petard and vital codebooks were recovered before she sank.

In November and December she took part in two successful convoys to Malta (Operation Stone Age and Operation Portcullis).

Pakenham had a series of successes in January 1943. In company with Hursley she sank the Italian Squalo-class submarine Narvalo on the 14th; sank the Italian naval auxiliary vessel Tanaro on the 16th; and along with Nubian and the Greek Vasilissa Olga, Pakenham sank the Italian transport ship Stromboli on the 18th.

=== Sinking ===
Now under the command of Commander Basil Jones, early on 16 April Pakenham and Paladin engaged the Italian Spica-class torpedo boats Cigno and Cassiopea, which were the forward escort of a convoy composed of the transport ship Belluno and the torpedo boat Tifone, which was carrying aviation fuel for Bizerte in her fore holds. While Belluno and Tifone slipped away, the forward escort fought a short action, in which Cigno was crippled by gunfire from Pakenham, then torpedoed by Paladin and sunk. Cassiopea limped away badly damaged, but Pakenham had been hit by shell fire from Cigno and Cassiopea six times, putting her engines and a boiler out of commission, with some flooding in the engine room. Ten members of her crew were killed in action. Paladin attempted to tow her to Malta, but by morning the threat of enemy air attacks forced her to embark Pakenham's crew, and then to scuttle the disabled destroyer by torpedo southwest of Sicily, at position 37°26′N 12°30′E.
