= HMS Croome (L62) =

Destroyer of the Royal Navy

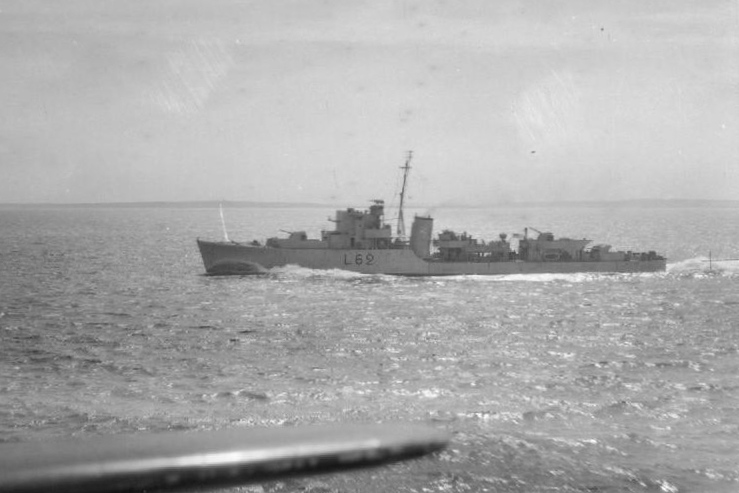
- Croome underway during World War II

History

United Kingdom
- Name: HMS Croome
- Builder: Alexander Stephen and Sons
- Laid down: 7 June 1940
- Launched: 30 January 1941
- Commissioned: 29 June 1941
- Identification: Pennant number: L62
- Fate: Scrapped at Briton Ferry, Wales on 13 August 1957.

General characteristics
- Class & type: Type II Hunt-class destroyer
- Displacement: 1,050 long tons (1,070 t) standard; 1,430 long tons (1,450 t) full load
- Length: 85.3 m (279 ft 10 in) o/a
- Beam: 9.6 m (31 ft 6 in)
- Draught: 2.51 m (8 ft 3 in)
- Propulsion: 2 Admiralty 3-drum boilers; 2 shaft Parsons geared turbines, 19,000 shp (14,000 kW)
- Speed: 27 knots (31 mph; 50 km/h); 25.5 kn (29.3 mph; 47.2 km/h) full
- Range: 3,600 nmi (6,700 km) at 14 kn (26 km/h)
- Complement: 164
- Armament: 6 × QF 4-inch (102 mm) Mark XVI on twin mounts Mk. XIX; 4 × QF 2 pdr Mk. VIII on quad mount MK.VII; 2 × 20 mm Oerlikons on single mounts P Mk. III; 110 depth charges, 2 throwers, 3 racks

HMS Croome was a Type II Hunt-class destroyer of the Royal Navy. She served in the Second World War, spending much of the time in the Mediterranean, operating from the ports at Gibraltar and Alexandria.

== Service history ==
=== Sinking of Baracca ===
On 8 September 1941 Croome was escorting Convoy OG 75, en route from Liverpool to Gibraltar. While conducting a forward sweep Croome spotted the Italian submarine Maggiore Baracca on the surface at 8,500 yards. Baracca dived as Croome turned towards her at full speed. After two depth-charge attacks, Baracca surfaced astern of Croome, which opened fire with all guns as she went about. The Italian submarine returned fire with her main gun but the shots went wide, the gun deck was then cleared by Croome's Lewis guns. As Croome approached, the Italians began to abandon ship. Croome rammed Baracca just abaft the conning tower. The submarine sank immediately by the stern and exploded underwater. After picking up survivors, Croome headed for Gibraltar while the crew shored-up the flooded forward compartments, damaged by the ramming. A DSO, a DSC and two DSMs were awarded for the action. 28 Italians were killed.

=== Sinking of U-127 and U-581 ===
On 15 December 1941 Croome and the destroyers Gurkha, Foxhound and HMAS Nestor were detached from Force H to run a sweep ahead of convoy HG 76. Nestor found and sank the German submarine U-127 with all hands.

On 2 February 1942 Croome, the destroyers Westcott and Exmoor and a corvette were sent to escort the damaged troopship Llangibby Castle, which had taken refuge from attack by two U-boats in the neutral port of Horta, in the Azores. They made contact with U-581 by asdic in the channel outside Horta and attacked her with depth charges. The U-boat was eventually forced to surface, where she was fired on by Croome and Westcott. Westcott rammed U-581 and the whole crew were able to escape before she sank. However, Westcott ran back through the survivors in the water and dropped another depth charge, resulting in four deaths and a number of casualties.

=== Malta convoys ===
Between 5 and 9 March 1942 Croome, with the rest of Force H, escorted the old aircraft carriers Eagle and Argus which were ferrying 15 Spitfire fighters from Gibraltar to Malta.

Between 12 and 16 June 1942 Croome was one of 27 destroyers and eight cruisers escorting 11 merchant ships to re-supply Malta from Alexandria. Codenamed Operation Vigorous, the convoy was forced to turn back because of a sortie by the Italian battle-fleet from Taranto and heavy air attacks.

On 4 August 1942 Croome, Sikh, Tetcott and Zulu attacked U-372, which had been spotted by an RAF Wellington bomber near Haifa, Palestine. The U-boat was forced to the surface with depth charges and sank shortly afterwards. The whole crew was captured.

Between 13 and 14 September 1942, Croome, Hursley, Zulu and Sikh took part in a night bombardment of Tobruk. Zulu was hit by shore batteries and then bombed by enemy aircraft. Croome went alongside to take off survivors and Zulu was taken in tow by Hursley, but capsized and sank 100 miles (160 km) from Alexandria after further air attack.

== Postwar and fate ==
Croome survived the war and in October 1945 returned to Devonport from the Mediterranean. She was then paid off into reserve. She was almost sold to the Royal Danish Navy in 1954, but other sister-ships were bought instead. Croome was finally sold for scrap to Thos. W. Ward and arrived at Briton Ferry, Wales for breaking up on 13 August 1957.

== Publications ==
- Colledge, J. J.; Warlow, Ben (2006) [1969]. Ships of the Royal Navy: The Complete Record of All Fighting Ships of the Royal Navy from the 15th Century to the Present (3rd Rev ed.). London: Chatham Publishing. ISBN 978-1-86176-281-8. OCLC 67375475.
- English, John (1987). The Hunts: a history of the design, development and careers of the 86 destroyers of this class built for the Royal and Allied Navies during World War II. England: World Ship Society. ISBN 0-905617-44-4.
