= HMS Exmoor (L61) =

Destroyer of the Royal Navy

Coordinates: 52°30′N 02°04′E

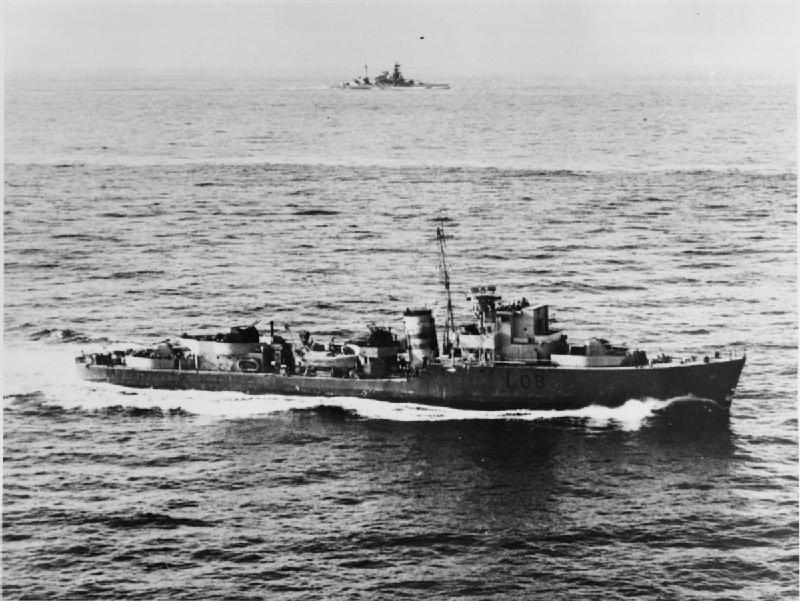

History

United Kingdom
- Name: HMS Exmoor
- Ordered: 1939
- Builder: Vickers-Armstrongs, Tyneside
- Laid down: 8 June 1939
- Launched: 25 January 1940
- Commissioned: 18 October 1940
- Honours and awards: North Sea, 1941
- Fate: Sunk on 25 February 1941
- Badge: On a Field Red, two foxes brushes in Saltire between two mullets Gold.

General characteristics
- Class & type: Hunt-class destroyer
- Displacement: 1,000 long tons (1,016 t) standard; 1,340 long tons (1,362 t) full load
- Length: 280 ft (85 m)
- Beam: 29 ft (8.8 m)
- Draught: 10 ft 9 in (3.28 m)
- Propulsion: Two x Admiralty 3 drum boilers; Two shaft Parsons geared turbines; 19,000 shp
- Speed: 27.5 kn (50.9 km/h; 31.6 mph) (26 kn (48 km/h; 30 mph) full)
- Range: 3,500 nmi (6,480 km) at 15 knots (28 km/h) / 1,000 nmi (2,000 km) at 26 knots (48 km/h)
- Complement: 146
- Armament: 4 × QF 4-inch (102 mm) Mark XVI guns on twin mounts Mk. XIX; 4 × QF 2-pounder (40 mm) Mk VIII AA guns on quad mount MK.VII; 2 × 20-mm Oerlikon AA guns on single mounts P Mk. III; 40 depth charges, 2 throwers, 1 rack

HMS Exmoor was a Hunt-class destroyer of the Royal Navy. She was a member of the first subgroup of the class, and saw service in the Second World War, before being sunk by German E-boats in 1941.

== Construction and commissioning ==
Exmoor was ordered under the 1939 Naval Building Programme from Parsons Marine Steam Turbines Company, with the hull building being subcontracted to the Vickers-Armstrongs yard, Tyneside. She was laid down as Job No J4099 on 8 June 1939 and launched on 25 January 1940. She was commissioned into service on 18 October 1940, and after working up, was assigned to the 16th Destroyer Flotilla at Scapa Flow.

== Career ==
Exmoor arrived at the Home Fleet at Scapa Flow in November, and on 6 November was detached in company with Pytchley to escort the merchant ship SS Adda to the Faeroe Islands. Exmoor returned on 11 November and resumed her working up period. In December she escorted the armed merchant cruisers Chitral and Salopian on their way to begin patrols. Exmoor then sailed to Plymouth.

In January Exmoor was part of the escort for the battleship Queen Elizabeth as she sailed from Portsmouth to Rosyth. Exmoor then sailed to Harwich to begin escorting coastal convoys through the North Sea with the 16th Destroyer Flotilla. She carried out these duties into February, and on 23 February was deployed with Shearwater to escort a convoy from the Thames estuary to Methil. The convoy was attacked by E-boats as it passed off Lowestoft on 25 February. Exmoor suffered an explosion aft, suffering major structural damage and rupturing a fuel supply line. A fire soon broke out which spread rapidly. Exmoor capsized and sank in ten minutes. The survivors were picked up by Shearwater and the trawler Commander Evans, and were taken to Great Yarmouth. Exmoor had either been hit by a torpedo fired by the E-Boat S30 commanded by Klaus Feldt, as the Germans claimed, or had struck a mine as the Admiralty claimed. The wreck is designated as a protected place under the Protection of Military Remains Act 1986. During a 2008-2011 marine biology survey of the area in which she was sunk, the RV Cefas Endeavour discovered the wreck.

A later Hunt-class destroyer, previously planned as HMS Burton, was renamed and launched as Exmoor.
