= HMS Belvoir (L32) =

Hunt-class destroyer of the Royal Navy

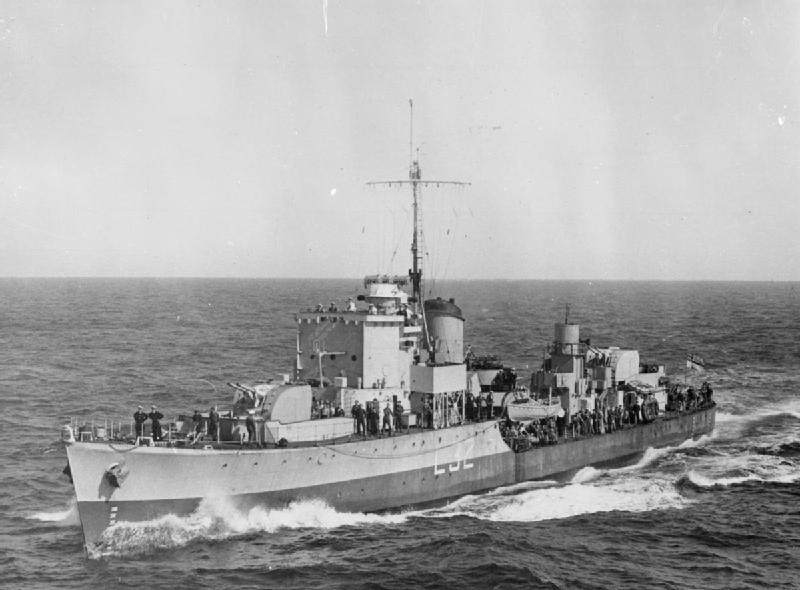
- HMS Belvoir, 29 May 1945 (IWM)

History

United Kingdom
- Name: HMS Belvoir
- Ordered: 4 July 1940
- Builder: Cammell Laird, Birkenhead
- Laid down: 14 October 1940
- Launched: 18 November 1941
- Completed: 29 March 1942
- Honours and awards: Sicily 1943; Salerno 1943; Aegean 1943; South France 1944; Adriatic 1944
- Fate: Scrapped 1957
- Badge: On a Field White, a Peacock's head erased Proper enfiled with a ducal coronet

General characteristics
- Class & type: Type III Hunt-class destroyer
- Displacement: 1,050 long tons (1,070 t) standard; 1,435 long tons (1,458 t) full load
- Length: 85.3 m (279 ft 10 in) o/a
- Beam: 10.16 m (33 ft 4 in)
- Draught: 3.51 m (11 ft 6 in)
- Propulsion: 2 Admiralty 3-drum boilers; 2 shaft Parsons geared turbines, 19,000 shp (14,000 kW)
- Speed: 27 knots (31 mph; 50 km/h); 25.5 kn (29.3 mph; 47.2 km/h) full
- Range: 2,350 nmi (4,350 km) at 20 kn (37 km/h)
- Complement: 168
- Armament: 4 × QF 4 in Mark XVI guns on twin mounts Mk. XIX; 4 × QF 2 pdr Mk. VIII on quad mount MK.VII; 2 × 20 mm Oerlikons on single mounts P Mk. III; 2 × 21 in (533 mm) torpedo tubes; 110 depth charges, 4 throwers, 3 racks

HMS Belvoir was a Hunt-class destroyer of the Royal Navy. She was a member of the third subgroup of the class, and saw service in the Second World War. She was adopted by the civil community of Sutton in Ashfield, Nottinghamshire during Warship Week in 1942.

== Service history ==
On commissioning Belvoir was deployed to Scapa Flow for service with the Home Fleet. She was subsequently allocated to the 2nd Destroyer Flotilla and escorted convoys to South Africa, then transferred to the Mediterranean, including service escorting Malta Convoys. In 1943 she took part in escort duties as part of Operation Husky, the allied landings in Sicily and subsequently the landings at Salerno.

In 1944 she was prepared for service as part of the Allied landings in the south of France and subsequently in the Adriatic. In June 1945 she returned to the UK for paying off.

In 1946 she was reduced to reserve status and laid up at Portsmouth. She was placed on the disposal list in 1957 and sold. She was scrapped by McLennan, arriving at their yard at Bo'Ness on 21 October 1957.

== Publications ==
- Colledge, J. J.; Warlow, Ben (2006) [1969]. Ships of the Royal Navy: The Complete Record of All Fighting Ships of the Royal Navy from the 15th Century to the Present (3rd Rev ed.). London: Chatham Publishing. ISBN 978-1-86176-281-8. OCLC 67375475.
- English, John (1987). The Hunts: A History of the Design, Development and Careers of the 86 Destroyers of this class Built for the Royal and Allied Navies during World War II. Windsor: World Ship Society. ISBN 0-905617-44-4.
