= HMS Tetcott =

Destroyer of the Royal Navy

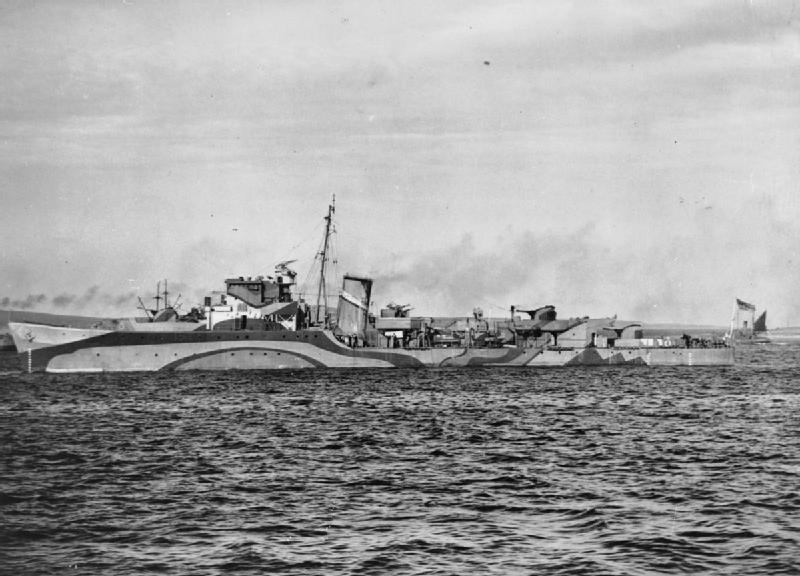
- Tetcott on a convoy to Russia, March 1942

History

United Kingdom
- Name: HMS Tetcott
- Ordered: 20 December 1939
- Builder: J. Samuel White
- Laid down: 29 July 1940
- Launched: 12 August 1941
- Commissioned: 2 December 1941
- Identification: Pennant number: L99
- Honours and awards: Libya 1942; Mediterranean 1942; Sicily 1943; Salerno 1943; Aegean 1943–44; Anzio 1944; Adriatic 1944
- Fate: Arrived Thos. W. Ward, Milford Haven for breaking up 24 September 1956, completed 9 April 1957
- Badge: On a Field White, within an annulet murrey, a demi unicorn erased Black.

General characteristics
- Class & type: Type II Hunt-class destroyer
- Displacement: 1,050 long tons (1,070 t) standard; 1,430 long tons (1,450 t) full load
- Length: 85.3 m (279 ft 10 in) o/a
- Beam: 9.6 m (31 ft 6 in)
- Draught: 2.51 m (8 ft 3 in)
- Propulsion: 2 Admiralty 3-drum boilers; 2 shaft Parsons geared turbines, 19,000 shp
- Speed: 27 knots (31 mph; 50 km/h); 25.5 kn (29.3 mph; 47.2 km/h) full
- Range: 3,600 nmi (6,700 km) at 14 kn (26 km/h)
- Complement: 164
- Armament: 6 × QF 4-inch (102 mm) Mark XVI guns on twin mounts Mk. XIX; 4 × QF 2-pounder (40-mm) Mk VIII guns on quad mount MK.VII; 2 × 20 mm Oerlikon guns on single mounts P Mk. III; 110 depth charges, 2 throwers, 3 racks

HMS Tetcott was a Type II British Hunt-class destroyer built for the Royal Navy during World War II. She was the only Royal Navy ship to be named after the Tetcott fox hunt.

== Wartime service ==
=== 1941 ===
Following completion on 11 December 1941 the ship headed for Scapa Flow where it arrived on 16 December and joined the Home Fleet. The vessel collided with the corvette Heartsease on 23 December which meant that the next two months were spent in repair on the Clyde and later in Southampton.

=== 1942 ===
The vessel was finally ready for service again on 2 March 1942 and returned to Scapa Flow for working-up. On 15 April 1942 Tetcott joined convoy WS18 at the ocean escort Clyde Assembly point. The ship escorted this convoy to Cape Town, detaching briefly to call into Freetown on the way.

At Cape Town, Tetcott headed into the Indian Ocean and on to Alexandria via the Red Sea and the Suez Canal, arriving in early June 1942 where she joined the 9th Destroyer Flotilla.

On 10 June the ship sailed with Grove carrying supplies to the garrison at Tobruk. Grove was torpedoed on 12 June during the return journey and Tetcott picked up the survivors. On 16 June the ship came under heavy Axis air attack whilst defending of ships returning to Alexandria following the termination of Operation Vigorous.

In July the ship operated as part of Operation Exporter off Palestine and Syria. On 4 August, with the destroyers Sikh and Zulu the ship attacked the German submarine U-372 and forced the U-boat to the surface. 16 German crew and a Lebanese civilian were rescued.

In September 1942, the ship was assigned with Hero to convoy duties in the Red Sea, but returned to the Mediterranean in October. In November 1942, the ship formed part of the close escort for Convoy MW13, from Alexandria to Malta. This convoy succeeded in reaching Malta, and the ship formed part of the close escort on the return journey. In December, Tetcott was one of the escorts in the Alexandria to Malta convoy, MW14, after which she joined the 22nd Destroyer Flotilla at Algiers.

=== 1943 ===
In January 1943 the ship escorted Orion from Malta to Alexandria during cover for passage of a Malta and on 1 February rescued survivors from the minelayer Welshman which had been torpedoed off Sollum. She continued patrol and escort duties in the eastern and central Mediterranean for the next two months.

In July she took part on Operation Husky, the invasion of Sicily, and in September the Salerno landing, Operation Avalanche.

=== 1944 ===
In January 1944, the ship was assigned to the Northern Attack Force for Operation Shingle, the Anzio Landings, and provided shore bombardment in support of the landings.

From February until August 1944, the ship operated in the Adriatic Sea providing shore bombardment and operating as a convoy escort. In September she supported the invasion of the Aegean islands, and then worked as part of the liberation of Greece. Deployments off Greece and Albania continued until March 1945.

=== 1945 ===
Tetcott then operated off the Italian coast, and was slightly damaged in April during the bombardment of Genoa. The ship returned to the UK, arriving at Portsmouth on 21 May before heading to Gibraltar in June for a refit, which started on 5 July.

== Post-war ==
The ship was due to be assigned to the Indian Ocean following the refit but this was cancelled with the surrender of Japan and instead the refit was cut short and the ship placed in reserve on 17 January 1946 before heading back to the UK.

In November 1952, it was announced that the ship would be preserved at the Penarth Docks, but this plan failed. Instead the ship was towed to Gibraltar where she remained until September 1955 when she was towed back to the Barrow in Furness, in Extended Reserve, having had much of her equipment removed and the vessel no longer maintained and placed on the Disposal List. In January 1956 Tetcott was reclassified as a hulk and in August transferred to BISCO for scrapping.

== Publications ==
- Colledge, J. J.; Warlow, Ben (2006) [1969]. Ships of the Royal Navy: The Complete Record of All Fighting Ships of the Royal Navy from the 15th Century to the Present (3rd Rev ed.). London: Chatham Publishing. ISBN 978-1-86176-281-8. OCLC 67375475.
- English, John (1987). The Hunts: a history of the design, development and careers of the 86 destroyers of this class built for the Royal and Allied Navies during World War II. England: World Ship Society. ISBN 0-905617-44-4.
