= Battle of Leros =

WWII battle on Greek island in 1943

- Part of the Dodecanese campaign of World War II
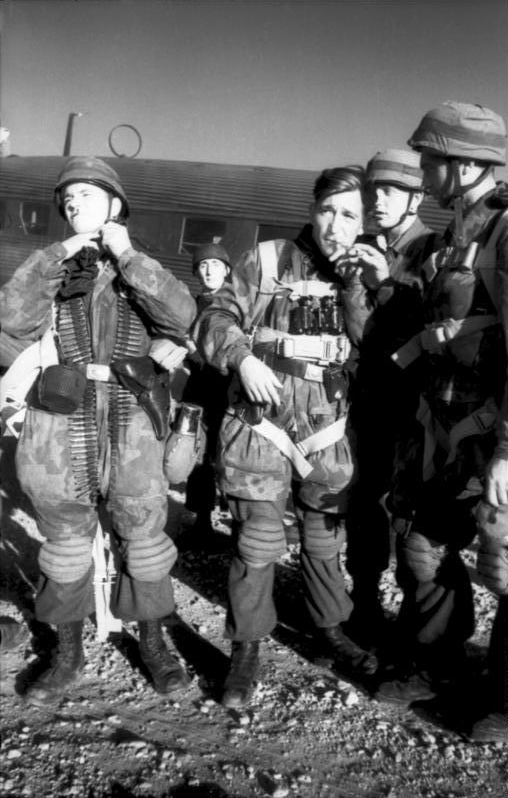
- German Fallschirmjäger paratroopers prepare to be flown to Leros
| Date | 26 September – 16 November 1943 |
| Location | Leros Island, Aegean Sea 37°7′55″N 26°51′10″E |
| Result | German victory |

Belligerents
| (Kingdom of Italy) Italy; United Kingdom; Naval Support: (Union of South Africa) South Africa; Greece | (Nazi Germany) Germany |

Commanders and leaders
| (Kingdom of Italy) Luigi Mascherpa (surrendered); (United Kingdom) Robert Tilney (surrendered) | (Nazi Germany) Friedrich-Wilhelm Müller |

Strength
| Italian: 8,320 soldiers and sailors; British: 3,500+ soldiers; 74 Squadron, RAF; 7 Squadron, SAAF | 2,800 German troops; Luftwaffe |

Casualties and losses
| Italian: 300 killed or missing; 5,350 POW; 1 destroyer sunk; 5 auxiliary and merchant ships sunk; 5 MAS boats sunk; British:c. 600 killed; 100 wounded; 3,200 POW; RAF: 115 aircraft lost; 3 destroyers sunk; Greek: 1 destroyer sunk; 68 killed | 512 killed; 900 wounded; 5+ Marinefährprahme |
- 20 civilians killed (Leros Islanders)

The Battle of Leros (26 September and 16 November 1943) took place on the Greek island of Leros between the Allies and invading forces of Nazi Germany. Regarded as the central event of the Dodecanese campaign of the Second World War, the term is widely used as an alternative name for the campaign. After the Armistice of Cassibile the Italian garrison on the Greek island Leros was strengthened by British forces on 15 September 1943. The battle began with German air attacks, continued with the landings on 12 November and ended with the capitulation of the Allied forces four days later.

== Background ==
=== Armistice ===
After the Italian government had signed the armistice, the Italian garrisons on most of the Dodecanese either wanted to change sides and fight alongside the Allies or go home. The British tried to exploit this but the Germans were ready. As the Italian surrender became apparent, German forces, based largely in mainland Greece, were rushed to many of the major islands to gain control. The most important such force, the Sturm-Division Rhodos swiftly neutralised the garrison of Rhodes, denying its three airfields to the British.

=== Operation Accolade ===
After the Battle of Greece in April 1941 and the Battle of Crete (20 May – 1 June 1941) Greece and its many islands were occupied by German, Italian and Bulgarian forces. With the Armistice of Cassibile on 8 September 1943 the Greek islands, which were seen as strategically important by Winston Churchill, became a feasible objective for the first time since the loss of Crete.

The United States was sceptical about operations in the Aegean, which it saw as an unnecessary diversion from the Italian Campaign. This was confirmed at the Quebec Conference, where it was decided to divert all available shipping from the Eastern Mediterranean. The British persisted, albeit with a much smaller force. Air cover was limited with the US and British aircraft based in Cyprus and the Middle East, exacerbated by the withdrawal of the US units in late October to the Italian Campaign.

=== Kos and other islands ===
By mid-September, the 234th Infantry Brigade (Major-General F. G. R. Brittorous) the former Malta garrison, detachments of the Special Boat Service (SBS) and Long Range Desert Group (LRDG) had secured the islands of Kos, Kalymnos, Samos, Leros, Symi and Astypalaia, supported by ships of the Royal Navy, Royal Hellenic Navy and two RAF Spitfire squadrons on Kos. The 22nd Infantry Division on Crete (Generalleutnant Friedrich-Wilhelm Müller) was ordered to take Kos and Leros on 23 September.

=== Unternehmen Eisbär ===
The British forces on Kos, under the command of Lieutenant Colonel L. R. F. Kenyon, numbered about 1,500 men, 680 of whom were from the 1st Battalion Durham Light Infantry, 120 men from 11th Parachute Battalion, a number of men from the SBS, the rest being mainly RAF personnel and c. 3,500 Italians, primarily made up by the troops of the 10th Infantry Regiment "Regina" from the 50th Infantry Division "Regina". On 3 October, the Germans effected amphibious and airborne landings of Unternehmen Eisbär (Operation Polar Bear), reaching the outskirts of the capital later that day. The British withdrew under cover of night and surrendered the next day. The fall of Kos was a serious blow to the British, depriving them of air cover. The Germans captured 1,388 British and 3,145 Italian prisoners. On 4 October, German troops conducted the Massacre of Kos, in which Colonello Felice Leggio, and 101 of his officers were shot according to the 11 September order from Adolf Hitler to execute captured Italian officers.

=== Leros ===
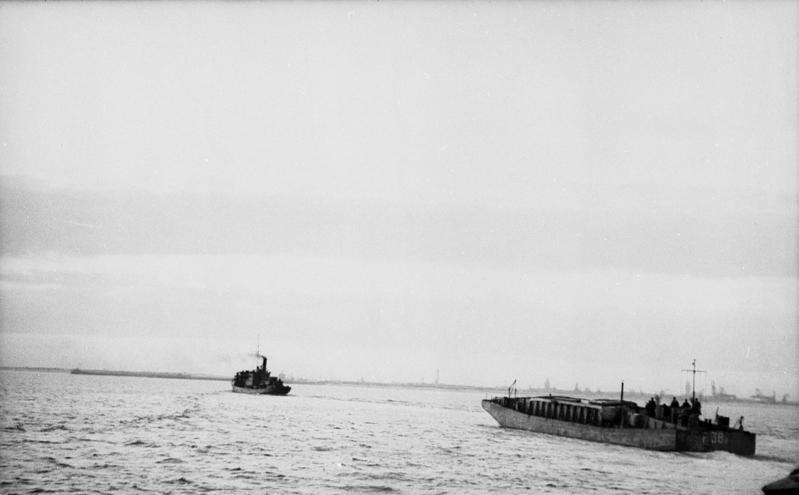
A Marinefährprahm (MFP) in 1942

The island of Leros is part of the Dodecanese archipelago in the south-eastern Aegean Sea. The island had been under Italian occupation since the Italo-Turkish War (29 September 1911 to 18 October 1912). During Italian rule, Leros, with its excellent deep-water port of Portolago (now Lakki), was developed into a fortified aeronautical and naval base, "the Corregidor of the Mediterranean", as Mussolini boasted. The island was base for some Italian naval units, in September 1943 the 4ª Squadriglia Cacciatorpediniere (4th Destroyer Flotilla) with the destroyer Euro, III Flottiglia MAS (third MAS Flotilla) with two motor torpedo boats and six MAS, the XXXIX Minesweeper Flotilla with eleven boats and nine minor units, seven merchant ships, the Azio-class minelayers Azio and Legnano and three Italian-built Marinefährprahme.

== Prelude ==
=== Allied forces ===
The Italian garrison of Leros numbered about 7,600 men, under the command of Captain Luigi Mascherpa. The vast majority of these men – 6,065, plus an additional 697 militarised personnel – belonged to the Royal Italian Navy, as Leros was mainly a naval base. The rest of the Italian force consisted of the I Fusilier Battalion of the 10th Infantry Regiment "Regina", the 8th Coastal Machine Gunners Company, and the 402nd Militia Machine Gunners Company from the Regio Esercito and 20 Regia Aeronautica reservists. Only about 1,000 were first-line troops; most belonged to technical and service units or to anti-aircraft detachments. The island's defences included thirteen coastal batteries (armed with nineteen 152 mm guns, five 102 mm guns, and twenty 76 mm guns), twelve anti-aircraft and dual purpose batteries (armed with fourteen 102 mm guns, six 90 mm guns, and twenty-eight 76 mm guns), and several machine guns (three 37 mm, fifteen 20 mm, and thirty-one 13.2 mm). Most of these, however, were poorly protected from air assault and, accordingly, would suffer badly from Luftwaffe attacks. The clauses of the armistice determined that all Italian naval vessels were to head for Malta or other Allied-controlled bases but Mascherpa persuaded the British command to allow his ships to remain in Leros, since they would be of more use there in the event of a German attack. The only aircraft available were seven outmoded CANT Z. 501 floatplanes

After the fall of Rhodes, some men from its garrison reached Leros and Mascherpa assumed command of all Italian naval forces in the Aegean and re-organised the Leros anti-aircraft defences. On 12 September, a delegation of British officers met Mascherpa to assess the island's defences and to inquire about what relations could be established between Italian and British troops; Mascherpa did not go too far in his replies, since the terms of the armistice were still rather vague. On the following day, more British officers arrived, including Major George Jellicoe and Colonel Turbull, who was disappointed by the state of the defences, particularly the anti-aircraft preparations. The Italians made the decision to fire on any German aircraft that flew over Leros. On 13 September, the Germans invited the Italians to surrender with "honourable conditions", which Mascherpa refused.

On 17 September the small Italian garrison of Alimia, after leaving their island on board two fishing boats, reached Leros with their weapons. The influx of soldiers from Rhodes and Alimia brought the total Italian troop strength to 8,320 and on the same day the first 400 British reinforcements arrived. On 20 September Captain Mascherpa, upon hearing that Major-General Frank G. R. Brittorous was coming to Leros, asked Supermarina, the high command of the Regia Marina for advancement to the rank of rear admiral, so that he would not be junior in rank to Brittorous. This was granted. On the same day, Brittorous reached Leros with 600 more men, food and equipment (carried by a steamer, two destroyers and smaller vessels). Brittorous published a proclamation in which he stated that he was in command and all Italian commands were subordinated to him; this immediately created friction with Mascherpa, who had been confirmed in command of all Italian forces on Leros, as well as the civilian population but was now subordinated to Brittorous. Both officers asked their commands for reinforcements, food and ammunitions but little arrived.

By October, the British forces on the island of Leros numbered ca. 3,000 men of the 2nd Bn The Royal Irish Fusiliers, (under Lt Col Maurice French), the 4th Bn The Buffs (The Royal East Kent Regiment) (Lt Col Douglas Iggulden), the 1st Bn The King's Own Royal Regiment (Lancaster), and a company of the 2nd Bn Queen's Own Royal West Kent Regiment, the whole force under Brigadier Robert Tilney, who assumed command on 5 November. Initially, the British had planned to secure the high ground of the island's interior, but Brig Tilney insisted on a forward defence on the coastline, which spread his forces too thinly.

The air force units detailed for this operation were not large. Apart from Dakota transport aircraft, there were two day and two night Beaufighter squadrons, a Wellington torpedo bomber squadron, three Baltimore and one Hudson General Reconnaissance squadrons and a detachment of Photographic Reconnaissance Spitfires. This force was based on the mainland of Africa and in Cyprus. Two heavy bomber squadrons, 178 Squadron and 462 Squadron RAAF of 240 Wing equipped with Liberators and Halifaxes and a Wing of the US IX Bomber Command took part at a later stage. The only real defensive force were two Spitfire squadrons 7 SAAF and 74 Squadron RAF. The number of aircraft was 144 fighters (single and twin-engined) and 116 heavy, medium and torpedo bombers; 115 were lost.

=== German forces ===
The German forces assembling for Unternehmen Leopard (Operation Leopard) comprised III./Infanterie-Regiment 440, II./IR 16 and II./IR 65 of the 22nd Infantry Division, the parachutists of I./Fallschirmjäger (FJR) 2, and an amphibious commando company of the Brandenburg Division (1./Küstenjägerabteilung). The invasion force assembled in harbours in Kos and Kalymnos, with reserves and heavy equipment waiting to be airlifted around Athens. Two groups with Ju 87 D3 dive-bombers were available for close air support. I./Gruppe of Schlachtgeschwader 3 flew from their base in Megara and II./Gruppe from Argos and later Rhodos. II Gruppe of Kampfgeschwader 51 with Junkers Ju 88s were available for bombing.

On the night of 6/7 October, in the Astypalaia channel, the cruisers HMS Sirius and Penelope and the destroyers HMS Faulknor and Fury attacked a German troop convoy consisting of the auxiliary submarine chaser UJ 2111 (former Italian gunboat Tramaglio), the cargo ship Olympus and seven MFPs, sinking all but one MFP. These troops were meant as a reinforcement to the force for Operation Leopard and the destruction of the convoy caused the operation to be delayed.

=== Luftwaffe ===
X. Fliegerkorps raids
| Date | Raids | Sorties |
|---|---|---|
| 26 September | 2 | 25 |
| 27 September | 1 | 30 |
| 28 September | — | — |
| 29 September | 3 | 60 |
| 30 September | 3 | 60 |
| 1 October | — | — |
| 2 October | — | — |
| 3 October | 4 | 50 |
| 4 October | 4 | 50 |
| 5 October | 5 | 79 |
| 6 October | 5 | 78 |
| 7 October | 5 | 80 |
| 8 October | 4 | 18 |
| 9 October | 6 | 29 |
| 10 October | 3 | 76 |
| 11 October | 3 | 24 |
| 12 October | 8 | 62 |
| 13 October | — | — |
| 14 October | 3 | 65 |
| 15 October | 10 | 34 |
| 16 October | 11 | 76 |
| 17 October | 7 | 28 |
| 18 October | 2 | 28 |
| 19 October | 6 | 24 |
| 20 October | 2 | 28 |
| 21 October | — | — |
| 22 October | 11 | 44 |
| 23 October | 5 | 47 |
| 24 October | 4 | 15 |
| 25 October | 4 | 16 |
| 26 October | 11 | 50 |
| 27 October | 4 | 16 |
| 28 October | — | — |
| 29 October | — | — |
| 30 October | 1 | 5 |
| 31 October | 1 | 6 |
| Totals | 141 | 1,203 |

Starting on 26 September, after days of dropping propaganda leaflets, the Luftwaffe began attacks on Leros, enjoying air superiority. On that day, Ju 88 bombers sank the Greek destroyer Vasilissa Olga, the British destroyer HMS Intrepid and the Italian MAS 534 inside the harbour of Lakki. The submarine base, the barracks of the naval base, the workshops, and four of the five fuel depots (but not the one which actually contained fuel) were destroyed; seven German bombers were shot down.

Between 26 September and 11 November Leros was continuously bombed, an average of four raids and 41 bomber sorties per day between 26 and 30 September and eight raids of 37 bomber sorties daily between 7 October and 11 November. In addition to military objectives, the villages and towns, especially Leros and Lakki, suffered heavy damage. Hospitals had to be transferred to caves, and 10 per cent of coastal batteries, 30 per cent of anti-torpedo boat batteries and 20 per cent of anti-aircraft guns were destroyed.

The air base was bombed and rendered useless on 27 September. On 3 October, the Italian destroyer Euro was sunk in Partheni bay; on 5 October the minelayer Legnano, the auxiliary landing ship Porto di Roma, the steamer Prode and one Italian MFP were sunk in Lakki harbour. On 7 October the Italian steamer Ivorea was sunk. On 12 October the Italian steamer Bucintoro was sunk inside a floating dry dock. The Italian motor torpedo boat MS 15 was sunk by an air strike on Leros on 22 October, while MS 26 had been lost to grounding on 9 October

The anti-aircraft batteries were prime targets for attack; they often ran out of ammunition or became fatigued from continuous firing but the dive bombing technique used by the Stukas allowed the AA crews to foresee where bombs would fall, and to shoot at the bombers as they pulled out of their dives, when they were particularly vulnerable. The Italian battery on Mt Patella shot down eight bombers.

Kalimnos had fallen to the Germans on 7 September, and three days later the batteries of Leros had started firing on that island. This continuous firing, along with the constant air strikes, wore the guns, and seriously depleted their ammunition; the local command asked for more ammunition, and the destroyers Artigliere and Velite were sent from Taranto, but most of their cargo of ammunition was unloaded during their stop in Alexandria, so only a small part of them was eventually delivered to Leros. In the last part of October, Italian and British submarines made several supply runs to Leros, HMS Rorqual (three), Severn (three), the Italian submarines Zoea (two), Atropo (one), Filippo Corridoni (one) and Ciro Menotti (one). The submarines brought 17 men, 225 tons of supplies, twelve 40 mm Bofors guns and a jeep to Leros. Aircraft were also used for transport of supplies. Despite all efforts, ammunition was still scarce, whereas food and medicines would last for many months.

On the night between 24 and 25 October, HMS Eclipse, while carrying part of 4th Battalion, Royal East Kents, Buffs, along with HMS Petard, struck a mine and sank with the loss of 253 men; about 300 survivors of the battalion reached Leros on 30 October. On 29 October, HMS Unsparing sank the German steamer Ingeborg S. off Astypalaia.

Between 1 and 6 November, while German forces were being concentrated for the attack, the German air offensive was temporarily halted. During the same period, ships and submarines brought to Leros another 1,280 men and 213 tons of supplies, including ammunition. On 3 November, German landing craft were concentrated in Laurium, and between 6 and 10 November they were transferred to Kos and Kalimnos. On 5 November, Brigadier Robert Tilney arrived in Leros and assumed command; also Major-General H. R. Hall arrived, and replaced Brittorous, who left for Alexandria (Hall would leave for Samos on the night between 11 and 12 November). Mascherpa was not forewarned of the substitution; he was asked to go to Cairo to discuss the situation on the island, but he refused, fearing that he would not be allowed to go back to Leros to lead the defence. Relations between Mascherpa and Tilney were tense from the beginning; upon arrival, Tilney stated that the Italian forces would not take part in any counterattack or have any initiative, relegating them to tasks of fixed coastal defence (with order not to abandon their positions for any reason), and put each sector of the defence under a British colonel. The British commando even asked for Mascherpa to be substituted, and Supermarina decided to replace him with Captain Dairetti, but this was never carried out due to subsequent events.

On 7 November, the Luftwaffe resumed the bombing; over the next five days, 187 German bomber sorties carried out forty raids over the islands, especially targeting the batteries on the eastern part of the island (the area designated for the main landing) and those in the central and southern part (so that they would stop firing against Kalimnos), as well as the Anti-Aircraft and Coastal Defense Command (aiming to destroy coordination between the batteries) and the area of Lakki and Mt. Maraviglia, where British troops were concentrated. These last raids worsened the wear of the guns, disrupted communication routes and caused further consumption of ammunition. A British ammunition depot near Lakki was hit and blew up, causing more damage.

== Battle ==
=== 12 November ===
At 04.30, after almost fifty days of air strikes, an invasion fleet landed troops at Palma Bay and Pasta di Sopra on the north-east coast. British motor torpedo boats and the Italian MAS 555 spotted the German ships between 03:00 and 03:30, but the reaction was delayed by communication problems and by uncertainty whether they were German or more British ships with reinforcements. German troops were thus able to land, and only at dawn did the situation become clear. The Italian batteries Ducci and San Giorgio opened fire and drove off a convoy of six Marinefährprahme escorted by two Torpedoboote Ausland (Italian ships captured in Greece), heading for Gurna Bay.

There were other landings at Pandeli Bay (where the Italian Lago battery fired on the landing convoys), near Leros town, that were heavily contested by the Royal Irish Fusiliers. The Fusiliers stopped the capture of some key defensive positions but were unable to stop the landings. In the northeastern sector, a German force of six auxiliary gunboats, two armed trawlers, three MFPs, 25 landing craft, one steamer and five miscellaneous units, escorted by two captured Italian destroyers and two ex-Italian torpedo boats, as well as by minesweepers and motor torpedo boats. The Italian 888 battery in Blefuti sank two MFPs and damaged others, forcing them to stop the landing; the few German soldiers who had already landed were left without support and defeated, 85 of them being taken prisoner.

In the central part of the island the Germans, despite counter-action, managed to create small bridgeheads and in the afternoon, after heavy fighting, they captured the Italian Ciano battery on Mount Clido. The Italian MAS 555 and 559 were also captured in Grifo Bay; MAS 555 was fired upon and destroyed by Italian batteries to prevent its use by the Germans, whereas MAS 559 was sabotaged by her crew on the following day. Severe fighting developed around the Lago battery (Sub-Lt. Corrado Spagnolo) defended by its gunners and by an Italian Navy platoon sent as a reinforcement in a hand-to-hand combat. A British company was also sent to help, but had to withdraw after suffering heavy losses.

=== German consolidation ===
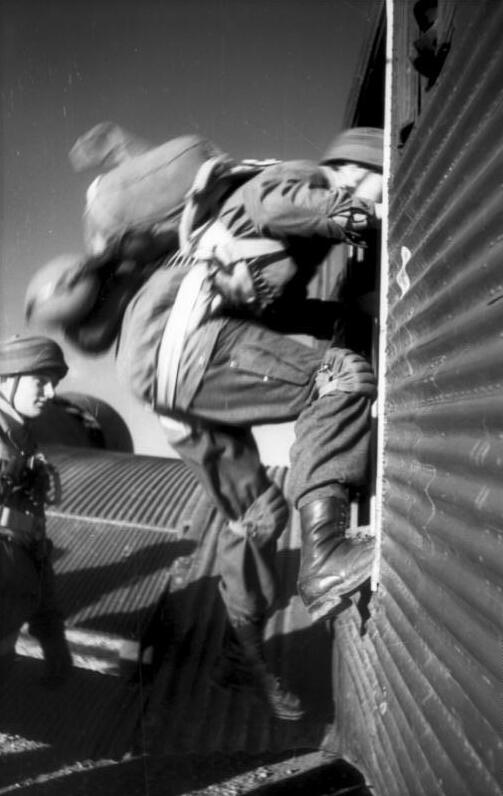
Paratroopers board a Junkers Ju 52 bound for Leros

The positions of the British units were spread around the island with poor communication between them. The attacking German forces had the twin advantages of local numerical superiority and air control. In the early afternoon Luftwaffe fighter-bombers machine-gunned and bombed the area between the Gurna and Alinda Bays, followed by Junkers Ju 52s which at 13:27 dropped some 600 parachutists from the Brandenburg Division over Mount Rachi. Some German aircraft were shot down by the batteries and about half of the paratroopers were killed, but the rest of them landed safely and attacked the nearby batteries, meeting stiff resistance and suffering heavy losses. One of them, no. 211, was captured before dark, and its commander, Lt. Antonino Lo Presti, was executed. The position of these landings effectively divided the island in two, separating the Buffs and a company of the King's Own on the south side of the island from the rest of the garrison. Counter-attacks during the rest of that day failed.

During the night of 12/13 November more German reinforcements arrived. Counterattacks by the King's Own and the Fusiliers failed during the 13th with heavy casualties, but the Buffs on the north side of the island managed to capture 130 prisoners and reclaim some control of their area. On the same day, the two sections of the no. 763 battery were captured by the paratroopers; another Italian officer (Lt. Fedele Atella), in charge of the Alinda area, was executed after capture. Italian 47/32 mm guns were captured in the same area. The Ciano battery, attacked by German forces supported by Luftwaffe planes, resisted until all the guns were put out of action; after capture, its officers were executed. In the morning of 13 November, following a new launch of parachutists, the Lago battery was also captured. Mascherpa asked General Mario Soldarelli in Samos for reinforcements and air cover, but in vain.

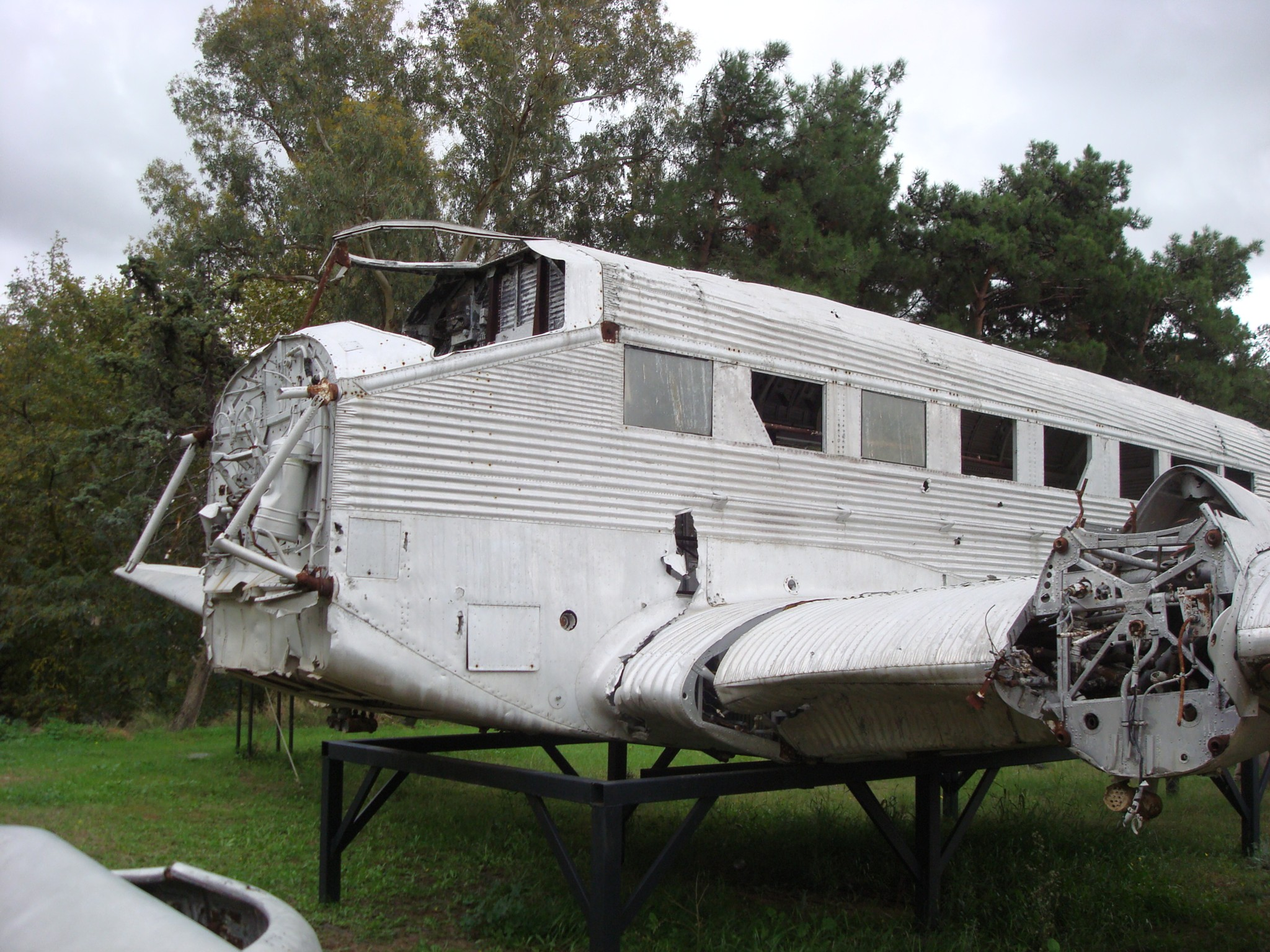
Wreck of a Junkers Ju 52 shot down over Leros on 13 November and salvaged by the Hellenic Air Force in 2003. Now at the Hellenic Air Force Museum

On the night of 14 November, British forces recaptured some batteries and positions and, supported by Italian artillery, prevented the Fallschirmjäger from rejoining the German landing troops; new German attacks later in the day, however, led to the capture of Alinda Bay, Grifo Bay, Mount Clidi, Mount Vedetta and Mout Appetici. On the night between 14 and 15 November the German forces invaded the town of Leros and the villages of Alinda and Santa Marina, while the destroyers HMS Echo and Belvoir landed 500 more men at Lakki, and Penn, Blencathra and Aldenham bombarded German positions and sank some German landing craft. On the same day, Dulverton was sunk by the Luftwaffe while trying to bring supplies to the garrison of Leros, with the loss of 78 men. On the night of 14 November two more companies of the Royal West Kent Regiment and their commanding officer, Lt Col Ben Tarleton, from Samos landed at Portolago Bay. British counter-attacks on that day were sporadic and carried out by fragmented forces, were ineffective and weakened the central sector of the island; with the help of two Royal Navy destroyers, it was possible to recapture the Ciano battery, taking over 230 prisoners.

The fighting on the 14th and 15th was mostly inconclusive with more casualties on both sides, although a counter-attack by two companies of the King's Own succeeded in recapturing part of Apetiki. Lt Col French was killed in this attack. German forces attacked the castle; the commander of the local British platoon ordered it to be abandoned, but Italian Navy personnel instead kept defending it.

On the night of 15/16 November the fourth company from the West Kents was landed and 170 German prisoners were taken to Samos. The Germans, on the other hand, landed an estimated 1,000 troops and artillery during that night. The defenders were left with only one tenth of their light weapons, and the German troops had reached the town of Leros and kept attacking the castle. Italian commanders asked Tilney to be allowed to have a more active part in the defence, but they were not listened to.

By the evening of 15 November, the island was cut in two, and the situation hopeless. During the night Lt. Col. John Richard Easonsmith, commander of the Long Range Desert Group, was killed in action while fighting inside the town of Leros. At dawn on 16 November, the no. 306 battery was destroyed by German airstrikes; the no. 127 battery on Mt. Maraviglia was attacked by German forces but stiffly defended by its garrison, commanded by Captain Werther Cacciatori, who lost an arm. At 12:30 the German command commanded Rear Admiral Mascherpa to surrender with his Italian forces, but he refused.

=== Surrender ===
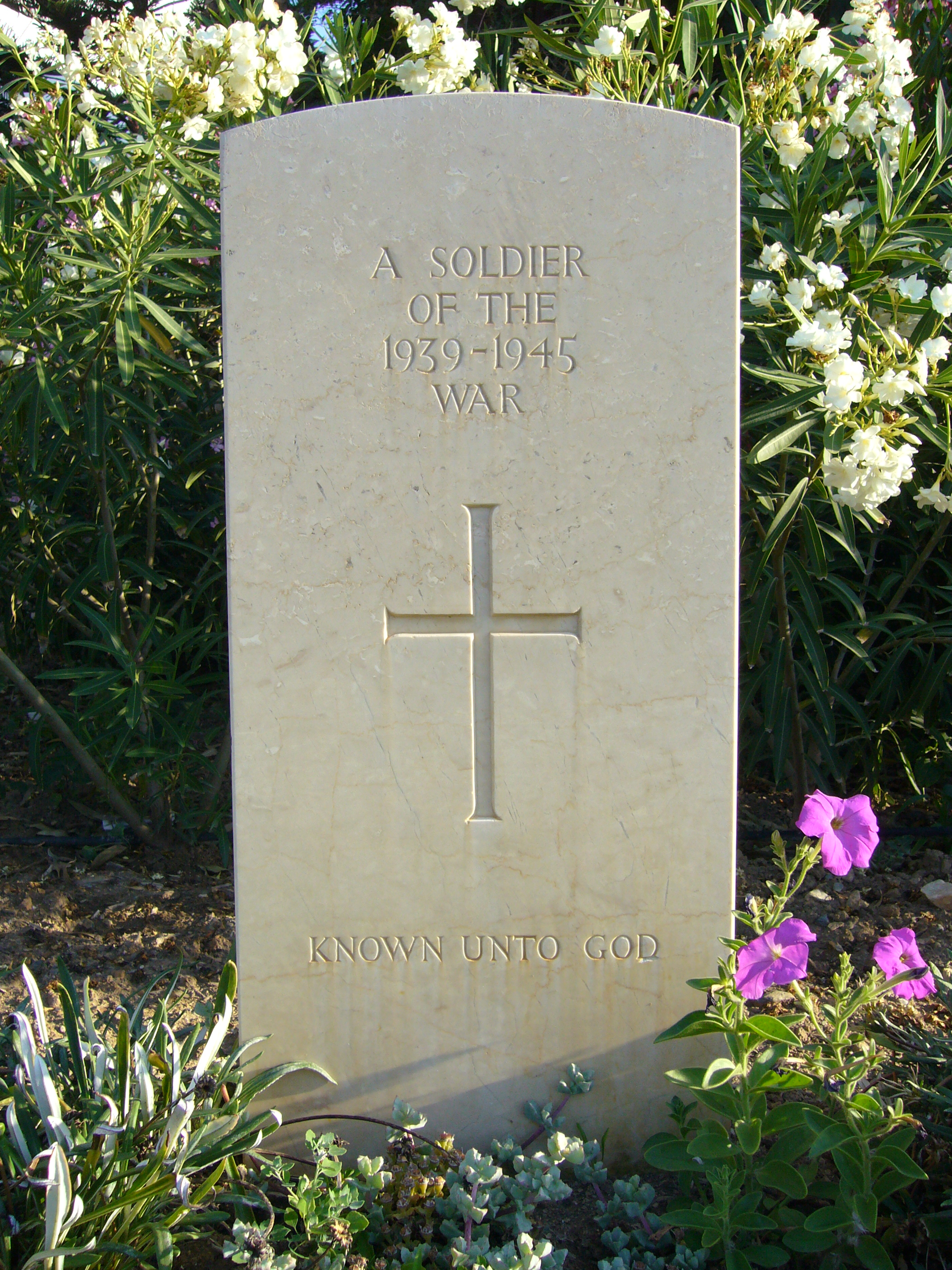
Grave of an unknown British combatant, killed in 1943 during the Battle of Leros

On the morning of 16 November it became apparent to the British commander, Brigadier Tilney, that his situation was untenable; at 17:30, when German forces had nearly reached his headquarters, he decided to surrender. Mascherpa surrendered at 22:00, after reiterated requests by the Germans and even by Tilney. Some Italian units, not informed of the surrender due to problems in communications, kept fighting until 17 November.

Overall, 3,200 British (201 officers and 3,000 soldiers) and 5,350 Italians (351 officers and 5,000 soldiers) were taken prisoner by the Germans. The 4th Bn, The Buffs, in their isolated position, were unaware of the surrender so did not attempt to escape; consequently nearly the whole unit was captured. As with the Buffs, only ninety men from the West Kents managed to escape from the island. The few Italian ships that were still serviceable left for Turkey or British-controlled ports. Some Italian officers were executed after the surrender; among them Cdr. Vittorio Meneghini, the commanding officer of Euro. On 17 November, 30 officers and 40 wounded prisoners were sent to Piraeus on board the destroyer TA15. On 21 November 2,700 prisoners, including Rear Admiral Mascherpa, were sent to Piraeus on board the steamer Schiaffino. On 7 December 3,000 Italian prisoners were transferred to Piraeus on board the ship Leda. Rear Admiral Mascherpa would be later handed over by the Germans to the Italian Social Republic; he was subjected to a kangaroo court for having defended Leros against the Germans, sentenced to death, and executed by firing squad.

== Aftermath ==
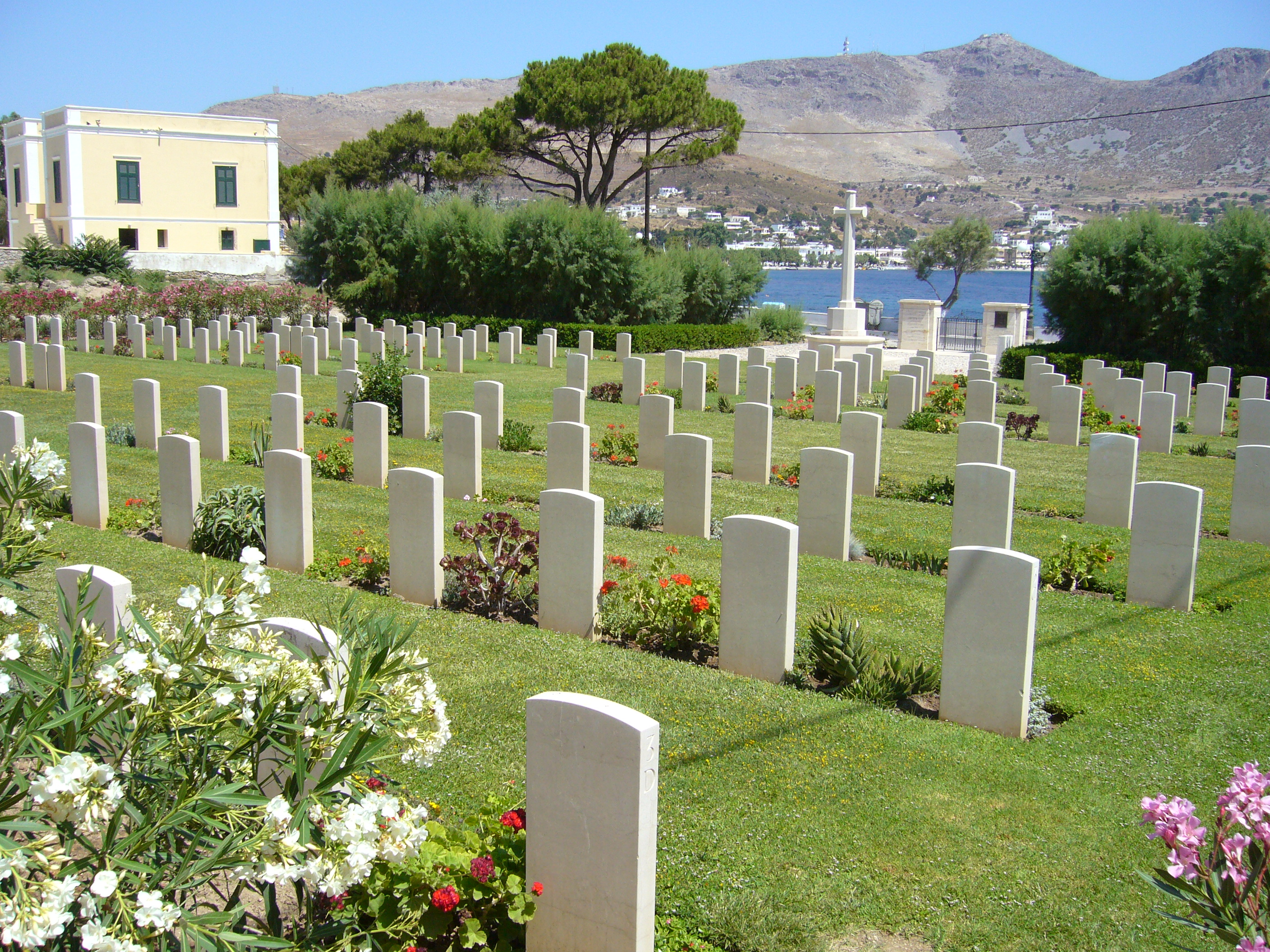
View from the rear of Leros CWGC cemetery

The withdrawal of air support, particularly that of fighters, sealed the fate of Leros. With no air support and under attack by the Luftwaffe, the three battalions had fought for five days until they were exhausted and could fight no more. The Commander-in-Chief (C-in-C) of Middle East Command, General Sir Henry Maitland Wilson, reported to the Prime Minister,

Leros has fallen, after a very gallant struggle against overwhelming air attack. It was a near thing between success and failure. Very little was needed to turn the scale in our favour and to bring off a triumph.

Everything was done to evacuate the garrisons of the other Aegean islands and to rescue survivors from Leros, and eventually an officer and fifty-seven other ranks of the 1st Battalion, King's Own Royal Regiment (Lancaster) rejoined the details in Palestine. Alan Brooke wrote that the COS meeting on 28 October,

discussed the desirability or otherwise of vacating Leros, A very nasty problem, Middle East (Command) have not been either wise or cunning and have now got themselves into the difficult situation that they can neither hold nor evacuate Leros. Our only hope would be assistance from Turkey, the provision of airfields from which the required air cover could be provided.

After the fall of Leros, Samos and the other smaller islands were abandoned. The Germans bombed Samos with Stukas, prompting the 2,500-strong Italian garrison to surrender on 22 November. Along with the occupation of the smaller islands of Patmos, Fournoi and Ikaria on 18 November, the Germans completed their re-conquest of the Dodecanese, that they held until the end of the war. The Battle of Leros was considered by some to be the last great defeat of the British Army in the Second World War and one of the last German victories. The German victory was due mostly to their gaining of air superiority, which caused great losses to the Allies, especially in ships and enabled the Germans to supply their forces. Tilney's scrapping of the original defensive plan, the work of Lieutenant-Colonel Maurice French, aided the Germans whose tactics, including scramble landings and an audacious air assault, further confused Tilney. The operation was criticised by many at the time as another useless "Gallipoli"-like disaster and Churchill was blamed.

=== Casualties ===
The Germans suffered casualties of 512 men killed or missing, the Italians, 300 killed or missing and the British suffered 600 killed or missing, of whom 187 died in the fighting on Leros, the rest being lost at sea. The Greek navy suffered the loss of 68 killed or missing and twenty civilians were killed.

== Order of battle ==
=== Leros artillery ===
Esercito Cobelligerante Italiano
| Name | No., Type | Place | Notes |
Leros garrison artillery
| Ducci | 4 × 152/50, 1 × 120/45 | Point 155 (Cazzuni) | 126 m (413 ft) |
| Ciano | 4 × 152/40 | Point 320 (Clidi) | |
| San Giorgio | 3 × 152/40, 1 × 102/35 | Point 334 (Mt. Scumbarda) | |
| Farinata | 4 × 120/45 | Point 256 (Marcello) | |
| Lago | 4 × 120/45 | Point 180 (Mt. Appetici) | |
Anti-aircraft guns
| PL 262 | 6 × 76/40 | Point 327 | |
| PL 248 | 6 × 76/40 | Mt. della Parma | |
| PL 113 | 4 × 76/40 | Point 226 (Zuncona) | |
Dual-purpose artillery
| PL 306 | 6 × 102/35, 2 × 76/40 | Mt. Vigla | (PL Italian: Pezzo Leggero, light artillery) |
| PL 388 | 4 × 102/35 | Porto Cassio | |
| PL 211 | 4 × 102/35 | Rachi | |
| PL 227 | 4 × 102/35 | Lakki Point | |
| PL 127 | 6 × 90/53 | Point 204 (Meraviglia) | |
| PL 281 | 6 × 76/40 | Point74 (Diapori Point) | |
| PL 899 | 4 × 76/50 | Point 48 (Vais Point) | |
| PL 906 | 4 × 76/40 | Point 284 (Muplogurna) | |
| PL 989 | 4 × 76/40 | Point 61 (Cape Timari) | |
| PL 888 | 4 × 76/40 | Point 61 (Blefuti Bay) | |
| PL 749 | 4 × 76/40 | Arcangelo (islet) | |
| PL 250 | 3 × 76/40 | Cazzuni Point | |
| PL 432 | 3 × 76/40 | Point 81 (La Madonna) | |
| PL 690 | 2 × 76/50 | Castello di Bronzi | |
| PL 508 | 2 × 76/50 | Point 138 — Kromydi | |
| PL 763 | 2 × 76/40 | Alinda Bay | |
| PL 763 | 2 × 76/40 | Gurna Bay | |

=== Submarine supply to Leros ===
Submarine voyages October−November 1943
| Name | Navy | Type | Tons | Notes |
|---|---|---|---|---|
| HMS Severn | Royal Navy | River-class submarine | 41.5 long tons (42.2 t) | 21–22 October |
| HMS Rorqual | Royal Navy | Grampus-class submarine | 50 long tons (51 t) | 23–24 October |
Marina Cobelligerante Italiana
| Zoea | Regia Marina | Foca-class submarine | 50 long tons (51 t) | 26–27 October |
| Filippo Corridoni | Regia Marina | Bragadin-class submarine | 45 long tons (46 t) | 29–30 October |
| Atropo | Regia Marina | Foca-class submarine | 43.5 long tons (44.2 t) | 30–31 October |
| Ciro Menotti | Regia Marina | Bandiera-class submarine | 49 long tons (50 t) | 31 October – 1 November |
| Zoea | Regia Marina | Foca-class submarine | 48.5 long tons (49.3 t) | 6–7 November |

== See also ==
- Military history of Greece during World War II
- Dodecanese Campaign
- Levant Schooner Flotilla
- Adriatic Campaign of World War II
- Axis occupation of Greece during World War II
- Mediterranean Theater of Operations

== Bibliography ==
- Brooke, Alan (2001). War Diaries 1939–1945. London: Phoenix Press. ISBN 978-1-84-212526-7.
- Brown, David (1995) [1990]. Warship Losses of World War Two (2nd pbk. ed.). London: Arms and Armour. ISBN 0-85409-278-1.
- dell'Uomo, Franco; Di Rosa, Roberto; Chiusano, Amedeo (2001). L'Esercito Italiano verso il 2000 (Tomo I). Vol. II. Roma: Italia Stato maggiore dell'esercito Ufficio storico. ISBN 978-8-88-794027-5.
- Jordan, Roger W. (2006) [1999]. The World's Merchant Fleets 1939: The Particulars and Wartime Fates of 6,000 Ships (2nd ed.). London: Chatham/Lionel Leventhal. ISBN 978-1-86176-293-1.
- Levi, Aldo (1993) [1957]. Avvenimenti in Egeo dopo l'armistizio (Rodi, Lero e isole minori) [Events in the Aegean Sea after the Armistice (Rhodes, Leros and Smaller Islands)]. Attività dopo l'armistizio; Marina italiana nella Seconda Guerra Mondiale (tome 2) (in Italian). Vol. XVI. Roma: Ufficio storico della Marina Militare. OCLC 256470111.
- Pagano, Gian Paolo; Notarangelo, R., eds. (1997) [1952]. Navi mercantili perdute [Merchant Ship Losses]. La Marina italiana nella seconda guerra mondiale. Vol. III (3rd ed.). Roma: Ufficio Storico della Marina Militare. OCLC 315316962.
- Petacco, Arrigo (2014). La nostra guerra: 1940–1945 : l'Italia al fronte tra bugie e verità [Our War: 1940–1945: Italy on the Front between Lies and Truth] (in Italian). Torino: UTET. ISBN 978-8-85-205783-0.
- Rogers, Anthony (2003). Churchill's Folly: Leros and the Aegean — The Last Great British Defeat of World War II. London: Cassell. ISBN 978-0-304-36151-9.
- Searle, G. W. (1994). At Sea Level. Lewes: Book Guild. ISBN 978-0-86-332897-8.
- Smith, Peter; Walker, Edwin (2008) [1974]. War in the Aegean: The Campaign for the Eastern Mediterranean in WWII. Stackpole Military History. Mechanicsburg, PA: Stackpole Books. ISBN 978-0-8117-3519-3.
