= Dodecanese campaign =

Campaign of the Mediterranean theatre of World War II

- Part of the Mediterranean and Middle East theatre of World War II
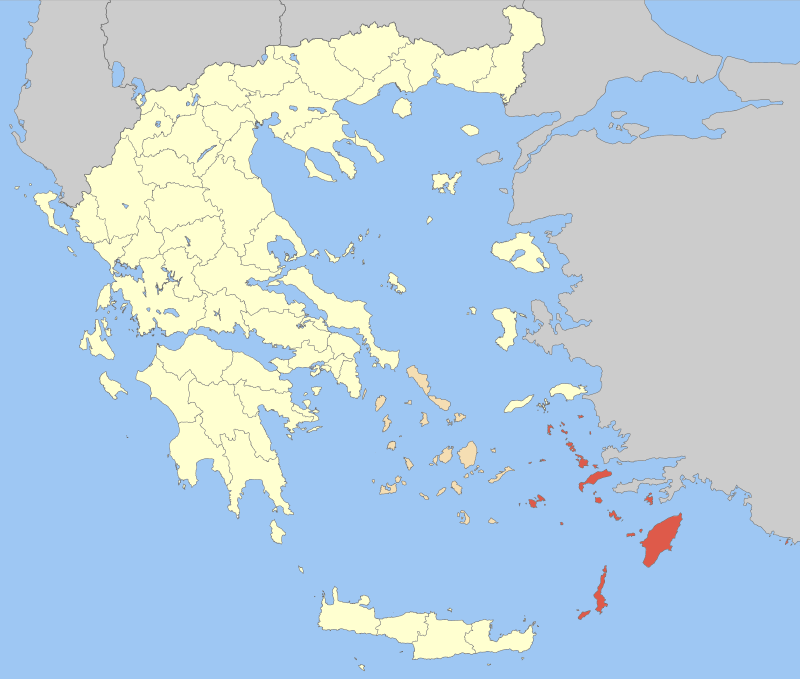
- Location of the Dodecanese islands (in red)
Date	8 September – 22 November 1943
Location	Dodecanese
Result	German victory
Territorial changes	German occupation of the Dodecanese

Belligerents
Germany	(Kingdom of Italy) Italy; United Kingdom; Naval support: Greece; Poland; South Africa; Air support: United States

Commanders and leaders
(Nazi Germany) Friedrich-Wilhelm Müller; (Nazi Germany) Ulrich Kleemann	(Kingdom of Italy) Inigo Campioni; (Kingdom of Italy) Luigi Mascherpa; (Kingdom of Italy) Felice Leggio; (United Kingdom) Robert Tilney; (United Kingdom) Lionel Kenyon

Strength
Rhodes: 7,000–9,500 troops; smaller garrisons on other islands; Fliegerkorps X	Italy: 55,000; Britain: 5,300

Casualties and losses
1,184 killed, wounded and missing; 15 landing craft destroyed	Italy: 5,350 killed and wounded; 44,391 captured; 1 destroyer sunk; 10 minesweepers, coastal defence ships sunk; Britain: 4,800 killed, wounded, captured and missing; 115 aircraft destroyed; 4 destroyers sunk; 2 submarines sunk; Greece: 1 destroyer sunk; 1 submarine sunk

The Dodecanese campaign (8 September – 22 November 1943) was the capture and occupation of the Dodecanese islands by German forces during the Second World War. Following the signing of the Armistice of Cassibile on 3 September 1943, Italy joined the Allies. The Germans implemented contingency plans to seize control of the Dodecanese, which were under Italian control. The Allies planned to use the islands as bases to strike against German targets in the Balkans, which the Germans aimed to forestall.

Beginning in early September 1943, German troops defeated the Italian garrison in the Dodecanese and British forces sent to join them, aided by the fact that Allied units were operating without sufficient air cover. Most of the Dodecanese islands fell to German forces within two months, resulting in one of Germany's last victories of the war. The German occupation of the Dodecanese islands continued until the end of the war in 1945, when they surrendered to British forces.

== Background ==
=== Dodecanese Archipelago ===
The Aegean Sea is part of the Mediterranean from Greece to the western coast of Turkey. The Sporades are in the north, the Cyclades in the south and the twelve islands of the Dodecanese are in the south-eastern Aegean, most close to the Turkish shore and usually grouped with Rhodes and Kastellorizo. (Note: Most of the Dodecanese Archipelao, comprising Nisyros, Kos, Kasos, Patmos, Halki, Leros, Tilos, Symi, Stampalia, Lipsos, Scarpanto and Kalymnos is within sight of the Turkish shore.) The islands had been under Italian control since the Italo-Turkish War in 1911. During Italian rule, the islands became a focus of Italian colonial ambitions in the Eastern Mediterranean. Rhodes, the largest of the islands, was a military and air base. The island of Leros, with its excellent deep-water port of Portolago (now Lakki) was developed into a fortified air base, "the Corregidor of the Mediterranean" (Benito Mussolini) but these developments were mostly a bluff to deter the Greeks from attacking the archipelago and a latent threat to Greece and Turkey. As Italian colonial ambitions developed in the 1930s, the naval and air bases on the islands became a military threat to the Egyptian coast. The Italians made little use of the islands during the war and their supply became a liability. A British attempt to contest Italian control of the Dodecanese, Operation Abstention (25–28 February 1941) was thwarted, when Italian forces recaptured Kastellorizo from the Royal Marines and No. 50 Commando.

=== Kos ===
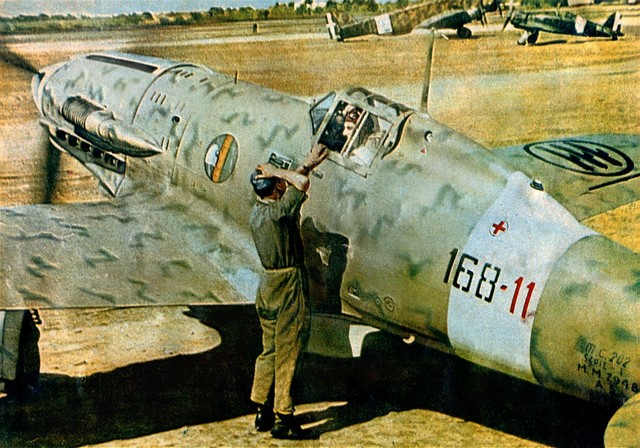
Example of a Macchi C.202 fighter

Kos is an island that is 26.5 mi (42.6 km) long and 1 to 6.3 mi (1.6 to 10.1 km) wide. The south coast of the island is steep and hills run from Cape Foca in the east, westwards to Pili and further on; Mt. Dicheo is the highest hill at 2,776 ft (846 m), the hills declining in height towards the west end of the island. The steep southern slopes are rocky and the northern slopes, less steep, descend to pine forests and farmland. There are many sandy beaches and large salt flats at Lambi and Tingachi (now Tigaki). Kos town and port is at the east end of the island and a road runs from the town to Cefalo (now Kefalos) in the west. In September 1943, the c. 3,500 Italian infantry of the 10th Regiment, 50th Infantry Division Regina had four coastal guns, a few obsolescent anti-aircraft guns and its infantry was spread around the island, with little anti-aircraft protection. No defences had been dug, the sites of the four coastal guns were well chosen but the guns were old, in the open and lacked fire-control.

The Regia Aeronautica had detached the 396° Squadriglia, 154 Gruppo CT, to Kos in 1943; in September the Squadriglia had eight fighters, of which four were serviceable, two C.202s a CR.42 and a G.50, with two pilots between them. The island had plenty of food for the 20,000 Greek civilian inhabitants, the Italian and British troops and water was easily available in the towns and villages but lacking in the hinterland. Kos town had a sheltered harbour but the water was shallow, it lacked equipment and had only one berth. One of the Italian pilots took off in the CR.42 on 10 September and flew to Rhodes. Later that evening the remaining pilot spotted six Heinkel He 111 bombers and claimed one shot down. On 11 September, two German aircraft attacked Antimachia, destroyed two aircraft and damaged one.

=== Leros ===
Leros is at the northern end of the Dodecanese, with Kalymnos to the south. The island is about 9 mi (14 km) long and varies from .65 to 4 mi (1.05 to 6.44 km) wide with islets off the coast. The island is rocky with narrow valleys and hills, the highest being Mt Scumbarda at the south end at 1,096 ft (334 m). The coast is indented and has steep cliffs with several sandy beaches in the centre of the island in Grifo, Alinda and Gurna bays. The capital is Leros (now Platanos) is in a narrow valley in the north-central part of the island, with the Appetici promontory (590 ft (180 m) to the north and Meraviglia to the south at 669 ft (204 m). There is a road from Leros town to the main port of Portolago (now Lakki) with side-roads to Italian gun-positions on the high ground. The Italian colonial forces were comfortably housed and the Greek inhabitants farmed terraces on the slopes of the hills, herded goats and fished.

=== Unternehmen Achse ===
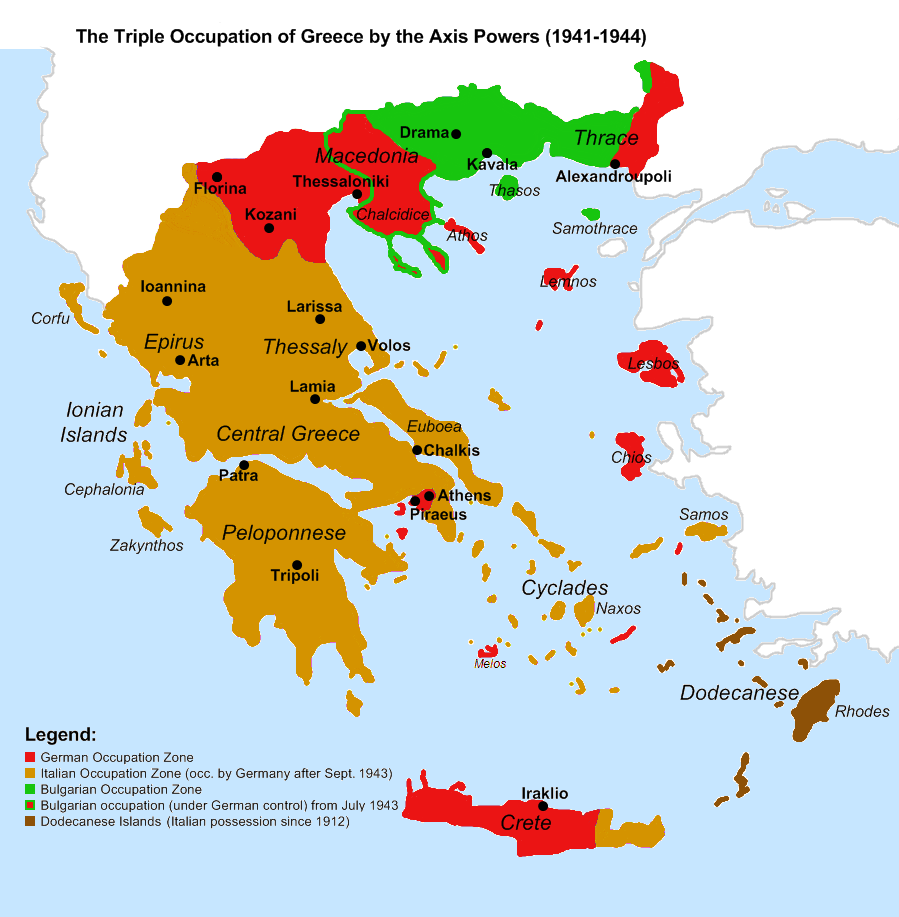
The three zones of the Axis occupation of Greece, 1941−1944.

By May 1943, Adolf Hitler had begun to contemplate the possibility of Italian defection from the Axis. The high command of the German armed forces, Oberkommando der Wehrmacht (OKW) prepared an assessment of the situation if Italy made a separate peace and planned the reinforcement of German troops in Italy (Unternehmen Alaric) and the Balkans (Unternehmen Constantine) that were combined into Unternehmen Achse (Operation Axis) after the overthrow of Mussolini and the Allied invasion of Sicily, the orders being promulgated from 28 to 30 July. On the announcement of the Armistice of Cassibile (3 September 1943) announced on 8 September, the operation began with a week's notice. Italian troops were to be disarmed and made to choose between disbandment and fighting on with the Germans.

Transport infrastructure such as the passes in the Apennines, railways, ports and the ships of the Regia Marina, merchant ships, aircraft and airfields of the Regia Aeronautica, military bases and equipment were to be taken under German military control. The German army in the Mediterranean was reinforced to 38 divisions and a new Army Group F (Field Marshal Maximilian von Weichs) created in the Balkans, with the former commander in chief, Generaloberst Alexander Löhr, taking over the subordinate Army Group E in Greece and the Aegean. The 22nd Air Landing Division was occupying most of Crete and Sturm Division Rhodos (Assault Division Rhodes, Generalleutnant (Lieutenant-General) Ulrich Kleemann) had been built up on the island of Rhodes since January 1943.

=== Allied strategy ===
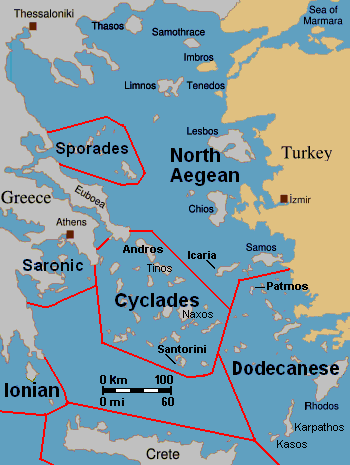
Archipelagos the Aegean, the Cyclades, Dodecanese and North Aegean Islands (the Ionian Sea is west of Greece)

The British Prime Minister Winston Churchill had desired to draw Turkey into the war since 1940, because Turkish adherence to the Allies would turn the Axis flank in Greece and the Balkans that would be another drain on German military resources, cut the German Black Sea route into the Eastern Mediterranean, threaten German Balkan allies and open another supply route to the USSR. Airfields on Turkey would be able to contribute to the strategic bombing campaign, particularly the Romanian oil industry. The Russians thought that if Turkey entered the war, the Germans would divert a minimum of ten divisions. Despite British blandishments, the Turkish government was unmoved: defeat would lead to German occupation and victory would benefit the USSR.

The Americans were not enthused at the prospect of being saddled with the responsibility of equipping the 46 divisions of the Turkish army, along with all the other armies being supplied by Lend-Lease. There was no optimism at the Casablanca Conference (14−24 January 1943) and First Quebec Conference (17–24 August 1943) for a forward policy in the Aegean. Despite the American lack of enthusiasm, Churchill thought that the defection of Italy on 8 September and the collapse of the Axis position in the Mediterranean made an Aegean strategy feasible: "This is the time to play high."

=== Operation Accolade ===
In the spring of 1943, plans began to be laid for offensive action in the Aegean. The British had wanted to gain control of the Aegean since Italy joined in the war but until autumn 1943 the means for such a policy had been lacking. General Dwight D. Eisenhower had been given first call on resources at the Third Washington Conference (12−25 May 1943) except for seven divisions due to be sent to Britain and two British divisions ready to support Turkey against an Axis attack. Naval forces were distributed around the world and the Mediterranean Air Command had been reinforced for the Allied invasion of Sicily (9 July – 17 August 1943) only. General Henry Maitland Wilson, the Commander in Chief Middle East Land Forces, had no power to divert troops from Sicily or Italy and permanent uncertainty over the forces at his disposal for an Aegean enterprise. A directive issued to Wilson on 12 February 1943 required him to prepare for operations in the eastern Mediterranean and No. 2 Planning Staff (later Force 292) Lieutenant-General Sir Desmond Anderson, Air Vice-Marshal Richard Saul and Rear-Admiral Geoffrey Miles began to draft plans. (Note: Anderson was the commander of III Corps in Iran and Iraq, Saul was AOC AHQ Air Defences Eastern Mediterranean and Miles was deputed from the Commander-in-Chief, Levant.)

Rhodes was the principal object of the Planning Staff, along with Scarpanto (now Karpathos) and then islands further north, to open the route to Smyrna (now İzmir). (Note: The name for the Rhodes scheme was Operation Handcuff but Accolade became the usual term.) By late July three plans for Accolade were ready: a promenade to Rhodes if the Italians collapsed and the Germans withdrew, a quick exploitation if the Italians gave in but the Germans remained and a methodical invasion should the Italians and Germans be prepared to defend the Island. A planning assumption was that Eisenhower would not use all the forces at his disposal and would lend naval and air forces, possibly troops, but this created permanent uncertainty for the planners, whose plans were difficult to devise due to the distance of the Dodecanese from Egypt and the airfields available to the Luftwaffe at Scarpanto [45 mi (72 km) from Rhodes], Crete [160 mi (260 km)] and southern Greece [270 mi (430 km)]. The distance from Alexandria to Kos via the strait between Rhodes and Karpathos is 370 nmi (690 km; 430 mi) and between Rhodes and the Turkish mainland is 400 nmi (740 km; 460 mi). Kos to Leros is 30 mi (48 km) and Leros to Samos is 40 mi (64 km).

The nearest RAF bases to Rhodes were in Cyprus, about 270 mi (430 km) away and Gambut, about 350 mi (560 km) distant as the war had receded from Egypt after the Second Battle of El Alamein in 1942. The Allied air forces had been concentrated in the central Mediterranean for the Sicilian and Italian campaigns. Allied single-engined fighters had nothing like the range to operate over such distances and it would be necessary to operate them from the Turkish mainland or to develop airfields on Kos sufficient for four fighter squadrons. Twin-engined fighters like the Beaufighter operating from Cyprus or Gambut were no substitute against Messerschmitt Bf 109s and the small number of Lightnings in the Mediterranean offered no prospect of success, despite its superior performance. During planning, it was assumed that only single-engined fighters could protect assault landings and that this ruled out Accolade. In August, Allied operations in Italy allowed the hope that German resources had been withdrawn from the Aegean, that Eisenhower could spare heavy bombers to attack Luftwaffe airfields in Greece and Crete and lend four Lightning squadrons.

On 25 July, Mussolini fell and two days later, Churchill prodded the Chiefs of Staff Committee to keep Accolade in mind and on 1 August, Wilson signalled that the minimum of shipping needed for Accolade was an HQ ship, eight Landing ship, infantry (large) [LSI (l)] or Landing Ship Personnel and eighteen MT ships. There were eight LSI (l) in Egypt but five were due to sail to India and the committee signalled on 2 August that most of the air and sea forces would have to come from the central Mediterranean. Wilson was told to take an opportunistic policy in the Aegean. The ship voyages to India were cancelled and some supplies for Turkey were stopped and the staff was told to beg and borrow from Eisenhower eight ships and landing craft, four Lightning squadrons, a parachute battalion and its aircraft and smaller units of specialists by 14–15 August. The British would have a brigade ready by 18 August and another by 22 August. Eisenhower agreed but later than hoped and less the Lightnings or transport aircraft but on 12 August had second thoughts lest Accolade divert resources from Operation Avalanche, the landings at Salerno, due on 9 September and urged the postponement of Accolade. By the end of August anything more ambitious than an unopposed landing on Rhodes or Crete was impossible using only British resources but by 7 September several small operations had been planned to begin with the announcement of the armistice.

== Prelude ==
=== British initiatives ===
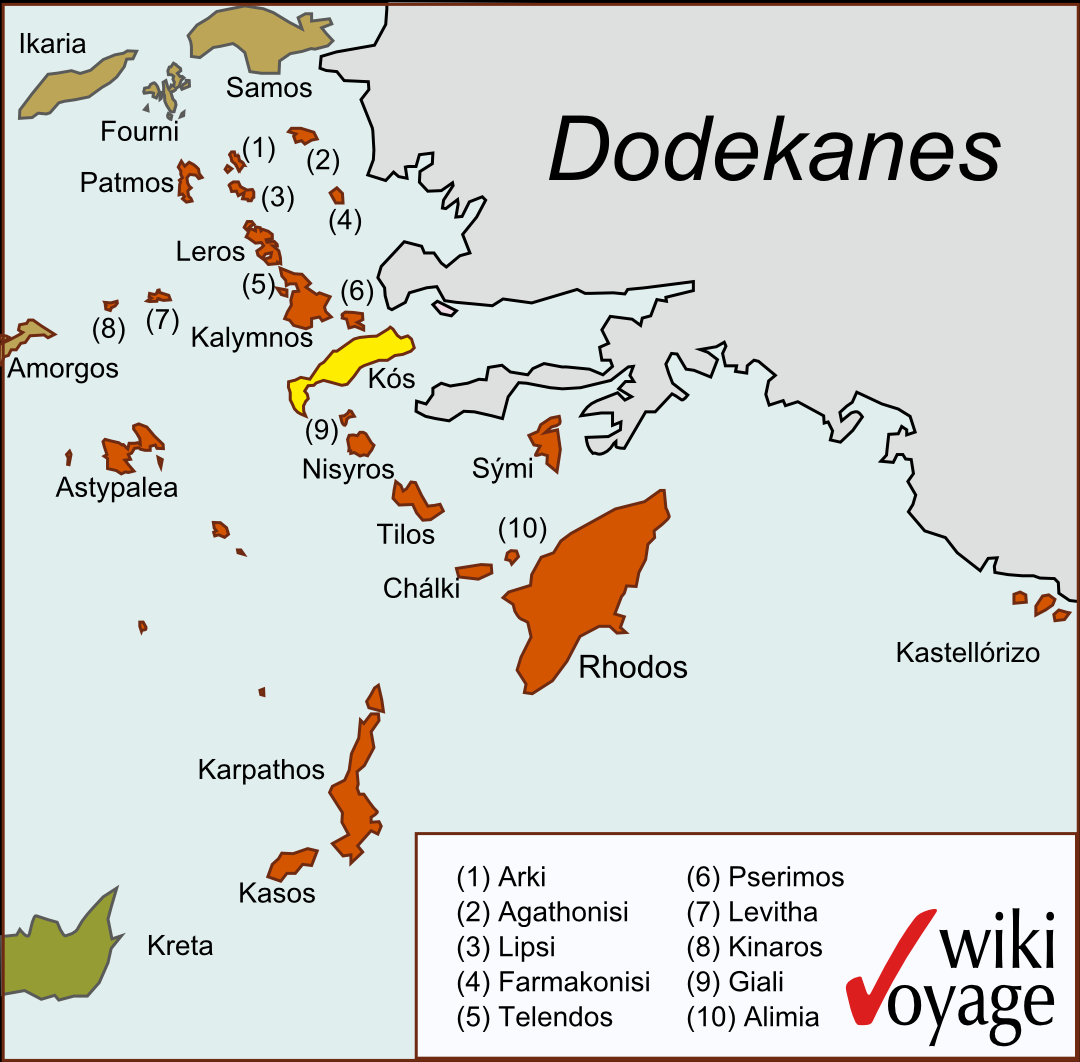
Dodecanese Archipelago, Kos in yellow

After the disappointments over American support, the British prepared small operations. A detachment of the Special Air Service was to go to Kastellorizo, close to Turkey and about 80 mi (130 km) east of Rhodes to rally the Italian garrison and establish a base for small craft. Other groups were to go further afield, Kos in particular because it had an airfield and room for more, as did Scarpanto (now Karpathos). A mission was to go to Rhodes to contact Major General Michele Scaroina and Admiral Inigo Campioni and see if they would begin hostilities against the German garrison. (Note: Head of the mission was Lieutenant-Colonel D. J. T. Turnbull, Major John Jellicoe along with five naval and air officers, an interpreter and a signaller.) If the mission succeeded, the 234th Infantry Brigade (Major-General Francis Brittorous) and tanks would sail to Rhodes in three merchant ships, that were available but not built for assault loading and would need the harbour to unload. Despite Turnbull flying to Rhodes and Jellicoe and a companion parachuting on 9/10 September, Kleemann arrested Scaroina and attacked the Italian garrison. When Campioni was told that British troops could not arrive before 15 September, he ordered the Italians to surrender on 11 September.

Despite being forestalled on Rhodes, the British decided to occupy Kos, 60 mi (97 km) north-west of Rhodes and use the airfield at Antimachia and to take Leros, another 35 mi (56 km) to the north-west of Kos. Leros had a good anchorage and some port facilities but no airfield. Samos, 40 mi (64 km) further on than Leros, separated from Turkey by a narrow channel and on the route to Smyrna (İzmir) was also to be occupied and the islands would be bases for a "piratical war on enemy communications in the Aegean". Parties were to land on other islands to reconnoitre, encourage Italian garrisons to side with the Allies and to resist German pressure. Domination of the Dodecanese would need Rhodes that was to be taken and on 1 October plans to capture Rhodes were accepted, using the part-assembled 8th Indian Infantry Division and the 9th Armoured Brigade. Eisenhower had offered four warships, three LSI and transport aircraft, any more being found by the British. Intelligence revealed that the Luftwaffe in the Aegean was being reinforced and that to hold Kos, these aircraft must be destroyed, as short-range fighters needed the airfield at Antimachia.

=== British occupation of Kos, 12–17 September ===
==== 12−14 September ====
On 12 September a Special Boat Service (SBS) detachment of 55 men (Major David Sutherland) sailed for Kos from Kastellorizo in a motley of craft and RN motor launches as 38 US bombers of the IX Bomber Command attacked the airfields on Kalymnos island and Maritza airfield on Rhodes. The SBS arrived on 14 September and contacted the Italian commander who wanted to cooperate. The SBS party moved to Antimachia about 13 mi (21 km) from Kos town. At 6:40 a.m. on 14 September, a Beaufighter delivered an RAF wireless party to Antimachia airfield, as another circled overhead and at dusk Six Spitfire Mk Vs of 7 Squadron SAAF arrived from Cyprus, with the rest preparing to transfer and ground crews being delivered by three Dakotas of 216 Squadron escorted by six Beaufighters of 46 Squadron despite being fired on by Italian anti-aircraft guns in error.

On the night of 14/15 September, seven Dakotas flew from RAF Mafraq in Jordan to Nicosia to transport 120 paratroops, a mortar section and a machine-gun section of A Company, 11th Battalion, the Parachute Regiment and a headquarters group to Kos that night, the SBS marking the drop zone and Italian troops spreading straw and hay on the ground. As soon as they landed, the paratroops joined the Italians in preparing defences most exposed to seaborne landings but the coast was 80 mi (130 km) long and with the numbers available, keeping watch would be difficult. The main defensive effort was to be made around Antimachia airfield and another site for an airstrip was chosen at Lambia, north of Kos town.

==== 15 September ====
On the morning of 15 September, 216 Squadron Dakotas flew a party of 42 men from 2909 Squadron Royal Air Force Regiment flew from RAF Ramat David in Palestine to Antimachia, with nine 20 mm Hispano anti-aircraft guns but the stony ground was impossible to dig in and it was slow work building blast walls. Two Spitfires at a time kept a standing patrol and another two were on instant readiness but no Luftwaffe aircraft intervened. The SBS was relieved and departed for Samos and another SBS party arrived and moved to Simi. The commander of Force 292, Lieutenant-General Desmond Anderson, arrived during the morning, carried out an inspection then left for the other islands..

==== 16 September ====
At dawn on 16 September, a German Junkers Ju 88 bomber from 2.(F)/123 appeared over Kos, bombed Italian coastal artillery, then bombed Antimachia. The Hispano gunners damaged it and as it flew out to sea and the standing patrol chased it towards Rhodes, shooting it down near the island. The British redeployed the Hispanos and the DLI filled in the craters. Later in the morning, C Company of the 1st Battalion, Durham Light Infantry (DLI, Lieutenant-Colonel R. F. Kirby) arrived by air and took post around the airfield. The 4th Light Anti-Aircraft Battery, 1st Light Anti-Aircraft Regiment RA also arrived by air but its 40 mm Bofors guns were being transported by sea. Parties of the 9th Indian Field Company RE and a medical unit arrived by caïque, Motor Launch and destroyer. The rest of the DLI were delivered by air (the 11th Parachute Battalion withdrew on 25 September).

==== 17 September ====
Another party of 58 men of 2909 Squadron, RAF Regiment arrived on 17 September with seven 20 mm Hispano cannon, five being sent to Kos town. An Italian observation post reported seven Junkers Ju 52 transport aircraft with two Bf 109 fighter escorts. The standing patrol saw several formations of Luftwaffe aircraft and that this formation was of nine Ju 52s and attacked as they flew over Stampalia (now Astypalaia) at 300 ft (91 m). One Spitfire pilot claimed a Ju 52 shot down before returning damaged, escorted by the other Spitfire.

=== Occupation of Leros ===
From mid-September to early November 1943, Middle East Command sent to Leros the headquarters of the 234th Infantry Brigade (Brigadier F. G. R. Brittorous) and on 17 September, A Company and B Company, the 2nd Battalion, Royal Irish Fusiliers, a communications party, base staff and stores arrived at Leros on the destroyers HMS Croome and Hurworth. The British found the port operational, with the Italians sympathetic, despite low morale and poor organisation. The commander of Force 292, Lieutenant-General Desmond Anderson visited on 15 September. Liaison parties went to Samos.

== Battles ==
=== Rhodes ===
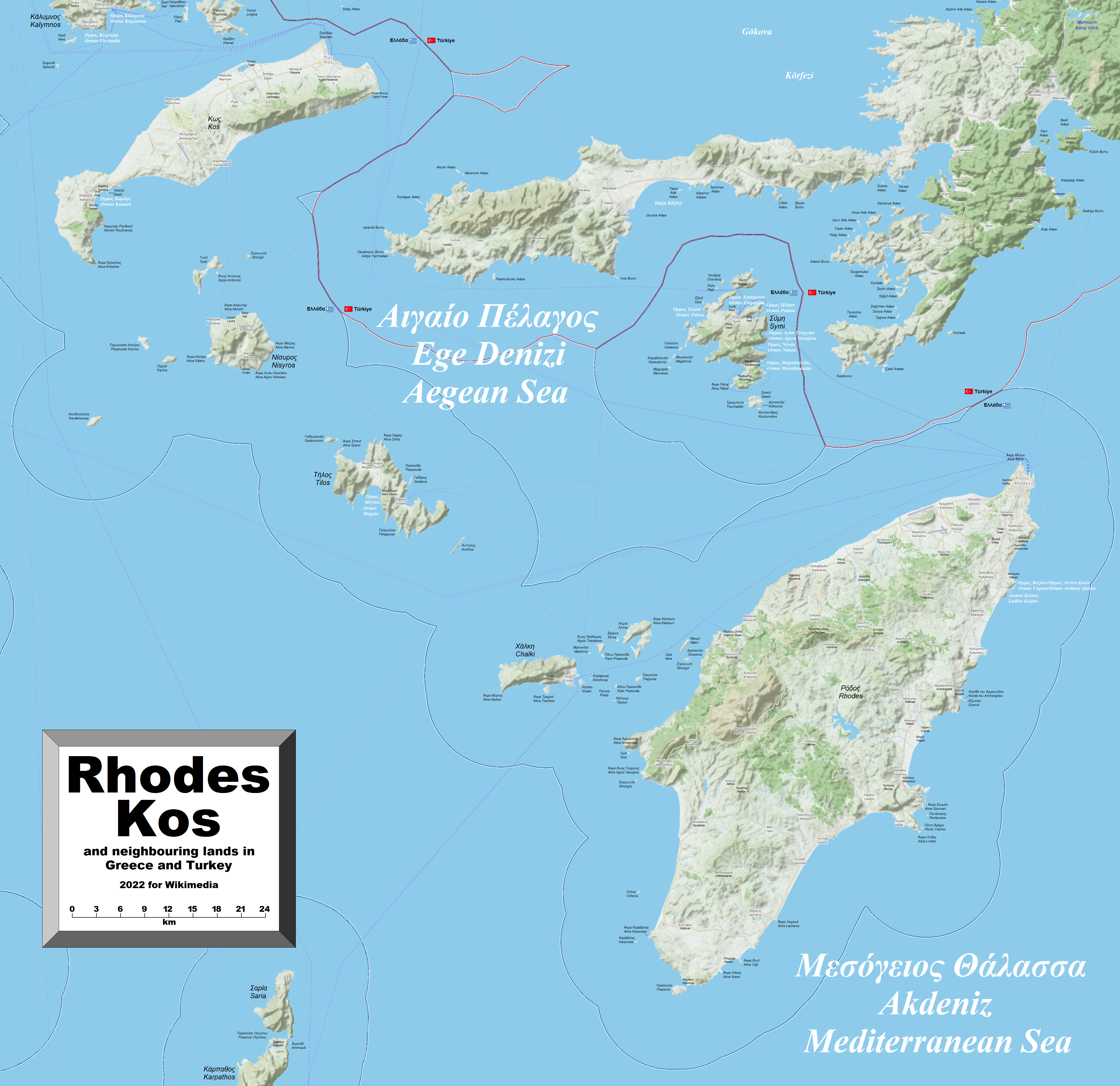
Map of Rhodes, Kos and environs

Sturm-Division Rhodos, a well-armed, mobile force of 6,000–7,000 men, had evolved into the principal German force in the Dodecanese with another 1,500 German troops on the island of Scarpanto (now Karpathos) to the west of Rhodes. The island was the administrative centre of the Dodecanese Islands that had three military airfields. Because of its size and geographical position, Rhodes was the principal military objective for both sides. On 8 September 1943, the Italian garrison on the island of Kastelorizo surrendered to a British detachment, that was reinforced during the following days by ships of the Allied navies.

On 9 September, a British delegation, led by George Jellicoe, parachuted onto Rhodes, to persuade the Italian commander, Ammiraglio Inigo Campioni, to join the Allies. Kleemann attacked the 40,000-strong Italian garrison on 9 September and forced it to surrender by 11 September. The loss of Rhodes was a serious blow to Allied hopes. By 19 September, Karpathos, Kasos and the Italian-occupied islands of the Sporades and the Cyclades were in German hands. On 23 September, the 22nd Infantry Division (Generalleutnant Friedrich-Wilhelm Müller), that garrisoned Fortress Crete, was ordered to take Kos and Leros.

=== Kos ===
Having identified the vital role of Kos that had the only Allied landing grounds, Fliegerkorps X bombed it and Allied positions, from 18 September. Reinforcements gave the Germans 362 operational aircraft in the Aegean by 1 October. The British forces on Kos numbered about 1,500 men, 680 of whom were infantry, the rest being mainly RAF personnel and c. 3,500 Italians of the 10th Regiment, 50th Infantry Division Regina. On 3 October, the Germans made amphibious and airborne landings with the code-name Unternehmen Eisbär (Operation Polar Bear) and reached the outskirts of Kos town later that day. The British withdrew under cover of night and surrendered the next day. The fall of Kos was disastrous to the Allies, since it deprived them of air cover. The Germans captured 1,388 British and 3,145 Italian prisoners. On 4 October, German troops committed the Massacre of Kos, killing the captured Italian commander of the island, Colonnello Felice Leggio, and nearly 100 of his officers.

=== Leros ===
The Allied garrison of Leros consisted of most of the 234th Infantry Brigade with c. 3,000 men of the 2nd The Royal Irish Fusiliers (Lieutenant Colonel Maurice French), the 4th The Buffs (The Royal East Kent Regiment), 1st The King's Own Royal Regiment (Lancaster) and the 2nd Company, 2nd Queen's Own Royal West Kent Regiment. Brigadier Robert Tilney assumed command on 5 November. There were also c. 8,500 Italians, mostly naval personnel, under Ammiraglio Luigi Mascherpa.

After the fall of Kos, the Italian garrison of Kalymnos surrendered, providing the Germans with a base for operations against Leros. Unternehmen Leopard (Operation Leopard) was originally scheduled for 9 October but on 7 October, the Royal Navy intercepted and destroyed the German convoy headed for Kos. Several hundred men and most of the few German heavy landing craft were lost; replacements were transported by rail and it was not until 5 November that the Germans had assembled a fleet of 24 light infantry landing craft. To avoid interception by the Allied navies, they were dispersed among several Aegean islands and camouflaged. Despite Allied efforts to locate and sink the invasion fleet, as well as bombardments of the ports of German-held islands, the Germans suffered few losses and were able to assemble their invasion force, under Generalleutnant Müller, for Unternehmen Taifun (Operation Typhoon) on 12 November.

The German invasion force consisted of personnel from all branches of the Wehrmacht, including veterans from the 22nd Infantry Division, a Fallschirmjäger (paratroop) battalion and an amphibious operations company Küstenjäger (Coast Raiders) from the Brandenburger special operation unit. The Luftwaffe began an air offensive against Leros on 26 September which caused significant casualties and damage to the garrison and supporting naval forces. In the early hours of 12 November, the invasion force in two groups approached the island from east and west. Despite failures in some areas, the Germans established a bridgehead and airborne forces landed on Mt Rachi, in the middle of the island. After repulsing Allied counter-attacks and being reinforced the following night, the Germans quickly cut the island in two and the Allies surrendered on 16 November. The Germans suffered 520 casualties and captured 3,200 British and 5,350 Italian soldiers.

=== Samos and lesser islands ===
After the fall of Leros, Samos and the other smaller islands were evacuated. German Ju 87 (Stukas) of I Gruppe, Stukageschwader 3 bombed Samos on 17 November and the British were withdrawn on the night of 19/20 November and the 2,500-strong Italian garrison surrendered on 22 November. Along with the occupation of the smaller islands of Patmos, Fournoi and Ikaria on 18 November, the Germans completed their conquest of the Dodecanese, which they held until the end of the war. Only the island of Kastellorizo, south-east of Rhodes, off the Turkish coast, was retained by the British after most of the garrison was taken off on 28 November.

== Maritime operations ==
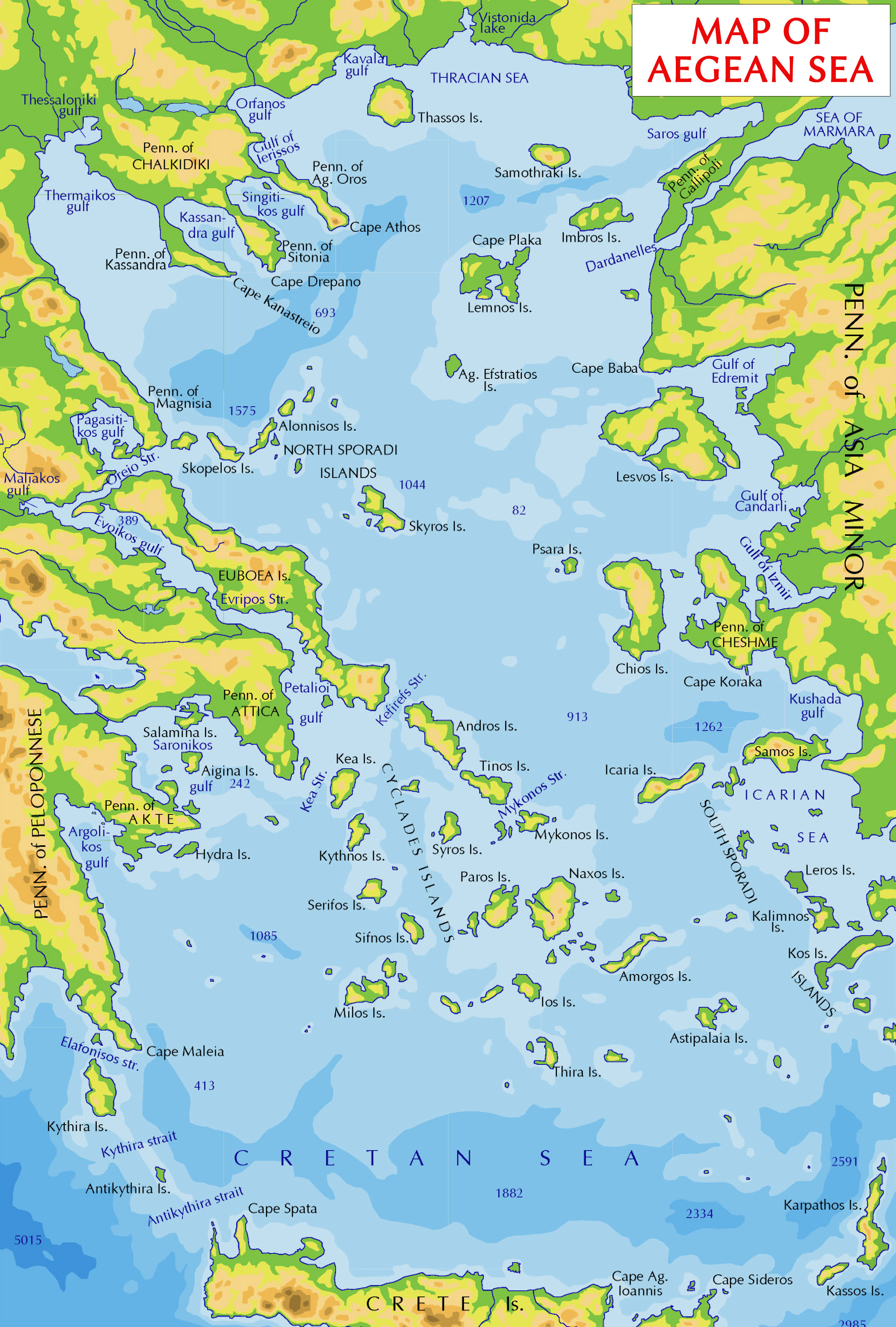
The Aegean Sea

The large number of islands in the Aegean Sea forced the Allies and Germans to rely on naval vessels for reinforcements and supplies. At first the naval effort by both sides was small, most of the Allied shipping and warships had been transferred to the central Mediterranean for the invasion of Italy, while the Germans did not have a large naval force in the Aegean. Vice-Admiral Werner Lange, the German Naval Commander-in-Chief of the Aegean, tried to reinforce German garrisons and carry out offensive operations against Allied garrisons and transport Italian prisoners of war to the mainland.

On 14 September, the Greek submarine Katsonis, was rammed and sunk by the Anti-submarine warfare (ASW) vessel UJ 2101. On 16 September, eight Beaufighter VIs of 227 Squadron and 252 Squadron (acting as fighters) from Cyprus, found a German convoy south-west of Naxos with two merchant ships, the escort UJ 2104 and three Arado Ar 196 floatplanes of 1./Seeaufklärungsgruppe 126 (SAGr 126). One of the Arados was forced down and the crew rescued by the escort. The ships were bombed and strafed against considerable return-fire. The smaller ship was near-missed, sank quickly and the Beaufighters returned, three having been damaged and crash-landing at their base. The 8th Destroyer Flotilla with its longer-ranged fleet destroyers, HMS Echo, HMS Eclipse, HMS Faulknor, HMS Intrepid, HMS Raider and the Greek Vasilissa Olga, arrived at Alexandria from the central Mediterranean to reinforce the ships operating in the Aegean.

On 17 September Eclipse, Faulknor and the Greek Vasilissa Olga departed Alexandria at 8:00 a.m. to sweep between Rhodes and Stampalia (Astypalaia). At 7:30 p.m. the flotilla received a reconnaissance aircraft report of a convoy of the merchant ships Paula (3,754 GRT) and Pluto (1,156 GRT) from Piraeus bound for Rhodes. The destroyers planned to attack the ships between Astypalaia and Kandeliusa near Kos. At 0:17 a.m. the merchant ships and their escort, UJ2104 (Darvik) were spotted and the flotilla manoeuvred to silhouette the ships against the moon. At 0:39 a.m. the destroyers opened fire at 2,000 yd (1,800 m), Eclipse and Faulknor engaged Paula and Faulknor hit the target with its first salvo and after the third salvo, changed target to UJ 2104 hitting it at once. Vasilissa Olga engaged Pluto and both merchant ships caught fire, Faulknor sank Paula by torpedo and Paula exploded soon afterwards. The destroyers raced south at 29 kn (54 km/h; 33 mph) for the Scarpanto (now (Karpathos) Strait, got beyond the range of Luftwaffe bombers by dawn and returned to port at Haifa. (Note: UJ 2104, the former British whaler Kos, was found beached off Stampalia (Karpathos) and the crew was taken to Alexandria. They said that the ships were intended to remove 6,000 Italians from Rhodes and were carrying technicians and supplies when sunk.)

On 19 September, German aircraft sank the Italian motor torpedo boat MS 1 at Stampalia. During the night of 22/23 September, Eclipse delivered 1,200 men with stores to Leros and then sailed southwards searching for U-boats. SS Gaetano Donizetti (2,424 GRT) requisitioned by the Germans, carrying 220 crew and guards, with 1,576 Italian prisoners of war, departed Rhodes and passed Cap Prasonisi on the south-west tip of Rhodes. Eclipse came upon and sank the steamer; about 1,200 of the crew and passengers were killed and then Eclipse damaged the torpedo boat TA10 that was beached by the crew. Three ships and two escorts en route to Heraklion in Crete were attacked near Milos by four 38 Squadron Wellingtons. SS Dithmarschen (1,171 GRT) was torpedoed and sunk against fairly intense Flak. The rest of the convoy reached Heraklion and the Wellingtons returned by 6:55 a.m.

On the night of 23/24 September, Seven Halifaxes from 46 Squadron and five B-24 Liberators of 179 Squadron bombed Maritza airfield on Rhodes and claimed two Ju 52s and an Italian aircraft destroyed. On 25 September, five Baltimore bombers of 454 Squadron RAAF and five Venturas of 459 Squadron RAAF attacked Heraklion in Crete. Four Beaufighters each from 227 Squadron and 252 Squadron from Lakatamia airfield on Cyprus, attacked TA10, still beached on the south coast of Rhodes.

On 26 September, at 7:00 a.m. Vasilissa Olga and Intrepid arrived at Lakki Bay, Leros and at 9:00 a.m. eight Ju 88s of 4. Staffel, II./KG 6, recently arrived from France and Ju 88 bombers of 11./ZG 26 with Bf 109 fighter escorts from III./JG 2, dive bombed the ships and severely damaged Vasilissa Olga, one of the Ju 88s being damaged by anti-aircraft fire from around the port and crashing near Athens. Two Italian CANT Z.501 flying boats of 147° Squadriglia were strafed and sunk in the harbour. During the afternoon, Ju 88s of 5./KG 6 from Larissa hit both ships that settled on the bottom with many casualties. On Kos, 7 Squadron SAAF had only two minutes' notice of the second raid of five Ju 88s and four Bf 109 escorts and shot down a Ju 88. To the west of Paphos in Cyprus, a Walrus amphibian of 294 Squadron rescued the pilot of a 213 Squadron Hurricane, within thirty minutes of him going into the water. After the attacks on Intrepid and Vasilissa Olga showed that Lakki was inadequately protected against air attack, Allied ships were limited to night sorties into the Aegean followed by a swift retreat to areas where they could receive air cover from the RAF aircraft based on Cyprus.

On Friday, 1 October, the fleet destroyers were sent from Alexandria to Malta to escort HMS King George V and Howe on their return voyage to Britain. The First Sea Lord, Admiral Sir Dudley Pound, was terminally-ill and near the end, his successor, Admiral Andrew Cunningham had been recalled to Britain and was not due back to the Mediterranean until 6 October. Admiral Algernon Willis deputised for him in Algiers and Admiral Sir John Cunningham had not been appointed to relieve Andrew Cunningham as Commander-in-Chief, Levant. The disruption to the navy of these senior command promotions and transfers came at the worst time for the garrisons in the Aegean, when there were only three Hunt-class destroyers available, of limited speed and endurance.

The Italian destroyer Euro was damaged and then sunk in Partheni Bay at Leros and on 2 October, most of III./JG 27 moved to Gadurra on Rhodes from Kastelli, Crete, ready for the invasion of Kos due on 3 October. During the afternoon, eight Bf 109s of 8. and 9. Staffel, JG 27 took off from Kastelly and encountered a Baltimore and shot it down. The invasion of Kos began at 5:00 a.m. with two destroyers, seven transports, seven landing craft, S-boats and caïques and by 10:30 a.m., 1,500 German troops had been landed and British wireless communication with Kos stopped. UJ 2102 was attacked by seven Beaufighters of 46 Squadron at 7:45 a.m. that also claimed a Ju 87 dive bomber shot down; a Beaufighter was shot down by one of six Ar 196s that attacked the formation and an Arado was claimed by a Beaufighter crew.

On 3 October, Unternehmen Eisbär, the German invasion of Kos began with seven transports, two destroyers and seven landing craft, S-boots and caïques, with little interference by British air or surface forces. A Beaufighter of 46 Squadron and two from 89 Squadron took of at 7:00 a.m. and attacked a corvette near Rhodes, receiving much anti-aircraft fire and two Beaufighters were damaged. On the return journey six Arado Ar 196 floatplanes attacked the Beaufighters and shot down the one from 46 Squadron and an Ar 196 was claimed as a probable. UJ 2102 reported an attack at 7:45 a.m. by seven Beaufighters, four probably from an earlier patrol by 46 Squadron, in which a Junkers Ju 87 was claimed shot down. A patrol at midday by 46 Squadron and 227 Squadron claimed another two Ju 87s over Kos. Next day at 4:45 p.m., five Ju 88s claimed hits on a warship and a merchant ship in Leros harbour.

The US 37th Fighter Squadron of the 14th Fighter Group arrived at RAF Gambut in Libya to reinforce the RAF effort in the Aegean on 5 October. During the morning, Lakki on Leros was attacked by 29 Ju 88s, 34 Ju 87s and 4 He 111s. The Ju 88s of II./KG 6 sank the Italian minelayer Legnano and the merchant ships Prode (1,244 GRT) and Porto di Rom (470 GRT). On the return flight, two of the German aircraft strafed a destroyer off Naxos, having dropped all their bombs. On 6 October, Eisenhower lent direct support to the British effort, two B-24 heavy bomber groups were sent to Benghazi, the rest of the 14th Fighter Group and the 1st Fighter Group to RAF Gambut (until 10 October). The RAF 603 Squadron Beaufighters and B-25 Mitchell H gunships of G Squadron, 321st Bomb Group. The first anti-shipping raid by the Ju 87s of I./StG 3 took place against British cruisers and destroyers in the Kasos Strait.

On 9 October, HMS Panther was sunk and the cruiser HMS Carlisle seriously damaged. The short range of the Hunt-class destroyers prevented HMS Aldenham, Pindos and Themistoklis from intercepting the German invasion convoy headed for Kos. After the loss of Kos and its air cover, the Allied navies concentrated on supplying Leros and Samos, mostly under the cover of night. From 22 to 24 October, Hurworth and Eclipse ran into a German minefield east of Kalymnos (north of Kos) and were sunk. The Adrias lost its prow, escaped to the Turkish coast and after makeshift repairs, sailed to Alexandria.

On the night of 18/19 October, a Wellington torpedo-bomber attacked and missed the 4,470 GRT MS Sinfra then homed more Wellingtons to the area. The first two Wellingtons to arrive attacked and one hit the ship towards the rear and was then hit by Flak. Sinfra sank off Souda Bay in Crete. The ship was carrying 2,389 Italian prisoners, 71 Greek prisoners and 204 German guards, of whom 1,998 were killed and 566 survived. (Note: Smith and Walker (1974 [2008]) wrote that 40 of 500 German troops were killed and of 2,000 pro-armistice Italians and 200 Greek partisans and that about 1,461 Italians and 187 Greeks, were killed.)

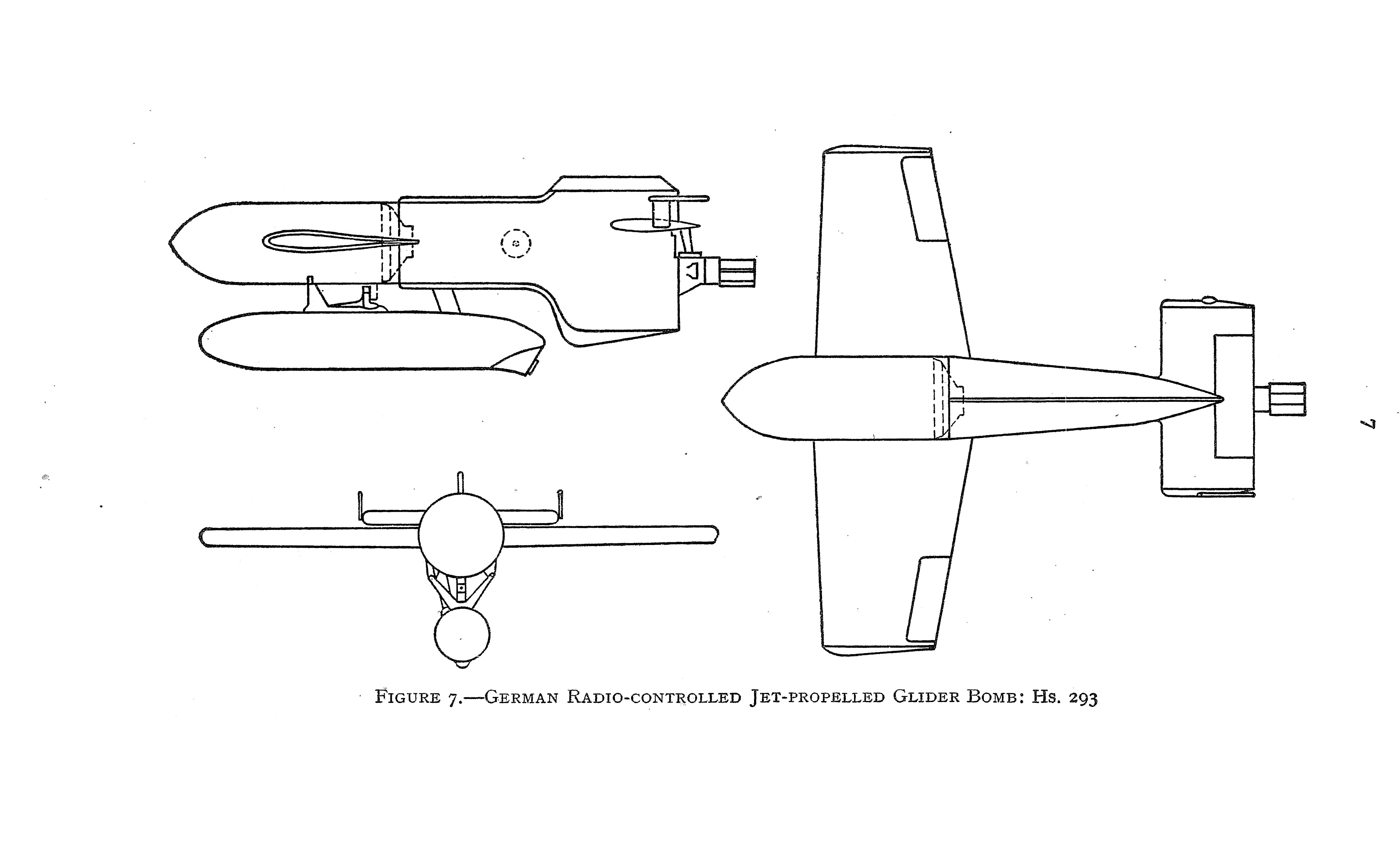
Henschel Hs 293 wireless-guided rocket-boosted, glide bomb

On the night of 10/11 November, the destroyers HMS Petard, Rockwood and ORP Krakowiak bombarded Kalymnos and Faulknor bombarded Kos, where German forces were assembling to attack Leros. The German convoy reached Leros on 12 November, escorted by over 25 ships, mostly anti-submarine vessels, torpedo boats and minesweepers. During the subsequent nights, Allied destroyers failed to find and destroy the German vessels, limiting themselves to bombarding the German positions on Leros.

By that time, the Germans had also used Dornier Do 217s of Kampfgeschwader 100 (KG 100), with their new Henschel Hs 293 radio-controlled missiles, one causing severe damage to Rockwood on 11 November and another sinking HMS Dulverton on 13 November.With the fall of Leros on 16 November, the Allied ships were withdrawn, evacuating the remaining British garrisons. The Allies lost six destroyers sunk and two cruisers and two destroyers damaged between 7 September and 28 November 1943.

== Aftermath ==
The Dodecanese campaign was one of the last British defeats in World War II and one of the last German victories, while others have labelled it a fiasco which was badly conceived, planned and executed as a "shoestring strategy". The German victory was predominantly due to their possession of air superiority, which caused great loss to the Allies, especially in ships and enabled the Germans to supply their forces. The revival of German fortunes in the eastern Mediterranean helped restore Spanish confidence in the German war effort, shaken by the Allied landings in Operation Torch the landings in North Africa and Operation Husky, the invasion of Sicily and ensured several more months of Spanish tungsten exports for German war industry.

=== Signals intelligence ===
British code-breakers decrypted a warning signal on 14 September as British troops landed on Kos that contradicts the official history account by Molony et al. A German report about the invasion of Kos was decrypted on 5 October but soon afterwards, another signal was decrypted of landing craft being dispatched to Syros, mid-way between Athens and Leros for future operations. Signals about a convoy from Athens to Kos, postponed several times and an attack order at 1:00 a.m. on 11 November, followed by a repeated signal on 12 November. After the invasion, two signals were decrypted of British resistance and one that the situation was deteriorating on the night of 14/15 and that the heavy equipment that afternoon was vital.

=== Genocide ===
The German occupation of the Dodecanese islands sealed the fate of Jews living there. Although Italy had passed the anti-Jewish law of the Manifesto of Race in 1938, Jews living on the Dodecanese islands (and Italian-occupied Greece) experienced much less antisemitism than in the German and Bulgarian occupied zones of Greece, which culminated in March 1943 with deportations to the death camps in occupied Poland. The Italian surrender, the German takeover and the failure of the Allied offensive meant that the haven disappeared. Most of the Dodecanese Jews were murdered by the Germans; 1,700 members of the ancient Jewish community of Rhodes (of a population of about 2,000 people) were rounded up by the Gestapo in July 1944 and only some 160 of them survived deportation.

=== Casualties ===
About 4,800 British troops were killed or captured; four cruisers were damaged, one being written off, six destroyers were sunk and four damaged, two submarines, ten coastal vessels and minesweepers were sunk. The RAF lost 115 aircraft and 20 were damaged. Luftwaffe losses are harder to quantify but contemporary reports have 135 aircraft shot down and 126 damaged; in 2008, Smith and Walker suggested that the loss was unlikely to be more than 120. The German communiqué after the capture of Leros claimed 3,200 British and 5,700 Italian troops for a loss of 1,109 troops, 41 per cent of the total. Müller wrote that the cost of capturing Kos and Leros was 260 men killed, 746 wounded and 162 missing; the British took 177 German prisoners off the island.

In 2010 Ian Gooderson wrote that the German success was costly, 1,109 casualties being suffered by the 4,500 German troops involved. Fifteen of the 45 vessels used by the Germans had been sunk or damaged. From the end of September to mid-November the Germans lost twelve merchant ships of about 21,000 GRT and at least 20 F-lighters, landing craft and other small vessels; the Luftwaffe lost 156 aircraft. The Germans transferred Italian prisoners in overcrowded vessels, that were unseaworthy, leading to several accidents. On the night of 12/13 February 1944, the 2,127 GRT ship SS Oria, was lost off Cape Sounion, trying to evade a submarine attack and more than 4,000 Italians were killed in the disaster.

== Orders of battle ==
=== Allied ===
==== Italian Army ====
Army of the Aegean (Esercito Cobelligerante Italiano)
Unit	Island	Notes
8 September 1943
6th Infantry Division "Cuneo" (Sporades, Cyclades)
7th Infantry Regiment "Cuneo"	Syros	
8th Infantry Regiment "Cuneo"	Samos	
24th CC.NN. Legion "Carroccio"	Samos	(attached)
27th Artillery Regiment "Cuneo"	Samos	
50th Infantry Division "Regina" (Dodecanese)
9th Infantry Regiment "Regina"	Rhodes	
10th Infantry Regiment "Regina"	Kos & Leros	
309th Infantry Regiment "Regina"	Rhodes	
331st Infantry Regiment "Brennero"	Rhodes	detached from 11th Infantry Division "Brennero"
201st CC.NN. Legion "Conte Verde"	Rhodes	(attached)
50th Artillery Regiment "Regina"	Rhodes	
51st Infantry Division "Siena" (Crete, 11th Army)
31st Infantry Regiment "Siena"	Crete	
32nd Infantry Regiment "Siena"	Crete	
51st Artillery Regiment "Siena"	Crete	
LI Special Brigade (Crete, 11th Army)
265th Infantry Regiment "Lecce"	Crete	
341st Infantry Regiment "Modena"	Crete	detached from 37th Infantry Division "Modena"
Non-divisional units
HQ 56th Anti-aircraft Artillery Grouping	Rhodes	
HQ 35th Coastal Artillery Grouping	Rhodes	
HQ 36th Coastal Artillery Grouping	Rhodes	
HQ 55th Coastal Artillery Grouping	Rhodes	

=== British and Allied air forces ===
RAF Middle East Command, 8 September
Group	Base	Sqns	Notes
AHQ Air Defences Eastern Mediterranean, Air Vice-Marshal Richard Saul
209 (Fighter) Group	Haifa, Beirut	1½ Beaufighter, 2 Hurricane, 1 Hurricane–Spitfire	
219 (Fighter) Group	E. Alexandria	½ Beaufighter, 2 Hurricane, 2 Spitfire	
Det. 201 (Naval Co-operation) Group	Limassol	2 Beaufighter	
Air chief Marshal Sholto Douglas–Naval C-in-C Levant
201 (Naval Co-operation) Group (less det.)	Misurata/Berka	1 Beaufort	
201 (Naval Co-operation) Group	Cyrenaica, Egypt, Palestine	4 Baltimore & Hudson, 1 Wellington TB, 1 PR	
Air chief Marshal Sholto Douglas
216 (Air Transport and Ferry) Group	—	22 × Dakota	

==== Allied air forces ====
Allied air forces
Unit	Force	Type	Role
7 Squadron	South African Air Force	Spitfire	Fighter
74 Squadron	Royal Air Force	Spitfire	Fighter
213 Squadron	Royal Air Force	Hurricane	Fighter
237 Squadron	Royal Air Force	Hurricane	Fighter (Rhodesian)
680 Squadron	Royal Air Force	Spitfire	Reconnaissance
46 Squadron	Royal Air Force	Beaufighter	Night fighter
47 Squadron	Royal Air Force	Beaufighter	Heavy fighter
89 Squadron	Royal Air Force	Beaufighter	Heavy fighter
227 Squadron	Royal Air Force	Beaufighter	Heavy fighter
252 Squadron	Royal Air Force	Beaufighter	Heavy fighter
603 Squadron	Royal Air Force	Beaufighter	Heavy fighter
13 Squadron	Hellenic Air Force	Blenheim, Baltimore	Medium bomber
15 Squadron	Royal Air Force	Baltimore	Medium bomber
38 Squadron	Royal Air Force	Wellington	Torpedo bomber
454 Squadron	Royal Australian Air Force	Baltimore	Medium bomber
459 Squadron	Royal Australian Air Force	Hudson	Maritime reconnaissance/light bomber
178 Squadron	Royal Air Force	Liberator	240 Wing, 9th Air Force, Heavy bomber
462 Squadron	Royal Australian Air Force	Halifax	240 Wing, 9th Air Force, Heavy bomber

=== British and Allied naval forces ===
British naval units, 8 September 1943
Destroyers	Hunt class	Submarines	ML	Landing craft	Caïques	RAF HSML
6	2	1st Flotilla	6	4	Levant Schooner Flotilla	4

=== Naval vessels ===
Naval forces
Ship	Navy	Type	Notes
Cruisers
HMS Aurora	Royal Navy	Arethusa-class cruiser	30 October, bomb damage, off Kastellorizo
HMS Penelope	Royal Navy	Arethusa-class cruiser	7 October, bomb damage, Kasos Strait
HMS Carlisle	Royal Navy	C-class cruiser	9 October, bomb damage, Kasos Strait
HMS Dido	Royal Navy	Dido-class cruiser	
HMS Phoebe	Royal Navy	Dido-class cruiser	
HMS Sirius	Royal Navy	Dido-class cruiser	17 October, bomb damage, Kasos Strait
Destroyers
8th Destroyer Flotilla
HMS Echo	Royal Navy	E-class destroyer	
HMS Eclipse	Royal Navy	E-class destroyer	24 October, sunk, Kalymnos 37°01′N, 27°11′E
HMS Faulknor	Royal Navy	F-class destroyer	
RHN Vasillissa Olga	Hellenic Navy	G-class destroyer	26 September, Hs 293 sunk, Leros
HMS Intrepid	Royal Navy	I-class destroyer	26 September, Hs 293, sunk Leros, 15†
HMS Raider	Royal Navy	R-class destroyer	
HMS Fury	Royal Navy	F-class destroyer	
HMS Jervis	Royal Navy	J-class destroyer	
HMS Panther	Royal Navy	P-class destroyer	9 October, bombed, sunk, Kasos Strait
HMS Pathfinder	Royal Navy	P-class destroyer	
HMS Penn	Royal Navy	P-class destroyer	16 November, damaged, gunfire, off Leros
HMS Petard	Royal Navy	P-class destroyer	
HMS Tumult	Royal Navy	T-class destroyer	
HMS Hambledon	Royal Navy	Hunt-class destroyer	
HMS Haydon	Royal Navy	Hunt-class destroyer	
HMS Hursley	Royal Navy	Hunt-class destroyer	17 October, damaged, gunfire, Kalymnos
HMS Hurworth	Royal Navy	Hunt-class destroyer	22 October, mined, Kalymnos, 36°59′N, 27°06′E
HMS Lamerton	Royal Navy	Hunt-class destroyer	
HMS Rockwood	Royal Navy	Hunt-class destroyer	11 November, Hs 293, Gulf of Kos, 36°25′N, 26°52′E
HMS Tetcott	Royal Navy	Hunt-class destroyer	
HMS Aldenham	Royal Navy	Hunt-class destroyer	
HMS Beaufort	Royal Navy	Hunt-class destroyer	
HMS Belvoir	Royal Navy	Hunt-class destroyer	
HMS Blencathra	Royal Navy	Hunt-class destroyer	
HMS Croome	Royal Navy	Hunt-class destroyer	
HMS Dulverton	Royal Navy	Hunt-class destroyer	13 November, Hs 293, sunk, Gulf of Kos
HMS Exmoor	Royal Navy	Hunt-class destroyer	
HMS Wilton	Royal Navy	Hunt-class destroyer	
Greek destroyers
RHN Adrias	Hellenic Navy	Hunt-class destroyer	22 October, damaged, mined off Kalymnos
RHN Kanaris	Hellenic Navy	Hunt-class destroyer	
RHN Miaoulis	Hellenic Navy	Hunt-class destroyer	
RHN Pindos	Hellenic Navy	Hunt-class destroyer	
RHN Themistoklis	Hellenic Navy	Hunt-class destroyer	
Polish destroyers
ORP Krakowiak	Polish Navy	Hunt-class destroyer	
Submarines
HMS Rorqual	Royal Navy	Grampus-class submarine	Minelayer
HMS Seraph	Royal Navy	British S-class submarine	
HMS Severn	Royal Navy	British S-class submarine	
HMS Shakespeare	Royal Navy	British S-class submarine	
HMS Sibyl	Royal Navy	British S-class submarine	
HMS Sickle	Royal Navy	British S-class submarine	
HMS Simoom	Royal Navy	British S-class submarine	15 November, ? mined, lost, off Dardanelles
HMS Sportsman	Royal Navy	British S-class submarine	
HMS Surf	Royal Navy	British S-class submarine	
HMS Torbay	Royal Navy	British T-class submarine	16 October, depth charged, damaged
HMS Trespasser	Royal Navy	British T-class submarine	
HMS Trooper	Royal Navy	British T-class submarine	14 September, ? mined, Aegean
HMS Unrivalled	Royal Navy	British U-class submarine	12 October, depth charged, damaged
HMS Unruly	Royal Navy	British U-class submarine	
HMS Unseen	Royal Navy	British U-class submarine	16 November, depth charged, damaged
HMS Unsparing	Royal Navy	British U-class submarine	31 October, gunfire, damaged
Greek submarines
RHS Katsonis	Hellenic Navy	Katsonis-class submarine	14 September, sunk
Polish submarines
ORP Dzik	Polish Navy	British U-class submarine	
ORP Sokół	Polish Navy	British U-class submarine	
Motor Torpedo Boats
10th MTB Flotilla
MTB 260	Royal Navy	Vosper 70ft MTB	
MTB 263	Royal Navy	Vosper 70ft MTB	
MTB 266	Royal Navy	70ft Elco	
MTB 307	Royal Navy	70ft Elco	
MTB 309	Royal Navy	70ft Elco	
MTB 313	Royal Navy	70ft Elco	17 October, bombed, damaged, Kastellorizo
MTB 315	Royal Navy	70ft Elco	
Motor Gun Boats
60th MGB Flotilla (part)
MGB 645	Royal Navy	Fairmile D	
MGB 646	Royal Navy	Fairmile D	
MGB 647	Royal Navy	Fairmile D	
Minesweepers
MMS 102	Royal Navy	MMS-class minesweeper	
MMS 103	Royal Navy	MMS-class minesweeper	
BYMS 72 (Note: British Yard Minesweeper)	Royal Navy	BYMS-class minesweeper	11/12 November, captured, Kalymnos
BYMS 73	Royal Navy	BYMS-class minesweeper	
Motor Launches (24th Flotilla and 42nd Flotilla)
ML 299	Royal Navy	Fairmile B motor launch	
ML 308	Royal Navy	Fairmile B motor launch	
ML 337	Royal Navy	Fairmile B motor launch	
ML 340	Royal Navy	Fairmile B motor launch	
ML 349	Royal Navy	Fairmile B motor launch	
ML 351	Royal Navy	Fairmile B motor launch	
ML 354	Royal Navy	Fairmile B motor launch	
ML 355	Royal Navy	Fairmile B motor launch	
ML 356	Royal Navy	Fairmile B motor launch	
ML 357	Royal Navy	Fairmile B motor launch	
ML 358	Royal Navy	Fairmile B motor launch	12 November, sunk, Leros
ML 359	Royal Navy	Fairmile B motor launch	
ML 456	Royal Navy	Fairmile B motor launch	12 November, damaged, gunfire, Leros
ML 461	Royal Navy	Fairmile B motor launch	
ML 579	Royal Navy	Fairmile B motor launch	26 October, bombed, sunk off Lipsos
ML 835	Royal Navy	Fairmile B motor launch	11 October, bombed, sunk, Levitha
ML 836	Royal Navy	Fairmile B motor launch	
ML 1005	Royal Navy	Fairmile B motor launch	21 October, foundered, Aegean
ML 1015	Royal Navy	Fairmile B motor launch	21 October, foundered, Aegean
LCT 3	Royal Navy	Landing craft tank	2 3 October, lost, Kos
LCT 115	Royal Navy	Landing craft tank	28 October, bombed, sunk of Kastellorizo
LCM 923	Royal Navy	Landing craft mechanized	11 November, captured, Leros
HMLS Hedgehog	Royal Navy	Levant Schooner Flotilla Trawler	17 October, engine trouble, captured, Levitha
RAF High-Speed Launch
HSL 2517	Royal Air Force	High-speed launch	
HSL 2531	Royal Air Force	High-speed launch	
HSL 2539	Royal Air Force	High-speed launch	
HSL 2542	Royal Air Force	High-speed launch	
Marina Cobelligerante Italiana
Euro	Kingdom of Italy	Turbine-class destroyer	1 October, bombed, Partheni Bay, Leros, settled
Legnano	Kingdom of Italy	Azio-class minelayer	5 October, bombed, Port Lakki, Leros

=== Submarine supply voyages to Leros ===
Submarine voyages October−November 1943
Name	Navy	Type	Tons	Notes
HMS Severn	Royal Navy	River-class submarine	41.5 long tons (42.2 t)	21–22 October
HMS Rorqual	Royal Navy	Grampus-class submarine	50 long tons (51 t)	23–24 October
Zoea	Kingdom of Italy	Foca-class submarine	50 long tons (51 t)	26–27 October
Filippo Corridoni	Kingdom of Italy	Bragadin-class submarine	45 long tons (46 t)	29–30 October
Atropo	Kingdom of Italy	Foca-class submarine	43.5 long tons (44.2 t)	30–31 October
Ciro Menotti	Kingdom of Italy	Bandiera-class submarine	49 long tons (50 t)	31 October – 1 November
Zoea	Kingdom of Italy	Foca-class submarine	48.5 long tons (49.3 t)	6–7 November

== German order of battle ==
=== Luftwaffe airfields ===
Luftwaffe bomber bases, in descending order of importance
Greece	Crete	Rhodes	Notes
Eleusis	Heraklion	Calato	
Kalamaki	Kastelli	Maritza	
Tatoi	Tymbaki	Cattavia	British knew in August Cattavia closed
Sedes	Maleme		
Larissa			

=== Fliegerkorps X ===
X.Fliegerkorps 3 October 1943
Gruppe	Force	Staffel	Type	Role	Base
II./KG 6	Luftwaffe	4, 5, 6	Junkers Ju 88	Bomber	Larissa
II./KG 51	Luftwaffe	4, 5, 6	Junkers Ju 88	Bomber	Sedes
KG 100	Luftwaffe	1	Dornier 217 K3	Bomber	Eleusis
Staffel LG 1	Luftwaffe	1	Junkers Ju 88	Bomber	Eleusis
StG 3	Luftwaffe	Stab	Junkers Ju 87	Dive bomber	Eleusis
I./StG 3	Luftwaffe	1, 2, 3	Junkers Ju 87	Dive bomber	Megara
II./StG 3	Luftwaffe	4, 5, 6	Junkers Ju 87	Dive bomber	Argos
StG 151	Luftwaffe	13	Junkers Ju 87	Dive bomber	
JG 27	Luftwaffe	Stab	Messerschmitt Bf 109	Fighter	Kalamaki
III./JG 27	Luftwaffe	7, 8, 9	Messerschmitt Bf 109	Fighter	Argos
IV./JG 27	Luftwaffe	10, 11, 12	Messerschmitt Bf 109	Fighter	Argos, Kalamaki, Maleme
II./ZG 26	Luftwaffe	4, 5, 6, 11	Junkers Ju 88	Bomber	Kastelli
2./NAGr 2	Luftwaffe	—	Arado Ar 196	Reconnaissance	Ioanina, Argos
3./NAGr 2	Luftwaffe	—	Arado Ar 196	Reconnaissance	Devoli, Larissa
(F)/123	Luftwaffe	2	—	Reconnaissance	Tatoi, Kastelli, Gadurra
(F)/122	Luftwaffe	1	—	Reconnaissance	Kastelli
SAGr 125	Luftwaffe	2	Arado Ar 196	Maritime reconnaissance	Devoli, Larissa
SAGr 125	Luftwaffe	6	Arado Ar 196	Maritime reconnaissance	Skaramangas
Wekusta 27	Luftwaffe		—	Weather Reconnaissance	Tatoi, Kastelli
TG 4	Luftwaffe	1	Junkers Ju 52	Transport	
TG Go242.2	Luftwaffe	1	Gotha Go 242	Transport glider	

=== Kriegsmarine ===
Ships commandeered by the Kriegsmarine
Name	Ex-	Navy	Type	Notes
Commandeered ships
ZG3	Vasilefs Georgios	Kriegsmarine	G-class destroyer	May 1942 – 7 May 1943 (scuttled)
TA10	La Pomone	Kriegsmarine	La Melpomène-class torpedo boat	7 April – 23 September 1943 (sunk)
TA12	Baliste	Kriegsmarine	La Melpomène-class torpedo boat	12 August, sunk, aircraft 35°08′N, 27°53′E
TA14	Turbine	Kriegsmarine	Turbine-class destroyer	28 October 1943 − 15 September 1944 (sunk)
TA15	Francesco Crispi	Kriegsmarine	Sella-class destroyer	Ex-TA17, 20 October 1943 − 8 March 1944 (sunk)
TA16	Castelfidaro	Kriegsmarine	Curtatone-class destroyer	14 October 1943 − 2 June 1944 (sunk)
TA17	San Martino	Kriegsmarine	Palestro-class destroyer	Ex-TA18, 28 October 1943 – 18 September 1944
TA18	Solferino	Kriegsmarine	Palestro-class destroyer	25 July – 19 October 1944 (sunk)
TA19	Catalafimi	Kriegsmarine	Curtatone-class destroyer	13 September 1943 – 9 August 1944 (sunk)
UJ2109	HMS Widnes	Kriegsmarine	Hunt-class minesweeper	16 January – 17 October, sunk
Drache/Schiff 50	Zmaj	Kriegsmarine	Minelayer	22 December 1944, Sunk, Vathy, Samos, RAF

=== German auxiliary craft ===
Kriegsmarine auxiliary vessels
Name	Navy	Type	Notes
F-lighters
MFP 131	Kriegsmarine	Marinefährprahm	
MFP 308	Kriegsmarine	Marinefährprahm	
MFP 327	Kriegsmarine	Marinefährprahm	
MFP 330	Kriegsmarine	Marinefährprahm	
MFP 336	Kriegsmarine	Marinefährprahm	
MFP 338	Kriegsmarine	Marinefährprahm	
MFP 370	Kriegsmarine	Marinefährprahm	
MFP 494	Kriegsmarine	Marinefährprahm	
MFP 496	Kriegsmarine	Marinefährprahm	
MFP 523	Kriegsmarine	Marinefährprahm	
MFP 532	Kriegsmarine	Marinefährprahm	
12.Räumboots Flottille
R 34	Kriegsmarine	Minesweeper	
R 194	Kriegsmarine	Minesweeper	
R 195	Kriegsmarine	Minesweeper	
R 210	Kriegsmarine	Minesweeper	

== See also ==
- The Guns of Navarone (1957), novel
- The Guns of Navarone (1961), film

== Sources ==
=== Books ===
- Bennett, Ralph (1989). Ultra and Mediterranean Strategy 1941−1945. London: Hamish Hamilton. ISBN 978-0-24-112687-5.
- Brown, David (1995) [1990]. Warship Losses of World War II (2nd pbk. ed.). London: Arms and Armour. ISBN 978-1-85-409278-6.
- Cunningham, A. (1951). A Sailor's Odyssey: the Autobiography of Admiral of the Fleet Viscount Cunningham of Hyndhope. London: Hutchinson. OCLC 882476825.
- Dunning, Chris (1998). Courage Alone: The Italian Air Force 1940–1943. Aldershot: Hikoki. ISBN 1-902109-02-3.
- Hilberg, Raul (2003). The Destruction of the European Jews (3rd rev. ed.). New Haven and London: Yale University Press. ISBN 0-300-09557-0.
- Jordan, Roger W. (2006) [1999]. The World's Merchant Fleets 1939: The Particulars and Wartime Fates of 6,000 Ships (2nd ed.). London: Chatham/Lionel Leventhal. ISBN 978-1-86176-293-1.
- Molony, C. J. C.; Flynn, F. C.; Davies, Henry; Gleave, Tom (2004) [1973]. "Chapter XV Operations in the Aegean, Autumn 1943; The War at Sea; Conferences at Cairo and Teheran". The Mediterranean and Middle East: The Campaign in Sicily 1943 and The Campaign in Italy, 3rd September 1943 to 31st March 1944. History of the Second World War: United Kingdom, Military Series (Pbk. facs. repr. The Naval & Military Press, Uckfield ed.). London: HMSO. pp. 531–559. ISBN 978-1-84-574069-6 – via Archive Foundation.
- O'Hara, Vincent P. (2009). Struggle for the Middle Sea: The Great Navies at War in the Mediterranean Theater, 1940–1945. London: Conway. ISBN 978-1-84486-102-6.
- Porch, Douglas (2005) [2004]. Hitler's Mediterranean Gamble: The North African and the Mediterranean Campaigns in World War II (2nd pbk. repr. Cassell Military Paperbacks, London ed.). London: Weidenfeld & Nicolson. ISBN 978-0-30-436705-4 – via Archive Foundation.
- Preston, Paul (1995). Franco: A Biography. Fontana. ISBN 978-0-00-686210-9.
- Rogers, Anthony (2003). Churchill's Folly: Leros and the Aegean — The Last Great British Defeat of World War II. London: Cassell. ISBN 978-0-30-436151-9.
- Rogers, Anthony (2007). Churchill's Folly: Leros and the Aegean: The Last Great British Defeat of World War II. Athens: Iolkos. ISBN 978-960-426-434-6.
- Rohwer, Jürgen; Hümmelchen, Gerhard (2005) [1972]. Chronology of the War at Sea, 1939–1945: The Naval History of World War Two (3rd rev. ed.). London: Chatham. ISBN 1-86176-257-7 – via Archive Foundation.
- Roskill, Stephen (1960). Butler, J. R. M. (ed.). The War at Sea 1939–1945: The Offensive Part I 1st June 1943 – 31st May 1944. History of the Second World War United Kingdom Military Series. Vol. III. London: HMSO. OCLC 987392618.
- Shores, Christopher; Massimello, Giovanni; Guest, Russell; Olynyk, Frank; Bock, Winfried; Thomas, Andy (2021). A History of the Mediterranean Air War 1940–1945: From the Fall of Rome to the End of the War 1944–1945. Vol. V. London: Grub Street. ISBN 978-1-911621-97-3.
- Smith, Peter; Walker, Edwin (2008) [1974]. War in the Aegean: The Campaign for the Eastern Mediterranean in WWII. Stackpole Military History. Mechanicsburg, PA: Stackpole Books. ISBN 978-0-8117-3519-3.

=== Journals ===
- Gooderson, Ian (2010) [2002]. "Shoestring Strategy: The British Campaign in the Aegean, 1943". Journal of Strategic Studies. 25 (3): 1–36. doi:10.1080/01402390412331302755. ISSN 1743-937X.
