= Italian submarine Foca =

Foca was the name of at least two ships of the Italian Navy and may refer to:

- Italian submarine Foca (1908), a submarine launched in 1908 and discarded in 1918.
- Italian submarine Foca (1937), a Foca-class submarine launched in 1937 and sunk in 1940.
