= Italian submarine Zoea =

Zoea was the name of at least two ships of the Italian Navy and may refer to:

- Italian submarine Zoea (1913), a Medusa-class submarine launched in 1913 and discarded in 1918.
- Italian submarine Zoea (1937), a Foca-class submarine launched in 1937 and discarded in 1947.
