= Italian submarine Atropo (1938) =

Submarine

History

Italy
- Name: Atropo
- Namesake: Atropos
- Builder: Cantieri navali Tosi di Taranto, Taranto
- Laid down: 10 July 1937
- Launched: 20 November 1938
- Commissioned: 14 February 1939
- Decommissioned: 23 March 1947

General characteristics (as built)
- Class & type: Foca-class submarine minelayer
- Displacement: 1,326 t (1,305 long tons) (surfaced); 1,651 t (1,625 long tons) (submerged)
- Length: 82.85 m (271 ft 10 in)
- Beam: 7.17 m (23 ft 6 in)
- Draft: 5.2 m (17 ft 1 in)
- Installed power: 2,880 bhp (2,150 kW) (diesels); 1,250 hp (930 kW) (electric motors)
- Propulsion: 2 shafts; diesel-electric; 2 × diesel engines; 2 × electric motors
- Speed: 15.2 knots (28.2 km/h; 17.5 mph) (surfaced); 7.4 knots (13.7 km/h; 8.5 mph) (submerged)
- Range: 7,800 nmi (14,400 km; 9,000 mi) at 8 knots (15 km/h; 9.2 mph) (surfaced); 120 nmi (220 km; 140 mi) at 8 knots (15 km/h; 9.2 mph) (submerged)
- Test depth: 90 m (300 ft)
- Complement: 60
- Armament: 6 × 533 mm (21 in) torpedo tubes (4 bow, 2 stern); 1 × single 100 mm (3.9 in) deck gun; 2 × twin 13.2 mm (0.52 in) machine guns; 36 mines

Atropo was one of three Foca-class submarine minelayers built for the Regia Marina (Royal Italian Navy) during the late 1930s.

== Design and description ==
The Foca-class submarines were improved versions of the preceding Pietro Micca. They displaced 1,326 metric tons (1,305 long tons) surfaced and 1,625 long tons (1,651 t) submerged. The submarines were 82.85 meters (271 ft 10 in) long, had a beam of 7.17 meters (23 ft 6 in) and a draft of 5.2 meters (17 ft 1 in). They had an operational diving depth of 90 meters (300 ft). Their crew numbered 60 officers and enlisted men.

For surface running, the boats were powered by two 1,440-brake-horsepower (1,074 kW) diesel engines, each driving one propeller shaft. When submerged each propeller was driven by a 625-horsepower (466 kW) electric motor. They could reach 15.2 knots (28.2 km/h; 17.5 mph) on the surface and 7.4 knots (13.7 km/h; 8.5 mph) underwater. On the surface, the Foca class had a range of 7,800 nautical miles (14,400 km; 9,000 mi) at 8 knots (15 km/h; 9.2 mph), submerged, they had a range of 120 nmi (220 km; 140 mi) at 7 knots (13 km/h; 8.1 mph).

The boats were armed with six internal 53.3-centimeter (21 in) torpedo tubes, four in the bow and two in the stern, for which they carried eight torpedoes. They were also armed with one 100-millimeter (3.9 in) deck gun for combat on the surface. The gun was initially mounted in the rear of the conning tower, but this was re-sited on the forward deck later in the war in the surviving boats and the large conning tower was re-built to a smaller design. Their anti-aircraft armament consisted of two pairs of 13.2-millimeter (0.52 in) machine guns. The Focas carried a total of 36 mines that they ejected through chutes in the stern.

== Construction and career ==
Atropo was laid down by Cantieri navali Tosi di Taranto at their Taranto shipyard on 10 July 1937, launched on 20 November 1938 and completed on 14 February 1939.

== Bibliography ==
- Bagnasco, Erminio (1977). Submarines of World War Two. Annapolis, Maryland: Naval Institute Press. ISBN 0-87021-962-6.
- Brescia, Maurizio (2012). Mussolini's Navy: A Reference Guide to the Regina Marina 1930–45. Annapolis, Maryland: Naval Institute Press. ISBN 978-1-59114-544-8.
- Chesneau, Roger, ed. (1980). Conway's All the World's Fighting Ships 1922–1946. Greenwich, UK: Conway Maritime Press. ISBN 0-85177-146-7.
- Fraccaroli, Aldo (1968). Italian Warships of World War II. Shepperton, UK: Ian Allan. ISBN 0-7110-0002-6.
- Rohwer, Jürgen (2005). Chronology of the War at Sea 1939–1945: The Naval History of World War Two (Third Revised ed.). Annapolis, Maryland: Naval Institute Press. ISBN 1-59114-119-2.
