= Robert Tilney =

British army commander (1903–1981)

Brigadier Robert Adolphus George Tilney CBE DSO TD DL (2 November 1903 – May 1981) was a British Army officer who served during the Second World War.

== Military career ==
Robert Tilney was a Territorial Army officer, formerly of the Leicestershire Yeomanry. He was the son of Colonel William Arthur Tilney and Hylda Sophia Paget.

On 5 November 1943 Tilney was appointed to command the British forces on the Greek island of Leros, replacing Major-General F.G.R. Brittorous. He had under his command the 234th Infantry Brigade and an assortment of Royal Air Force and Italian Navy troops. The island of Leros was invaded by German forces on 12 November 1943 and Tilney surrendered on 16 November. Tilney spent the rest of the war as a POW in camp Oflag IX-A/H in Germany. His POW number there was 1765.

In 1945 he was awarded the Distinguished Service Order and in 1962 he was appointed a Commander of the Order of the British Empire.
