= Cantieri navali Tosi di Taranto =

Italian shipyard (1914–1990)

The Cantieri navali Tosi di Taranto (Tosi Shipyard at Taranto) is a defunct Italian shipyard founded in 1914 by engineering company Franco Tosi & C. Between World War I and World War II it specialized in building submarines. The company never really recovered from the devastation from World War II and it was one of the first acquisitions of the newly formed financial holding company, Fincantieri, on 29 December 1959. The shipyard closed on 31 December 1990.

== Ships built ==
Some of the vessels built at this shipyard are listed below.

=== Submarines ===
For the Regia Marina

- N class : 2 of 6 units, built 1917-19
- Mameli class : 4 units, built 1926–28
- Bragadin class : 2 units, built 1929–30
- Settembrini class : 2 units, built 1930–31
- Argonauta class : 2 of 7 units, built 1931–32
- Sirena class : 2 of 12 units, built 1933
- Archimede class : 4 units, built 1933–34
- Micca class : 1 unit, built 1935
- Adua class : 4 of 17 units, built 1936–38
- Foca class : 3 units, built 1937–38
- Brin class : 5 units, built 1938–39
- Liuzzi class : 4 units, built 1939–40
- Acciaio class : 3 of 13 units, built 1941–42
- Romolo class : 2 of 12 units built, 1943
- Flutto class (Type I): 2 units 1943 (not completed)

For the Marina Militare

- Pietro Calvi (1959)

For foreign navies

- Santa Fe (1931) - Argentine Navy
- Santiago del Estero (1932) - Argentine Navy
- Salta (1932) - Argentine Navy

=== Warships ===
- Tarantola (1942) - ammunition transport, Regia Marina
- Canopo D-570 (1955) - frigate, Marina Militare
- Cigno D-572 (1955) - frigate, Marina Militare
- Castore D-573 (1955) - frigate, Marina Militare
- Trifoglio M 5541 (1955) - minesweeper, Marina Militare

=== Other ships ===
- Principessa Giovanna (1923) - passenger ship, later converted to hospital ship
- Epomeo (1929) - passenger ship, later converted to auxiliary cruiser
- Lago Zuai (1939) - cargo ship, later converted to auxiliary cruiser
- Sestriere (1943) - passenger ship
- Sises (1948) - passenger ship
- Paşabahçe (1952) - laid down for Regia Marina during WWII, later converted to passenger ship for İstanbul Şehir Hatları

== Bibliography ==
- Brescia, Maurizio (2012). Mussolini's Navy: A Reference Guide to the Regina Marina 1930–45. Annapolis, Maryland: Naval Institute Press. ISBN 978-1-59114-544-8.
