= Foca-class submarine =

Group of three minelaying submarines built for the Royal Italian Navy in the 1930s

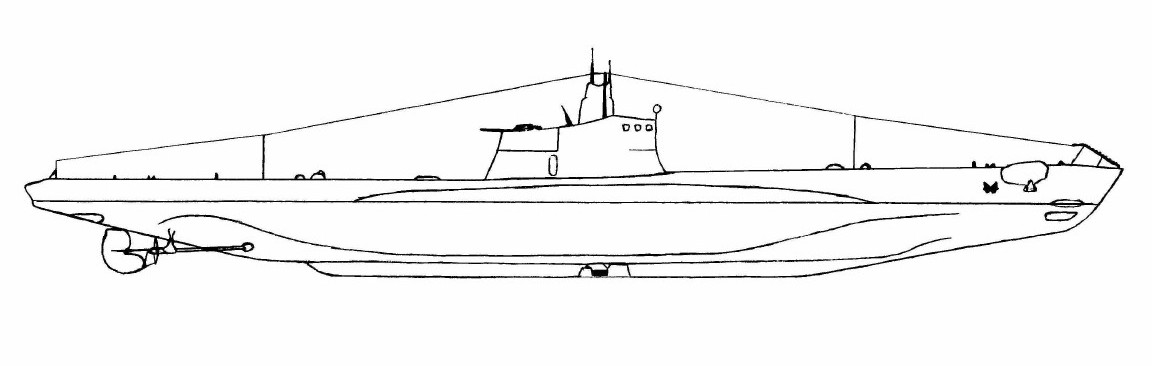
- Foca in 1937

Class overview
- Name: Foca class
- Builders: Cantieri navali Tosi di Taranto, Taranto
- Operators: Regia Marina
- Preceded by: Pietro Micca
- Succeeded by: None
- Built: 1936–1938
- In service: 1936–1947
- Completed: 3
- Lost: 1
- Scrapped: 2

General characteristics (as built)
- Type: Minelaying submarine
- Displacement: 1,326 t (1,305 long tons) (surfaced); 1,651 t (1,625 long tons) (submerged)
- Length: 82.85 m (271 ft 10 in)
- Beam: 7.17 m (23 ft 6 in)
- Draft: 5.2 m (17 ft 1 in)
- Installed power: 2,880 bhp (2,150 kW) (diesels); 1,250 hp (930 kW) (electric motors)
- Propulsion: 2 shafts; diesel-electric; 2 × diesel engines; 2 × electric motors
- Speed: 15.2 knots (28.2 km/h; 17.5 mph) (surfaced); 7.4 knots (13.7 km/h; 8.5 mph) (submerged)
- Range: 7,800 nmi (14,400 km; 9,000 mi) at 8 knots (15 km/h; 9.2 mph) (surfaced); 120 nmi (220 km; 140 mi) at 8 knots (15 km/h; 9.2 mph) (submerged)
- Test depth: 90 m (300 ft)
- Complement: 60
- Armament: 6 × 533 mm (21 in) torpedo tubes (4 bow, 2 stern); 1 × single 100 mm (3.9 in) deck gun; 2 × twin 13.2 mm (0.52 in) anti-aircraft guns; 36 mines

The Foca class were a group of three minelaying submarines built for the Regia Marina (Royal Italian Navy) during the 1930s. All three sister ships played minor roles during the Second World War. One was lost to unknown causes while trying to lay a minefield off British Palestine in 1940, but the other two survived the war to be discarded in 1947.

== Design and description ==
The Foca-class submarines were improved versions of the preceding Pietro Micca. They displaced 1,326 metric tons (1,305 long tons) surfaced and 1,625 long tons (1,651 t) submerged. The submarines were 82.85 meters (271 ft 10 in) long, had a beam of 7.17 meters (23 ft 6 in) and a draft of 5.2 meters (17 ft 1 in). They had an operational diving depth of 90 meters (300 ft). Their crew numbered 60 officers and men.

For surface running, the boats were powered by two 1,440-brake-horsepower (1,074 kW) diesel engines, each driving one propeller shaft. When submerged each propeller was driven by a 625-horsepower (466 kW) electric motor. They could reach 15.2 knots (28.2 km/h; 17.5 mph) on the surface and 7.4 knots (13.7 km/h; 8.5 mph) underwater. On the surface, the Foca class had a range of 7,800 nautical miles (14,400 km; 9,000 mi) at 8 knots (15 km/h; 9.2 mph), submerged, they had a range of 120 nmi (220 km; 140 mi) at 7 knots (13 km/h; 8.1 mph).

The boats were armed with six internal 53.3-centimeter (21.0 in) torpedo tubes, four in the bow and two in the stern, for which they carried eight torpedoes. They were also armed with one 100-millimeter (4 in) deck gun for combat on the surface. The gun was initially mounted in the rear of the conning tower, but this was re-sited on the forward deck later in the war in the surviving boats and the large conning tower was re-built to a smaller design. Their anti-aircraft armament consisted of two pairs of 13.2-millimeter (0.52 in) machine guns. The Focas carried a total of 36 mines. Twenty mines were stored in a central chamber, while the remaining 16 mines were kept in two aft chutes through which the mines were ejected.

== Boats ==
Construction data
| Ship | Builder | Laid down | Launched | Completed | Fate |
|---|---|---|---|---|---|
| Foca | Cantieri navali Tosi di Taranto | 15 January 1936 | 26 June 1937 | 6 November 1937 | Lost 13 October 1940 off Haifa, British Palestine |
| Atropo | Cantieri navali Tosi di Taranto | 10 July 1937 | 20 November 1938 | 14 February 1939 | Discarded, 23 March 1947 |
| Zoea | Cantieri navali Tosi di Taranto | 3 February 1936 | 5 December 1937 | 12 February 1938 | Discarded, 23 March 1947 |

== Service ==
The lead boat, Foca, was lost to unknown causes on 13 October 1940 while laying mines off Haifa. Atropo and Zoea, the second and third vessels of the class, were used after Italy's 1943 surrender by the Allies for anti-submarine training. Both were scrapped in 1947.

== See also ==
- Italian submarines of World War II
