= Italian submarine Pietro Micca (1935) =

Italian submarine

History

Kingdom of Italy
- Name: Pietro Micca
- Builder: Tosi (Taranto, Italy)
- Laid down: 15 October 1931
- Launched: 31 March 1935
- Fate: Torpedoed 29 July 1943

General characteristics
- Type: Submarine minelayer
- Displacement: 1,371 tons (surface); 1,883 tons (submerged)
- Length: 296 ft (90 m)
- Beam: 25 ft (7.6 m)
- Draught: 17.5 ft (5.3 m)
- Installed power: Surfaced: Tosi diesel engine, 3,000 bhp (2,200 kW); Submerged: 2 x Marelli electric motors, 1,600 hp (1,200 kW)
- Propulsion: 2 shafts
- Speed: 15.5 kn (28.7 km/h) surfaced; 8.5 kn (15.7 km/h) submerged
- Complement: 72
- Armament: 2 × 120mm/45 guns; 4 × 13.2mm machine guns; 6 × 53.3 cm (21") torpedo tubes (4 bow, 2 stern); 40 mines

Pietro Micca (pennant number MC) was an Italian submarine which served with the Regia Marina in World War II. She was the third ship named after Pietro Micca, the Savoyard soldier who became a national hero for his sacrifice in the defence of Turin against the French troops in 1706. This boat was the prototype for a class of fast, long range submarines with conventional torpedo armament, naval mine laying capability, and useful secret transport capacity. The ship was built at the Tosi shipyard in Taranto. She was laid down on 15 October 1931 and launched on 31 March 1935. The boat fully met design requirements, but was too expensive to be repeated.

== Career ==
Pietro Micca was delivered to the Navy on 1 October 1935. The boat undertook two Spanish Civil War patrols in support of Francisco Franco on 23 January and 13 February 1937. As the largest Regia Marina submarine, Pietro Micca led the submarine fleet for the 5 May 1938, Naples naval parade to honor Adolf Hitler. Micca was at sea when Italy declared war, and laid a minefield off Alexandria on 12 June 1940. Micca returned to lay a second minefield off Alexandria on 12 August 1940. Italy kept the vessel in the Mediterranean Sea despite Kriegsmarine requests for temporary assignment to BETASOM to assist minelaying at Freetown, Cape Town, and Madagascar. Transport of food, gasoline and ammunition to the Aegean Sea and North Africa became her primary mission by the end of 1940; and Micca transported a total of 2,163 tons of essential cargo in 14 resupply missions before being torpedoed by HMS Trooper southwest of Cape Santa Maria di Leuca at 06:05 on 29 July 1943. There were 18 survivors.
