= HMS Phoebe (43) =

Dido-class light cruiser of the Royal Navy, launched in 1939

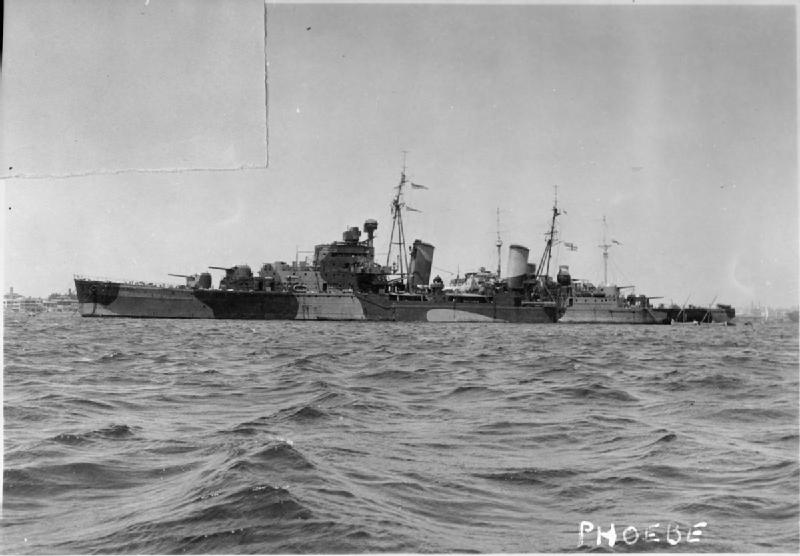
- Phoebe at anchor on completion

History

United Kingdom
- Name: Phoebe
- Builder: Fairfield Shipbuilding and Engineering Company (Govan, Scotland)
- Laid down: 2 September 1937
- Launched: 25 March 1939
- Commissioned: 27 September 1940
- Decommissioned: 14 March 1953
- Out of service: 14 March 1951
- Identification: Pennant number 43
- Fate: Scrapped, 1 August 1956

General characteristics (as built)
- Class & type: Dido-class light cruiser
- Displacement: 5,600 tons standard; 6,850 tons full load
- Length: 485 ft (148 m) pp; 512 ft (156 m) oa
- Beam: 50.5 ft (15.4 m)
- Draught: 14 ft (4.3 m)
- Installed power: Four Admiralty 3-drum boilers; 62,000 shp (46 MW)
- Propulsion: 4 shafts; 4 geared steam turbines
- Speed: 32.25 knots (59.73 km/h; 37.11 mph)
- Range: 2,414 km (1,500 miles) at 30 knots; 6,824 km (4,240 miles) at 16 knots
- Complement: 480
- Armament: 8 (4×2) 5.25-inch (133 mm) guns, 1 × 4.0 in (102 mm) gun, 8 (2×4) 0.5-inch (12.7 mm) machine guns; 12 (3×4) 2-pounder (40 mm) anti-aircraft guns; 6 (2×3) 21-inch (533 mm) torpedo tubes
- Armour: Belt: 3 in (76 mm); Deck: 1 in (25 mm); Magazines: 2 in (51 mm); Bulkheads: 1 in (25 mm)

HMS Phoebe was a Dido-class light cruiser of the Royal Navy. She was built by Fairfield Shipbuilding and Engineering Company (Govan, Scotland), her keel was laid down on 2 September 1937. She was launched on 25 March 1939, and commissioned on 30 September 1940.

== Construction and design ==
The Dido-class were designed as small cruisers capable of being built quickly and in large numbers to allow a shortfall in numbers of cruisers against the numbers which were required to meet the Royal Navy's needs. Rather than the mixed armament of single-purpose 6-inch (152 mm) low-angle (anti-ship) and 4-inch (102 mm) high-angle (anti-aircraft) guns carried by previous light cruisers, it was decided to fit a dual-purpose main armament, capable of both anti-ship and anti-aircraft fire. This used the new 5.25-inch (133 mm) gun as used in the King George V-class battleships.

Phoebe was 512 ft (156.06 m) long overall and 485 ft (147.83 m) between perpendiculars, with a beam of 50 feet 6 inches (15.4 m) and a mean draught of 16 feet 6 inches (5.0 m) (increasing to 17 feet 3 inches (5.3 m) at full load. Displacement was 5,600 long tons (5,700 t) standard and 6,850 long tons (6,960 t) full load. The ship's machinery was arranged in a four-shaft layout, with four Admiralty 3-drum boilers supplying steam at 400 psi (2,800 kPa) to Parsons single-reduction geared steam turbines, rated at 62,000 shaft horsepower (46,000 kW), giving a speed of 32.25 knots (59.73 km/h; 37.11 mph). 1,100 long tons (1,100 t) of fuel oil were carried, giving a range of 4,240 nautical miles (7,850 km; 4,880 mi) at 16 knots (30 km/h; 18 mph), reducing to 3,480 nmi (6,440 km; 4,000 mi) at 20 knots (37 km/h; 23 mph) and 1,500 nmi (2,800 km; 1,700 mi) at 32 knots (59 km/h; 37 mph).

While the class had a design main armament of ten 5.25-inch guns in five twin turrets on the ship's centreline, with three forward and two aft, Phoebe completed with only four turrets giving eight 5.25-inch guns, with a single low-angle low angle 4-inch (102 mm) gun mounted in 'C'-position, immediately forward of the ship's bridge, to fire star shell. Two quadruple 2-pounder (40 mm) pom-pom mounts were mounted on the ship's beams to provide close-in anti-aircraft protection, backed up by two quadruple .50 in (12.7 mm) machine guns on the bridge wings. Two triple 21-inch (533 mm) torpedo tubes provided additional anti-ship capability. Fire control for this armament was provided by a single low angle director control tower (DCT) on the ship's bridge, together with two High Angle Control System (HACS) director towers, one on the ship's bridge and one aft, while Type 279 air warning radar was fitted. A 3 in (76 mm) armour belt protected the ship's machinery and magazines with 1 in (25 mm) protecting the ship's shell rooms. Deck armour was also an inch thick, with 3 in (76 mm) plates over the magazines. The 5.25 inch gun turrets had armour of 1 1/2–1 in (38–25 mm) thickness.

Phoebe was one of five Dido-class cruisers ordered under the 1936 construction programme for the Royal Navy. Phoebe was laid down at Fairfield Shipbuilding and Engineering Company's Govan shipyard as Yard number 666 on 2 September 1937, was launched on 25 March 1939 and completed on 27 September 1940. Phoebe was the fifth ship of that name to serve with the Royal Navy.

=== Modifications ===
While Phoebe was repaired and refitted at New York from November 1941 to April 1942, the ship's close-in anti-aircraft armament was strengthened by replacing the 4-inch gun by a third quadruple pom-pom mount, while eleven single Oerlikon 20 mm cannon were fitted, with the .50 in machine guns removed. The ship's radar outfit was also improved, with Type 281 radar air warning radar replacing the Type 279 radar, with Type 285 radar and Type 284 radar also fitted. When the ship was repaired in early 1943, the pom-poms were replaced by three US quadruple Mark II mounts for 40 mm Bofors guns, the first use of the US quadruple Bofors mount in a British ship, while seven of the single Oerlikon cannon were replaced by six twin Oerlikon, giving a total of sixteen 20mm cannon.

== History ==
=== Mediterranean ===
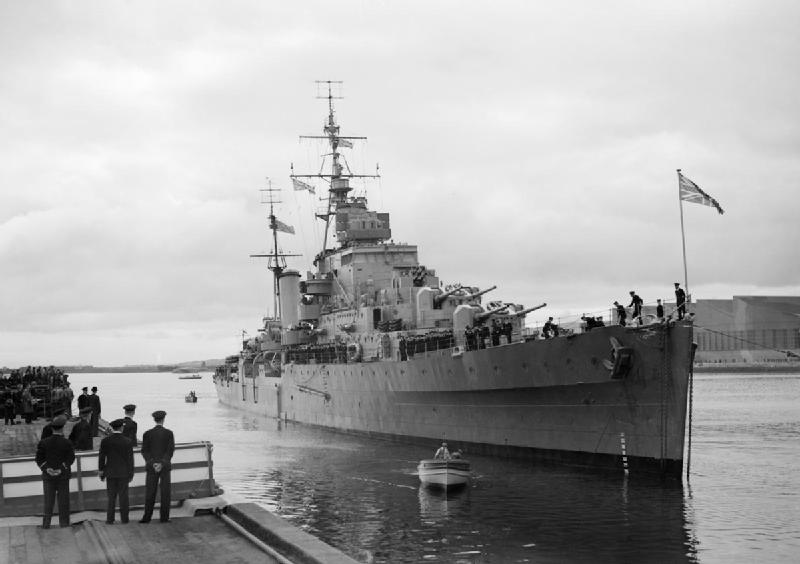
Phoebe with HM King George VI and HM Queen Elizabeth on board, coming alongside the quay at Belfast in 1942.

Following commissioning Phoebe joined the 15th Cruiser Squadron of the Home Fleet, carrying out commerce protection duties in the North Atlantic. In November 1940, following the breakout of the German cruiser Admiral Scheer into the Atlantic, Phoebe, together with sister ships Dido and Naiad and the battlecruisers Hood, Renown and Repulse to block the approaches to the German-occupied French Atlantic ports. In April 1941 she joined the Mediterranean Fleet based at Alexandria, as part of the 7th Cruiser Squadron.

On 18 April 1941, Phoebe left Alexandria with most of the Mediterranean Fleet in an operation which saw Phoebe and the cruiser Calcutta rendezvous with a convoy of four merchant ships outbound from Malta and escort them back to Alexandria (Convoy ME.2), while other units of the fleet bombarded Tripoli, Libya, and a single supply ship made passage from Alexandria to Malta. Phoebe joined up with the convoy on 20 April and escorted it back to Egypt. From 24 April 1941, Phoebe took part in Operation Demon, the evacuation of British and Empire troops from Greece. On the night of 24/25 April, she took part in embarkations from beaches at Nafplio and on 26/27 April, took part in embarkations from Kalamata. On 27 April 1941 Phoebe and the destroyers Defender, Hereward, and Hero rescued all the crew and all 2,600 soldiers from the Dutch troop ship Costa Rica, which had been near-missed by bombs from German Junkers Ju 88 bombers and was slowly sinking. On the night of 28/29 April, Phoebe, with the cruiser Perth and several destroyers were sent to Kalamata to continue the evacuations, but fighting in Kalamata harbour caused the evacuation to be abandoned.

From 6 May 1941, Phoebe took part on Operation Tiger, when in a series of interlocking operations, a convoy (the Tiger convoy) carrying tanks and aircraft was run through the Mediterranean from Gibraltar to Egypt, while two convoys were sent from Egypt to Malta and Benghazi was bombarded. Phoebe formed part of the escort for the Egypt to Malta convoys, and when they reached Malta, joined up with the Egypt-bound convoy and escorted in to Alexandria. On 14 May, in anticipation of a German naval attack on Crete, Phoebe left Alexandria as part of 'Force A', which was tasked with supporting operations to intercept any forces approaching Crete, but a fault forced the cruiser to return to Alexandria on 15 April. On 20 May, German forces launched an invasion of Crete by airborne troops, and by 27 May, with the situation on Crete critical, evacuation of the allied forces from Crete was ordered. On the night of 29/30 April, Phoebe, together with the cruisers Perth, Calcutta and Coventry, the landing ship Glengyle and the destroyers Jervis, Janus and Hasty picked up about 6,000 men from Sfakia. On the night of 31 May/1 June, Phoebe, together with the fast minelayer Abdiel, and the destroyers Jackal, Kimberley and Hotspur carried out a final evacuation from Sfakia, picking up about 4,000 men.

In June 1941, Phoebe, as part of the 15th Cruiser Squadron, took part in the Syria–Lebanon campaign, supporting the 7th Australian Division as it advanced along the coast. On 7–8 June, Phoebe supported landings north of Tyre, Lebanon. On 3 July 1941, Phoebe was attacked by the Italian submarine Malachite off the coast of North Africa, but the torpedoes missed. On the evening of 27 August 1941, Phoebe was hit by a torpedo from an Italian SM.79 Sparviero torpedo bomber while covering a transport run to besieged Tobruk. The torpedo blew a 28 ft × 18 ft (8.5 m × 5.5 m) hole in the ship's bottom, causing serious flooding. Temporary repairs were made at Alexandria and the cruiser then left to New York for permanent repairs and refit, which were made between 21 November 1941 and 21 April 1942, with the ship returning to service in May 1942.

=== Return to service ===
On 24 June 1942, Phoebe transported King George VI and Queen Elizabeth to Belfast in Northern Ireland, where the Royals inspected American troops. From 10 August 1942, Phoebe took part in Operation Pedestal, a convoy to deliver vitally needed supplies to Malta from Gibraltar, as part of the covering force. On 12 August, when the covering force was preparing to turn back to Gibraltar, the convoy came under heavy air attack. Phoebe was acting as close anti-aircraft escort to the carrier Indomitable, but the attention of the cruiser's gunners was concentrated on a formation of Italian S.79 torpedo bombers which was working its way around the convoy in preparation for an attack, when German Junkers Ju 87 dive bombers attacked Indomitable, hitting the carrier three times and wrecking the ship's flight deck. The cover force, including Phoebe, returned to Gibraltar by 15 August.

In September 1942, Phoebe and sister ship Sirius were ordered to patrol to the south of the Cape of Good Hope in order to intercept enemy blockade runners, but these efforts proved unsuccessful. On 23 October 1942, Phoebe was torpedoed by the German submarine U-161 off Pointe Noire, French Equatorial Africa (now in the Republic of the Congo). The torpedo struck adjacent to "Q" turret, blowing a 40 ft × 30 ft (12.2 m × 9.1 m) hole in the ship's side and causing extensive flooding. 42 crew members were killed. After temporary repairs at Pointe Noir, which continued until December 1942, Phoebe made passage for the US for repair, via Takoradi, Ghana and Trinidad, under escort of the sloop Bridgewater. On 15 January 1943, Phoebe arrived at the Brooklyn Navy Yard for repairs and refit, which were not completed until June 1943.

=== 1943–44 ===
Phoebe returned to service in July 1943, and in September was attached to Plymouth Command for operations against German shipping along the coast of Brittany, known as Operation Tunnel. On the night of 5/6 September 1944, Phoebe led the destroyers Grenville and Ulster on an eastwards sweep along the coast of Brittany. No opposition was encountered either that night, or when the same three ships repeated the patrol on the nights of 6/7 September, 8/9 September and 10/11 September.

In October 1943, Phoebe returned to the Mediterranean, joining the 15th Cruiser Squadron and taking part in the Dodecanese campaign. On 15–16 October, Phoebe, together with the destroyers Faulknor and Fury searched for but failed to find a German convoy carrying supplies to Kos. On the night of 18/19 October, Phoebe shelled Kalymnos and then landed supplies on Kastellorizo. On 19 November 1943, Phoebe left Alexandria in company with the French destroyers Le Fantasque and Le Terrible for the Aegean. Later that day, they came under attack by a large force of German Junkers Ju 88 bombers. Phoebe and Le Fantasque were near missed but received no damage.

From 30 January 1944, Phoebe was deployed in support of Allied forces at Anzio, relieving (with the US cruiser Brooklyn) the cruisers Dido and Delhi. Phoebe was deployed at the roadstead off Anzio to give gunfire support from 2–4 February, and 8 February, was again deployed, with all other available ships, to give gunfire support in response to a German counter-offensive.

=== Far East ===
In March 1944, Phoebe was allocated for service with the Eastern Fleet, and was refitted at Alexandria to equip her for the fighter direction role. She arrived at Trincomalee, Ceylon on 2 June. On 25 July 1944, Phoebe took part in Operation Crimson, an attack against Sabang in Northern Sumatra, with Phoebe escorting the carriers Victorious and Illustrious as they launched air strikes against airfields, with Phoebe then shelling shore targets. From 15 to 19 October 1944, Phoebe took part in Operation Millet, a series of attacks against targets in the Nicobar Islands, intended to divert Japanese attention from the American landings in the Philippines, with the cruiser escorting Victorious and Indomitable.

In January 1945, she was switched to supporting amphibious operations in Burma and was engaged in actions against Akyab, Ramree Island off the Arakan Coast, and Cheduba Island. From April to May 1945, Phoebe was involved in the amphibious assault on Rangoon as part of the East Indies Fleet's 21st Aircraft Carrier Squadron.

=== Post war ===
After VJ-Day, Phoebe returned home for refitting and spent five years in the peacetime Mediterranean Fleet. In early 1948, the cruiser took elements of Royal Marines 40 Commando to Haifa, to assist in the British withdrawal from Mandatory Palestine. On 30 June Phoebe embarked the last GOC Palestine and rearguard troops, as the evacuation was completed. After a period in reserve she was sold for scrap in 1956.
