= HMS Bonaventure (31) =

WWII-era light cruiser of the Royal Navy

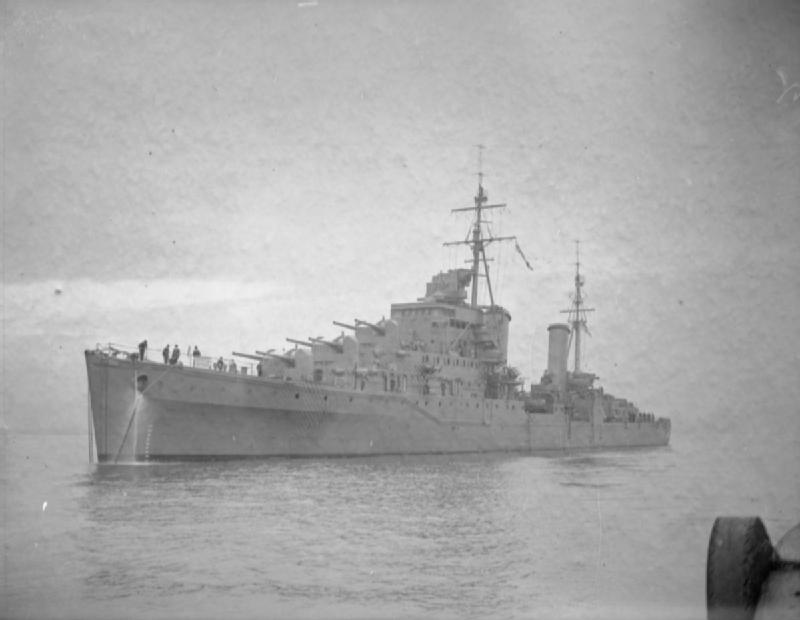
- Bonaventure at her mooring, 1940

History

United Kingdom
- Name: Bonaventure
- Builder: Scotts Shipbuilding and Engineering Company, Greenock, Scotland
- Laid down: 30 August 1937
- Launched: 19 April 1939
- Commissioned: 24 May 1940
- Identification: Pennant number 31
- Fate: Torpedoed by the Italian submarine Ambra, 31 March 1941

General characteristics
- Class & type: Dido-class light cruiser
- Displacement: 5,530 long tons (5,620 t) (standard)
- Length: 512 ft (156 m) (o/a)
- Beam: 50 ft 6 in (15.39 m)
- Draught: 14 ft (4.3 m)
- Installed power: 4 × Admiralty 3-drum boilers; 62,000 shp (46,000 kW)
- Propulsion: 4 × shafts; 4 × geared steam turbines
- Speed: 32.25 knots (59.73 km/h; 37.11 mph)
- Range: 4,240 nautical miles (7,850 km; 4,880 mi) at 16 knots (30 km/h; 18 mph)
- Complement: 487
- Sensors & processing systems: Type 279 early-warning radar
- Armament: 4 × twin 5.25 in (133 mm) DP guns; 1 × single 4 in (102 mm) star shell gun; 2 × quadruple 2 pdr (40 mm (1.6 in)) AA guns; 2 × triple 21 in (533 mm) torpedo tubes
- Armour: Belt: 3 in (7.6 cm); Deck: 1 in (2.5 cm); Magazines: 2 in (5.1 cm)

HMS Bonaventure was the lead ship of the Dido-class light cruisers built for the Royal Navy (RN) during the 1930s and during the Second World War. Completed in 1940, Bonaventure was assigned to the Home Fleet and participated in Operation Fish, the evacuation of British wealth from Britain to Canada in July. The ship made one short patrol in August into the North Atlantic to search for German blockade runners and followed that by escorting an aircraft carrier as it conducted air strikes in Southern Norway in September.

The next month she provided cover for anti-shipping raids off the Norwegian coast. Bonaventure participated in the abortive search for the German commerce raider Admiral Scheer in November and sustained weather damage that caused her to spend time in a dockyard for repairs. She was part of the escort for Convoy WS 5A in December and helped to drive off a German commerce raider. While searching for stragglers from the convoy, the cruiser sank a German blockade runner.

Bonaventure took part in Operation Excess, a convoy to Malta in January 1941 and helped to sink an Italian torpedo boat as the convoy approached Malta. She transferred to the Mediterranean Fleet for operations in the Eastern Mediterranean, the ship escorted convoys. She participated in Operation Abstention, a failed invasion of Kastelorizo in the Dodecanese in February. Bonaventure escorted convoys from Egypt to Greece in early March and one to Malta. On return to Egypt, she escorted a convoy from Greece and was sunk by an Italian submarine on 31 March with the loss of 139 men.

== Design and description ==
The Dido-class were designed as small cruisers capable of being built quickly and in large numbers to meet the Royal Navy's requirements. The small size and limited displacement of the ships precluded the mixed armament of single-purpose 6-inch (152 mm) low-angle (anti-ship) and 4-inch (102 mm) high-angle (anti-aircraft) guns carried by previous light cruisers so the Board of Admiralty decided to fit a dual-purpose main armament, capable of engaging both surface targets and aircraft. The Didos had an overall length of 512 feet (156.1 m), a beam of 50 feet 6 inches (15.4 m) and a draught of 16 feet 10 inches (5 m) at deep load. Bonaventure displaced 5,530 long tons (5,620 t) at standard load and 6,940 long tons (7,050 t) at deep load.

To improve survivability the propulsion machinery was grouped into two separate units, each consisting of one boiler room and an engine room. The ships were powered by four Parsons geared steam turbines, each driving one shaft using steam provided by four Admiralty 3-drum boilers. The turbines developed a total of 62,000 shaft horsepower (46,000 kW) and gave a designed speed of 32.25 knots (59.73 km/h; 37.11 mph) at standard load. Bonaventure reached a speed of 30.5 knots (56.5 km/h; 35.1 mph) from 63,000 shp (47,000 kW) during her sea trials in May 1940, although she displaced 6,400 long tons (6,500 t) during the testing. The Dido class carried enough fuel oil to give them a range of 4,240 nautical miles (7,850 km; 4,880 mi) at 16 knots (30 km/h; 18 mph). The ships' complement was 487 officers and ratings.

=== Armament, Fire control and sensors, and protection ===
The main armament of the Dido's was intended to consist of ten 5.25-inch (133 mm) guns in five superfiring twin-gun turrets on the ship's centreline, with three turrets forward of the superstructure and two aft, designated 'A', 'B', 'Q', 'X' and 'Y' from bow to stern. Production difficulties with the turrets forced the navy to substitute a 4-inch (102 mm) Mk V star shell gun for 'X' turret on Bonaventure. Two quadruple two-pounder (40 mm (1.6 in)) AA gun mounts were positioned just forward of the aft funnel, one on each broadside to provide close-in anti-aircraft protection, backed up by two quadruple Vickers 0.50-inch (12.7 mm) machine gun mounts on the bridge wings. Two triple 21-inch (533 mm) rotating torpedo tube mounts, one on each broadside abaft the aft funnel, provided additional anti-ship capability.

Forward fire control for this armament was provided by a single low-angle director control tower (DCT), together with a High Angle Control System (HACS) director tower above the ship's bridge. Aft was a single dual-purpose DCT that incorporated a HACS. Bonaventure was equipped with a Type 279 early-warning radar. She was intended to be fitted with a Type 128A ASDIC, but none were available when the ship was completed.

A 3-inch (76 mm) waterline armour belt protected the ship's propulsion machinery and magazines with 1 inch (25 mm) protecting the shell rooms. The upper and lower decks were also an inch thick, with the roofs of the magazines protected by 2-inch (51 mm) plates. The turret faces had armour 1.5 inches (38 mm) thick while the rest of the turret had 1-inch plates. The barbettes were protected by 0.5-to-0.75-inch (13 to 19 mm) armour.

== Construction and career ==
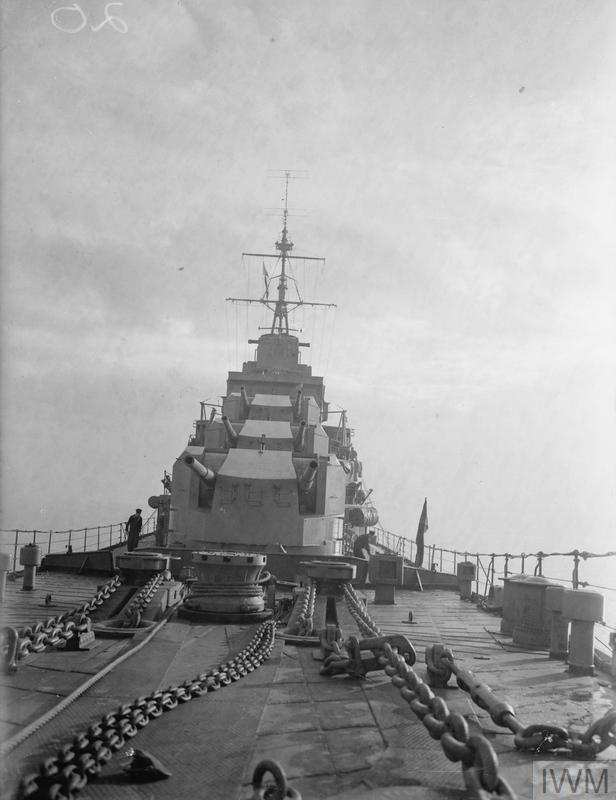
A view of Bonaventure's forward gun turrets and bridge from the bow, 1940

Bonaventure, the seventh ship of her name to serve in the RN, was ordered as part of the 1936 Naval Programme from Scotts Shipbuilding & Engineering and was laid down on 30 August 1937 at their Greenock shipyard. The ship was launched on 19 April 1939 and completed on 24 May 1940. She was assigned to the Home Fleet after working up and was tasked to help ferry the Bank of England's gold reserves and securities to Canada in early July. Bonaventure, laden with £25 million in bullion and coin, departed the Firth of Clyde early on 8 July in company with the battleship HMS Revenge and rendezvoused with three ocean liners also carrying gold later that morning in the Irish Sea. The Polish liner MV Batory began to have engine troubles as the convoy was approaching the coast of Canada and the cruiser was detailed to escort her to St. John's and then to rendezvous with the rest of the convoy at Halifax where she arrived on 13 July.

On 15 August 1940, Bonaventure and her sister ship Naiad began a five-day patrol off the Faroe Islands in an unsuccessful search for German blockade runners. The two cruisers were among the escorts for the aircraft carrier Furious as her aircraft attempted to find and attack German shipping off Trondheim, Norway, on 6–7 September. A week later the sisters helped to escort the battlecruiser Hood and the battleship Nelson as the Home Fleet commander, Admiral of the Fleet Charles Forbes decided to transfer the main body of the Home Fleet from Scapa Flow to Rosyth on 14 September. Bonaventure and Naiad conducted an unsuccessful anti-shipping raid in the Norwegian Sea on 23–24 October, during which her forecastle was damaged during heavy weather. Upon her return Bonaventure was docked at Rosyth for repairs that lasted until 2 November.

Three days later, the ship sortied in response to the attack on Convoy HX 84 by the German heavy cruiser Admiral Scheer. Along with three destroyers, she escorted the battlecruiser Repulse to the German ship's last reported position while the rest of the Home Fleet redeployed to cover convoys already at sea or to block the routes leading back to German-occupied Europe. After an unsuccessful search, the ship returned to Scapa Flow to refuel on 11 November and put back to sea to search for survivors from the armed merchant cruiser Jervis Bay and the other ships sunk by Admiral Scheer. Bonaventure failed to find any survivors before weather damage forced her to return to Scapa Flow on 19 November. The ship steamed to Rosyth to begin repairs four days later. Examination of the damage revealed that two pillars beneath the forecastle had buckled when the forecastle deck flexed as the ship pitched up and down in heavy seas and that 5.25-inch shells had been dislodged from their stowage. Coupled with the damage sustained by her sisters in similar conditions, it revealed that the measures taken to reduce weight forward in the ships were excessive and had compromised the hull's strength.

With her repairs completed on 13 December 1940, Bonaventure steamed to the Clyde three days later to serve as an escort for Convoy WS 5A bound for Egypt. The German heavy cruiser Admiral Hipper's radar spotted the convoy on 24 December and allowed for the ship to intercept the convoy the following morning despite the intermittent rain squalls and choppy seas. The German ship initially engaged the heavy cruiser Berwick at 06:39, but turned away four minutes later when Berwick returned fire as the Germans had expected a weakly escorted convoy. The two ships dueled whenever in sight for the few hours until Admiral Hipper was able to disengage at 09:14. Bonaventure was not initially in a position to engage the German cruiser, but she fired a total of 438 rounds, including some star shells, between 08:12 and 08:36 without hitting Admiral Hipper. As the convoy had been ordered to scatter after encountering Admiral Hipper, Bonaventure spent the next few days trying to locate the merchantmen, especially the troopship Empire Trooper. During this time she encountered the 8,204-long-ton (8,336 t) German blockade runner Baden and sank her with a torpedo on 26 December. Bonaventure arrived in Gibraltar three days later.

=== 1941 ===
In early January 1941, the ship was assigned to Force F which formed the close escort for four merchant ships bound for Malta and Piraeus, Greece, as part of Operation Excess. A troopship had run aground before the convoy was to depart and about four hundred troops from it were transferred to Bonaventure. The convoy steamed west when it departed on 6 January as a deception measure before turning eastward during the night and was well clear of Gibraltar when dawn broke the next morning. The cruiser was briefly detached to join Force H which provided distant cover for the convoy and rejoined it on the morning of 8 January. After the aircraft carrier Ark Royal had flown off some torpedo bombers for Malta, Force H turned back and reinforced the convoy escort during the morning of 9 January. Reinforcements from the Mediterranean Fleet arrived about an hour later in the form of the light cruisers Gloucester, Southampton and two destroyers. That afternoon the convoy and its escorts were ineffectually attacked by 10 Italian Savoia-Marchetti SM.79 bombers. British aerial reconnaissance at dusk failed to spot any Italian ships between the convoy and Malta, so Force H turned back for Gibraltar short of the Strait of Sicily with the main body of the Mediterranean Fleet scheduled to rendezvous with the convoy the following morning.

At 07:20 on 10 January the Italian torpedo boats Vega and Circe were simultaneously spotted by Bonaventure and the destroyer Jaguar about 12 nmi (22 km; 14 mi) off the island of Pantelleria despite the poor visibility. Bonaventure opened fire with a star shell to better identify the targets and switched to high-explosive shells once they had been recognized as Italians. She evaded torpedoes fired by one or both of the torpedo boats, although the ship was damaged by splinters before Southampton opened fire at 07:53. The two cruisers crippled Vega, although Circe was able to escape. The destroyer Hereward delivered the coup de grâce with a torpedo not long afterwards.

Shortly after the Mediterranean Fleet joined up with the convoy, the destroyer Gallant had her bow blown off by a mine at 08:34 and was taken in tow stern-first by the destroyer Mohawk for repairs at Malta. As Bonaventure, Southampton, Gloucester and the destroyer Griffin were moving to rendezvous with the two destroyers, Bonaventure was unsuccessfully attacked by two Italian torpedo bombers at 09:20. The group was repeatedly attacked by small groups of bombers from 11:30 to 18:00, which only damaged Southampton's ASDIC dome. They reached Malta on 11 January where Bonaventure unloaded her passengers. Now assigned to the Mediterranean Fleet, the ship arrived at Alexandria, Egypt, on 16 January. Two days later she was part of the cover force for a bombardment mission on Italian positions near Tobruk, Libya. Bad weather postponed the bombardment and the cover force was ordered to Suda Bay, Crete, where Bonaventure and the light cruiser Ajax escorted convoy AN 12 through the Strait of Kasos between the Sea of Crete and the Eastern Mediterranean on 21–22 January. The following day the cruiser was part of a cover force for the badly damaged aircraft carrier Illustrious's movement from Malta to Alexandria.

Bonaventure was part of a diversionary operation by the Mediterranean Fleet on 1–3 February intended to distract the Axis forces from an operation by Force H in the Western Mediterranean. The ship returned to Suda Bay on 8 February, making patrols in Greek waters and covering the occupation of Castelorizo (Operation Abstention) for the rest of the month. From 6 to 10 March, she ferried troops from Alexandria to Piraeus and then returned to Suda Bay to conduct patrols and cover convoys in the Aegean Sea before arriving in Alexandria on 18 March. Two days later Bonaventure put to sea to rendezvous with four merchantmen bound for Malta as part of Operation MC 9. Together with four destroyers, the cruiser formed the close escort for the convoy and were designated as Force C. Bonaventure was attacked without effect by a pair of German Junkers Ju 88 bombers on 21 March. The convoy reached Malta two days later without further attacks. The cruiser was attacked by 15 German Junkers Ju 87 dive bombers that afternoon, but only suffered some splinter damage. Force C departed later that day and arrived in Alexandria on 25 March.

Bonaventure and two destroyers were ordered to join the Mediterranean Fleet on the afternoon of 28 March, as the British were in the middle of fighting the Italian Fleet during the Battle of Cape Matapan. They caught up to them at 10:00 the following day, after the British had decisively defeated the Italian Navy. The cruiser was ordered to join the escort of Convoy GA 8 which was bound for Alexandria from Piraeus and rendezvoused with them at 08:00 the following morning. The ship was unsuccessfully attacked by the Italian submarine Dagabur about 20:30. At about 02:55 on the morning of 31 March 1941, Bonaventure was hit amidships on the starboard side by two torpedoes fired by the Italian submarine Ambra. The first torpedo struck at the aft end of the forward engine room and the second detonated abreast the aft engine room, destroying the aft watertight transverse bulkhead and exposing 'X' magazine to the open sea. The consequent flooding caused a severe list to starboard within minutes and the ship capsized within six minutes of the attack south of Crete at coordinates (33°20′N 26°35′E) with the loss of 139 of her 480 crew. 310 survivors were rescued by Hereward and the Australian destroyer Stuart. She was the largest warship sunk by an Italian submarine in World War II.
