= HMS Euryalus (42) =

Cruiser of the Royal Navy

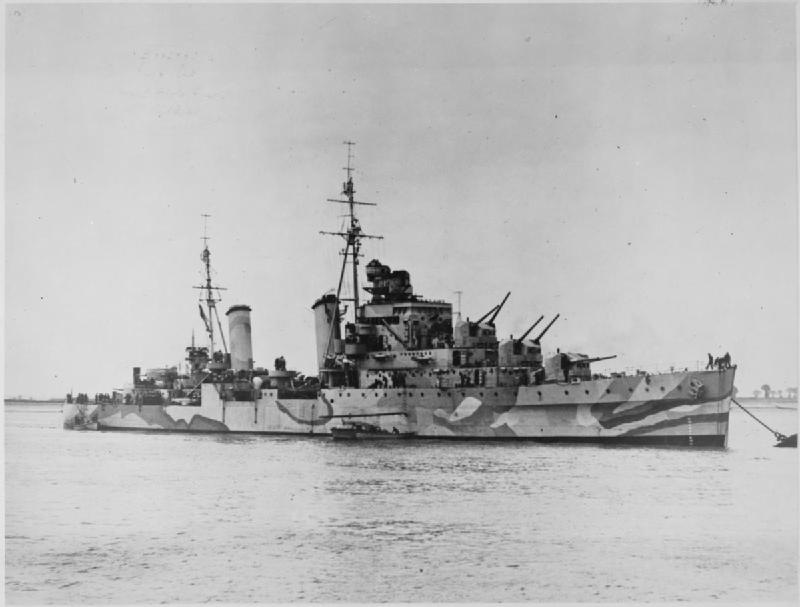
- Euryalus at a buoy on completion, June 1941

History

United Kingdom
- Name: Euryalus
- Builder: Chatham Dockyard
- Laid down: 21 October 1937
- Launched: 6 June 1939
- Commissioned: 30 June 1941
- Decommissioned: 19 September 1954
- Fate: Scrapped, 18 July 1959

General characteristics (as built)
- Class & type: Dido-class light cruiser
- Displacement: 5,600 tons standard; 6,850 tons full load
- Length: 485 ft (148 m) pp; 512 ft (156 m) oa
- Beam: 50.5 ft (15.4 m)
- Draught: 14 ft (4.3 m)
- Propulsion: Parsons geared turbines; Four shafts; Four Admiralty 3-drum boilers; 62,000 shp (46,000 kW)
- Speed: 32.25 knots (60 km/h)
- Range: 1,303 nmi (2,414 km) at 30 kn (56 km/h; 35 mph); 3,685 nmi (6,824 km) at 16 kn (30 km/h; 18 mph)
- Complement: 480
- Armament: 5 × twin 5.25-inch (133 mm) guns; 1 × 4-inch (102 mm) gun; 2 × quad 0.5-inch (12.7 mm) machine guns, 3 × quad 2-pounder (40 mm) pom-pom guns, 2 × triple 21-inch (533 mm) torpedo tubes.
- Armor: Belt: 3 in (76 mm); Deck: 1 in (25 mm); Magazines: 2 in (51 mm); Bulkheads: 1 in (25 mm)
- Notes: Pennant number 42

HMS Euryalus was a Dido-class cruiser of the Royal Navy. She was laid down at Chatham Dockyard on 21 October 1937, launched on 6 June 1939, and commissioned 30 June 1941. Euryalus was the last cruiser built at the dockyard.

== Mediterranean service ==
=== Malta convoys ===
On 17 September 1941 Euryalus joined the escort for convoy WS 11X from Glasgow to Gibraltar. From 24 to 30 September 1941 she was part of Operation Halberd, one of the Malta Convoys. Nine fast freighters, escorted by the battleships HMS Prince of Wales, HMS Nelson and HMS Rodney, the aircraft carrier HMS Ark Royal, cruisers HMS Kenya, HMS Edinburgh, HMS Sheffield, HMS Euryalus and HMS Hermione, and eighteen destroyers sailed from Gibraltar. Two days later the force was spotted by Italian scout planes. Italian air attacks launched from Sardinia began on 27 September. The battleship Nelson was hit by a torpedo north of the Galite Islands. That evening the freighter Imperial Star was sunk north of Cap Bon. On 1 October Euryalus became part of Force W at Gibraltar.

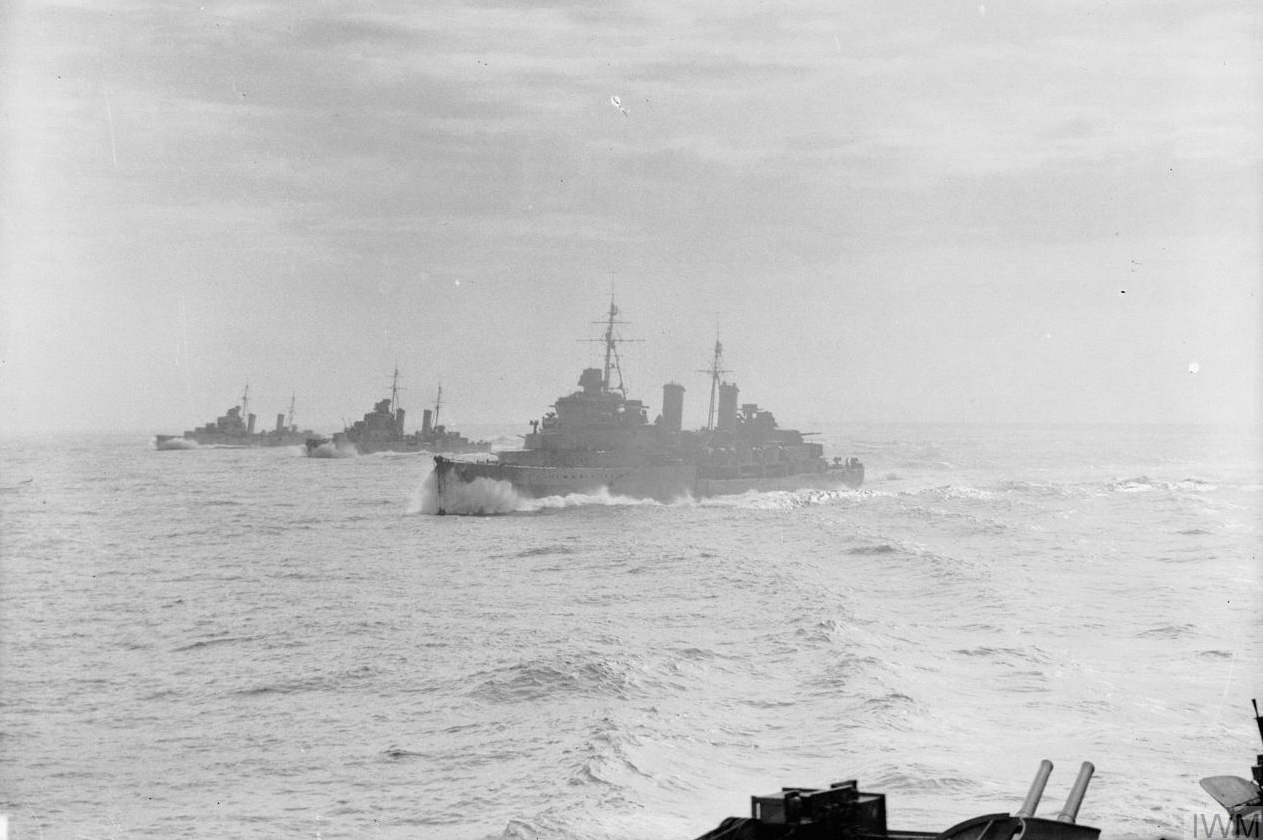
The cruisers HMS Edinburgh, HMS Hermione, and HMS Euryalus, steaming in line abreast whilst they escort a convoy as part of Operation Halberd, – convoy not visible.

Euryalus joined the 15th Cruiser Squadron at Alexandria on 11 November 1941 for service with the Mediterranean Fleet. On 24 November she deployed with Force B, including the cruisers HMS Ajax, HMS Galatea, HMS Naiad and HMS Neptune, to search for convoys on passage to Benghazi. On 15 December 1941 Euryalus, Naiad and eight destroyers deployed from Alexandria under Rear-Admiral Philip Vian as an escort for the freighter MV Breconshire, bound for Malta. On 17 December Vian's force rendezvoused with Force K from Malta, and a brief engagement took place with units of the Italian fleet. Euryalus and the rest of the squadron sailed for Alexandria the following day.

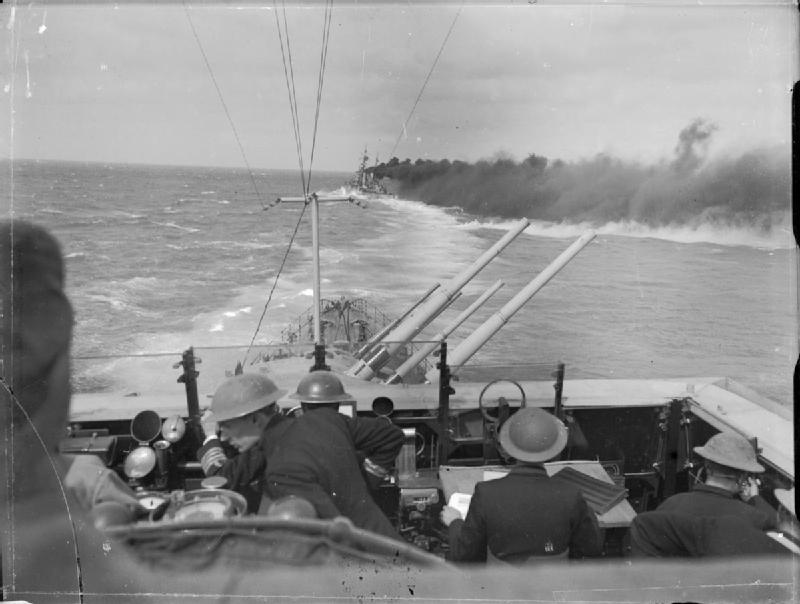
HMS Cleopatra throws out smoke to shield the convoy as HMS Euryalus elevates her forward 5.25-inch guns to shell the Italian Fleet at the Second Battle of Sirte, 22 March 1942

On 12 February 1942 Euryalus was part of Vian's Force B deployed to cover Convoy MW 9, with HMS Naiad, HMS Dido and eight destroyers. The convoy came under heavy German air attack on 14 February, and the merchant ship Clan Chattan was scuttled. Vian's ships returned to Alexandria on the morning of 15 February. On 22 March 1942 she was involved in the Second Battle of Sirte. From 12 to 16 June 1942 Euryalus was part of Operation Vigorous, another Malta supply convoy, starting at Alexandria, Port Said and Haifa. The escorting force included the old battleship HMS Centurion, the cruisers HMS Cleopatra (flagship of Rear-Admiral Vian), HMS Dido, HMS Hermione, HMS Euryalus, HMS Arethusa, HMS Newcastle (flagship of Rear-Admiral W. G. Tennant), HMS Birmingham, the anti-air cruiser HMS Coventry, 19 destroyers, 9 escort destroyers, 4 corvettes, 2 minesweepers, 2 tugs and 4 motor torpedo boats. On 16 June HMS Hermione was sunk by the U-boat U-205.

On 23 January 1943 Euryalus, in company with HMS Cleopatra and the destroyers HMS Jervis, HMS Nubian and HMS Kelvin bombarded German-Italian forces at Zuara.

=== Invasion of Sicily ===
On 10 July 1943 Euryalus was part of Operation Husky, the allied amphibious landings on Sicily. In this time join the 12th cruiser squadron with HMS Aurora, HMS Penelope, HMS Cleopatra, HMS Sirius and HMS Dido. For the operation Euryalus was assigned was to cover the attacking forces, together with other elements of Force H, under Vice-Admiral Algernon Willis. Willis's force consisted of four battleships, the aircraft carriers HMS Formidable and HMS Indomitable and three destroyer flotillas with 18 destroyers. The reserve force comprised the battleships HMS Howe, HMS King George V and six destroyers. The invasion was further supported by three monitors, four cruisers, four AA ships, 47 destroyers, 20 submarines, 327 landing ships and 715 landing boats of all kinds, 296 minor vessels and 155 transport vessels. The United States Navy deployed five cruisers, 48 destroyers, 190 landing ships, 510 landing boats, 510 other vessels and 66 transport vessels, with a further 31 warships from the Netherlands, Poland, Belgium, Norway and Greece.

=== Operation Avalanche ===
HMS Euryalus was involved in Operation Avalanche, the amphibious landings at Salerno on 9 September 1943 as part of Rear-Admiral Vian's Task Force 88. The Task Force covered the landing area with the aircraft carrier HMS Unicorn, the escort carriers HMS Attacker, HMS Battler, HMS Hunter and HMS Stalker, the cruisers HMS Scylla, HMS Euryalus, HMS Charybdis, eight British destroyers, and the Polish escort destroyer ORP Krakowiak.

== Service in the Far East ==
Euryalus joined the 4th Cruiser Squadron at Trincomalee, Ceylon in January 1945, becoming part of the British Eastern Fleet. On 24 January she took part in Operation Meridian I, covering carrier-launched attacks on refineries at Pladjoe, Sumatra. On 2 February Euryalus arrived at Fremantle, Australia, to transfer to the British Pacific Fleet (BPF).

=== British Pacific Fleet ===
Euryalus arrived at Sydney on 11 February 1945. She sailed from there on 28 February to the British Forward Base at Manus, where she joined the British Pacific Fleet on arrival on 7 March. There the fleet awaited the approval of the US Chiefs of Staff for Royal Navy ships to join US Navy operations in the south-west Pacific. On 17 March Euryalus sailed for the US Navy Assembly area at Ulithi to join in USN operations. She arrived there on 20 March arrived and joined the United States Fifth Fleet for operations against Japan and the Imperial Japanese Navy (IJN). On 23 March she sailed from Ulithi as part of CTU 6 with the 25th, 27th and 4th RAN destroyer flotillas to join US operations off the Sakishima Gunto islands group, as part of Operation Iceberg 1. On 1 April she transferred with the Task Force 57 carriers to cover air attacks on Formosa. On 12 April, as part of Operation Iceberg Oolong, she provided covered during attacks on Shinchiku and Matsugama. The next day Euryalus rejoined US ships off Sakishima Gunto. She deployed with Task Force 57 during the final strike of Phase 1 of the Sakishima Gunto attacks. On 1 May she rejoined US Task Force 45 with Task Force 57 carriers to continue the attacks on Sakishima Gunto. Three days later Operation Iceberg 2 began, resuming the attacks on Sakishima Gunto.

On 27 May Euryalus, with the other ships of the Royal Navy, transferred to US Task Force 37, as changes were made in the organisation of the US Fleet. She was at Brisbane on 4 June for repair and maintenance, then sailed to Manus. From Manus she sailed on 6 July for operations in preparation for Operation Olympic, the invasion of Japan. On 17 July she deployed with Task Force 37, joining ships of US Task Force 38 to provide cover during air attacks on targets in the Tokyo – Yokohama area, including airfields and the seaplane base at Kitaura. On 24 July she covered Task Force 37 carriers during air attacks on Osaka and Katori as well as attacks on shipping. On 9 August she covered the same Task Force during attacks on airfields and shipping in north Honshu and Hokkaido. On 12 August she took passage to Manus due to a shortage of fuel oil from British support tankers.

Euryalus transferred back to Royal Navy control on 15 August, after the surrender of Japan. She arrived back at Manus on 18 August and on 27 August sailed as TU.111.2 with the carriers HMS Indomitable and HMS Venerable, the cruisers HMS Swiftsure, HMS Black Prince, and the destroyers HMS Kempenfelt, HMS Ursa and HMS Whirlwind for the reoccupation of Hong Kong. On 29 August 1945 she entered Hong Kong with HMS Swiftsure and the landing ship HMCS Prince Robert.

=== Post-war service ===
Euryalus was the last original Dido operational in Royal Navy, until 1954, mainly on the South Atlantic station. The ship was the most modernised of the original Didos, having been extensively updated from October 1943 to June 1944 at John Brown on the Clyde with new light anti-aircraft armament of 20 mm, 40 mm and 2-pounder mountings and a generally new radar suite with Type 293 radar the standard post-war Royal Navy target indicator and close-range air and surface search, Type 272 heightfinders and surface warning and new navigation radar. After the end of World War II Euryalus spent 18 further months in the Pacific Fleet operating from Sydney, Japan and Hong Kong before returning to the UK for a year-long modernisation at Rosyth in 1947–48. By this time the long range airwarning radar on Euryalus was the late war Type 279b/281, the precursor of the post-1945, Type 960. Photos reveal that Euryalus's 5.25-inch (133 mm) turrets were also modified externally in the same way as Vanguard's and Royalist's with the insertion in the turret for operators of a large Perspex sighting windows. In the early 1950s a major modernisation was planned for Dido-class cruisers Phoebe, Diadem and Cleopatra, refitting them in a similar pattern to HMS Royalist with the further improvement of new boilers, similar to those of the Daring class. The $4.5 million cost of Royalist's update to a 1950s fleet picket standard ruled this out.
