= Dido-class cruiser =

Class of light cruisers built for the Royal Navy

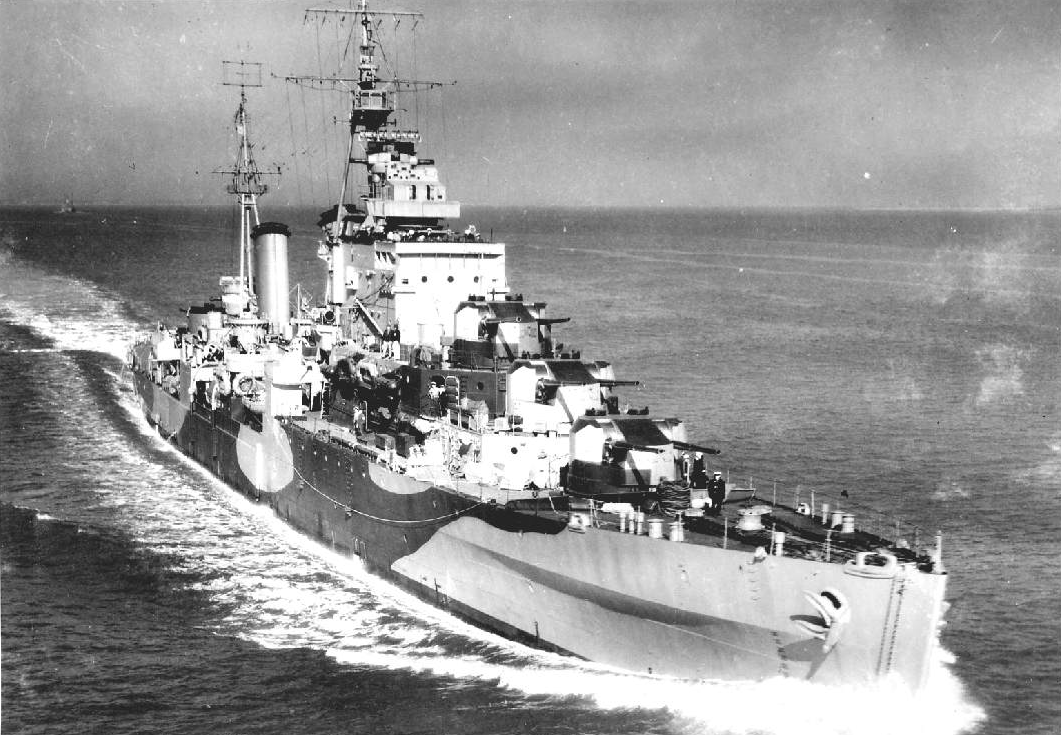
- Argonaut in wartime camouflage, November 1943 just after repairs at the Philadelphia Navy Yard

Class overview
- Name: Dido class
- Builders: Alexander Stephens and Sons (1); Cammell Laird (3); Chatham Dockyard (1); Fairfield Shipbuilding (2); Harland and Wolff (1); Portsmouth Dockyard (1); Hawthorn Leslie (3); Scotts Shipbuilding (3); Vickers Armstrongs (1)
- Operators: Royal Navy; Royal New Zealand Navy; Pakistan Navy
- Preceded by: Arethusa class
- Succeeded by: Fiji class
- Subclasses: Dido; Bellona
- Built: 1937–1943
- In commission: 1940–1980s
- Completed: 16
- Lost: 5
- Scrapped: 11

General characteristics (as built)
- Type: Light cruiser
- Displacement: 5,521–5,770 long tons (5,610–5,863 t) (standard); 7,081–7,420 long tons (7,195–7,539 t) (full load)
- Length: 512 ft (156.1 m) (o/a)
- Beam: 50 ft 6 in (15.4 m)
- Draught: Dido class: 16 ft 10 in (5.1 m) (deep load); Bellona class: 17 ft 9 in (5.4 m) (deep load)
- Installed power: 4 Admiralty 3-drum boilers; 62,000 shp (46,000 kW)
- Propulsion: 4 shafts; 4 steam turbines
- Speed: 32.25 knots (59.73 km/h; 37.11 mph)
- Range: 4,850 nmi (8,980 km; 5,580 mi) at 11 knots (20 km/h; 13 mph)
- Complement: Dido class: 487; Bellona class: 530
- Sensors & processing systems: Type 128 ASDIC; Type 279 early-warning radar
- Armament: Dido class as designed: 5 × twin 5.25 in (133 mm) guns; 2 × quadruple 2-pdr (40 mm (1.6 in)) AA guns; 4 × twin 0.5 in (12.7 mm) AA machine guns; 2 × triple 21 in (533 mm) torpedo tubes; Bellona class as designed: 4 × twin 5.25 in guns; 3 × quadruple 2 pdr AA guns; 6 × twin 20 mm (0.8 in) AA guns; 2 × triple 21 in torpedo tubes

The Dido class consisted of sixteen light cruisers built for the Royal Navy during World War II. The first group of three ships were commissioned in 1940; the second group of six ships and third group of two were commissioned between 1941 and 1942. A fourth group, also described as the Improved Dido or Bellona class (five ships) were commissioned between 1943 and 1944. Most members of the class were given names drawn from classical history and legend. The groups differed in armament, and for the Bellonas, in function. The Dido class were designed to replace the C-class and D-class cruisers as small fleet cruisers and flotilla leaders for the destroyer screen. As designed, they mounted five twin 5.25-inch high-angle gun turrets on the centreline providing dual-purpose anti-air and anti-surface capacity; the complex new turrets were unreliable when introduced, and somewhat unsatisfactory at a time when the UK faced a fight for survival.

During the war, the original 1939–42 ships required extensive refit work to increase electrical generating capacity for additional wartime systems (notably radar and gun direction equipment) and in the final Bellona, HMS Diadem, fully-electric turrets. While some damage was experienced initially in extreme North Atlantic weather, changes to gun handling and drill partially mitigated the problems. The fitting of the three forward turrets in the double-superfiring A-B-C arrangement (although in Royal Navy classification, fifth turrets were called "Q", not "C") relied upon the heavy use of aluminium in the ships' superstructure, and the lack of aluminium after the evacuation of the British Army from France was one of the primary reasons for the first group only receiving four turrets, while the third group received four twin 4.5-inch mounts and no 5.25-inch guns at all. The Bellonas were designed from the start with four radar-directed 5.25-inch gun turrets with full Remote Power Control and an expanded light anti-aircraft battery, substantially increasing their efficiency as AA platforms.

From the initial trials of the lead ship Bonaventure, the new light cruisers were considered a significant advancement and were surprisingly effective in later actions in the Mediterranean Sea, such as protecting convoys to Malta, seeing off far larger ships of the Italian Royal Navy. The 5.25-inch (133 mm) gun was primarily an anti-surface weapon but designed to fire the heaviest shell suitable for manual loading for use in anti-aircraft defence, and accounted for around 23 aircraft and deterred far more. Both the Didos and Bellonas were dogged by roller path jams in the rail track upon which the turret gunhouses rotated. These issues regularly put turrets out of action from their initial sea trials until the last operational service of Euryalus and Cleopatra with the RN in 1953–54 and were the bane of the three Bellonas operated post-war by the RNZN.. The original Dido-class ships HMS Bonaventure, HMS Charybdis, HMS Hermione and HMS Naiad were lost in the war. The survivor, name ship HMS Dido, was put into reserve in 1947 and decommissioned ten years later. HMS Euryalus was the last of the original class to see service, being decommissioned in 1954 and scrapped in 1959.

The Bellona class (as well as four rebuilt Didos) were mainly intended as picket ships for amphibious warfare operations in support of aircraft carriers of the Royal Navy and United States Navy in the Pacific. HMS Spartan was the only ship of the sub-class to be sunk, struck by a German Fritz X glide bomb while supporting the landings of the Battle of Anzio. Two ships were to be modified to be command ships of aircraft carrier and cruiser groups, intended for action against planned German battlecruisers. Originally these were to be Scylla and Charybdis of the third group, but the 1943 loss of Charybdis saw Royalist of the fourth (Bellona) group selected instead; these were also known as the Modified Dido.

Post-war modernisation proposals were limited by the tight war emergency design. There was insufficient space and weight for the fire control and magazines of four or five modern twin 3-inch turrets, and the 5.25-inch shells had a much larger bursting charge than the smaller 4.5-inch guns in service post-war, making them more effective high-altitude AA weapons. HMS Royalist was rebuilt for potential action alongside the battleship HMS Vanguard against the post-war Soviet Sverdlov-class cruisers and Stalingrad-class battlecruisers and was loaned to the Royal New Zealand Navy (RNZN) from 1956 to 1966.

== Armament ==
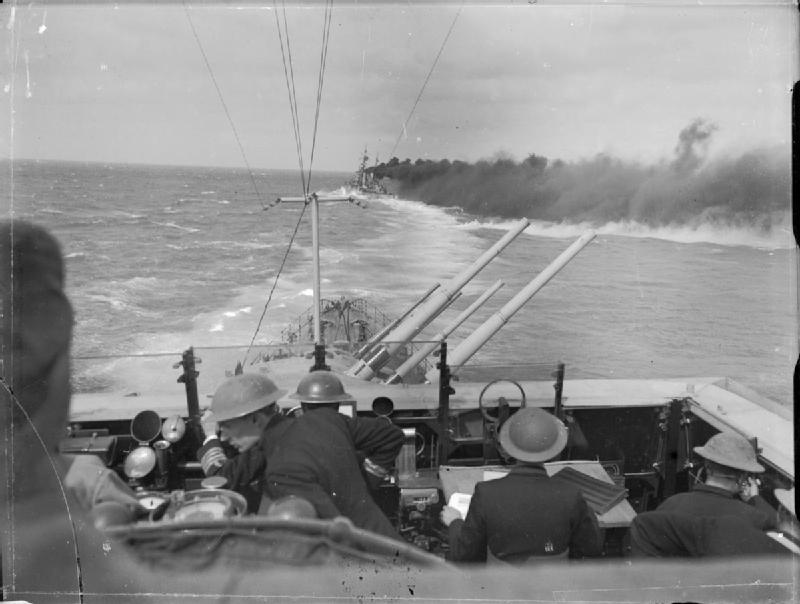
Cleopatra lays smoke to shield a convoy as Euryalus elevates her forward 5.25 inch guns to shell the Italian fleet at the Second Battle of Sirte, 22 March 1942

The class were intended to be armed with ten 5.25-inch (133 mm) guns in five twin turrets, which were of the same circular design as the secondary armament in the King George V-class battleships. Due to a shortage of the guns caused by difficulties in manufacturing them, the first group were built with only four 5.25-inch gun turrets. Only HMS Dido had the fifth turret added later. The first group was also armed with a 4 in (102 mm) gun for firing star shells and two quadruple QF 2-pounder (40 mm) "pom-poms" for anti-aircraft defence.

The second group had all five twin 5.25-inch turrets and did not require the 4-inch gun. The third group's armament was changed due to the shortage of 5.25-inch guns and had eight QF 4.5-inch (113 mm) guns in four twin turrets instead. The 4.5-inch turret was better suited to the primary anti-aircraft role of the Dido class but the ammunition was considered too heavy for peacetime use. The forward (A and B) 4.5-inch turrets were mounted on the top of conjoint deckhouses. The superstructure extended forward with more crew accommodation and radar rooms which allowed the two cruisers to operate as flagships. The high rate of fire of the 4.5-inch turrets, together with simpler dual-purpose twin Director Control Tower (DCT), (Note: Red DCT for A & B and Blue for X & Y turrets) meant that Scylla and Charybdis were arguably the only members of the Dido class that were true AA cruisers. The 4-inch gun was also fitted and the 2-pounder armament was increased from eight to ten.

The Bellona subclass differed in appearance somewhat from their predecessors. They had eight 5.25-inch RP10 Mk II guns in four twin turrets and had greatly improved anti-aircraft armament, with twelve 2-pounder guns and twelve Oerlikon 20 mm cannon. The bridge of the Bellona class was lowered by one deck compared to the previous three groups. This reduced topweight and so full radar control could be fitted to the 5.25-inch turrets and the 2-pounder guns. These ships used the HACS high angle fire control system. The two funnels were more upright than the raked ones of the original Dido class.

== Service ==
In World War II, the Dido class saw much action, including the Battle of Cape Matapan, the Second Battle of Sirte, Operation Torch, Operation Overlord and the Battle of Okinawa, as well as many other duties in the Mediterranean and Pacific. The production of the 5.25 turrets during the war and the turrets reconstruction, with remote power for faster elevation and training and better fire control was slow, difficult and expensive and largely limited to the cruisers rebuilt after severe action damage in the United States, Argonaut, Cleopatra and Phoebe. It was never completed on several Dido that survived the war. Five ships were lost during the war: Bonaventure, Charybdis, Hermione, Naiad, and Spartan. Scylla was badly damaged by a naval mine and declared a constructive total loss. The post-war survivors continued in service; all were decommissioned by the 1960s. Bellona, Black Prince and Royalist were lent to the Royal New Zealand Navy post-World War II. In 1956, Diadem was sold to Pakistan and renamed Babur.

== Ship modifications ==
=== Didos ===
Bonaventure completed with only four twin 5.25-inch turrets because of shortages and received a 4-inch starshell gun in "X" position. She received a radar set before October 1940 but was otherwise unaltered. Naiad was completed with five turrets. She received five 20 mm in September 1941 and had Type 279 radar by this time. Phoebe completed with four turrets and was fitted with a 4-inch gun in "C" position forward of the bridge. The latter was 'landed' (removed) during her refit between November 1941 and April 1942 at New York City, along with the 0.5-inch machine guns and Type 279 radar, while a quadruple 2 pdr replaced the 4-inch gun and eleven 20 mm guns were fitted. Radars were now Type 281, 284 and 285. The "A" turret was temporarily removed at the end of 1942 after torpedo damage. During repairs in the first six months of 1943, all three quadruple 2-pounder pom-pom mounts were landed, as were seven 20 mm, to be replaced by three quadruple 40 mm Bofors guns and six twin 20 mm. Radar Type 272 was also fitted. Her A turret was replaced in July 1943. Her light anti-aircraft weaponry in April 1944 was twelve 40 mm (3 × 4) and sixteen 20 mm (6 × dual, 4 × single).

Dido had four turrets and a 4-inch gun similar to Phoebe. The 4-inch and the machine guns were removed in the latter half of 1941 at Brooklyn Navy Yard, when the "Q" position 5.25-inch turret was shipped and four 20 mm were fitted, two of which replaced the original quadruple 0.5 mm machine guns. In the early summer of 1943 three 20 mm were exchanged for four twin 20 mm and the radar outfit was altered by the addition of Types 272, 282, 284 and 285. April 1944 lists show only eight 20 mm.

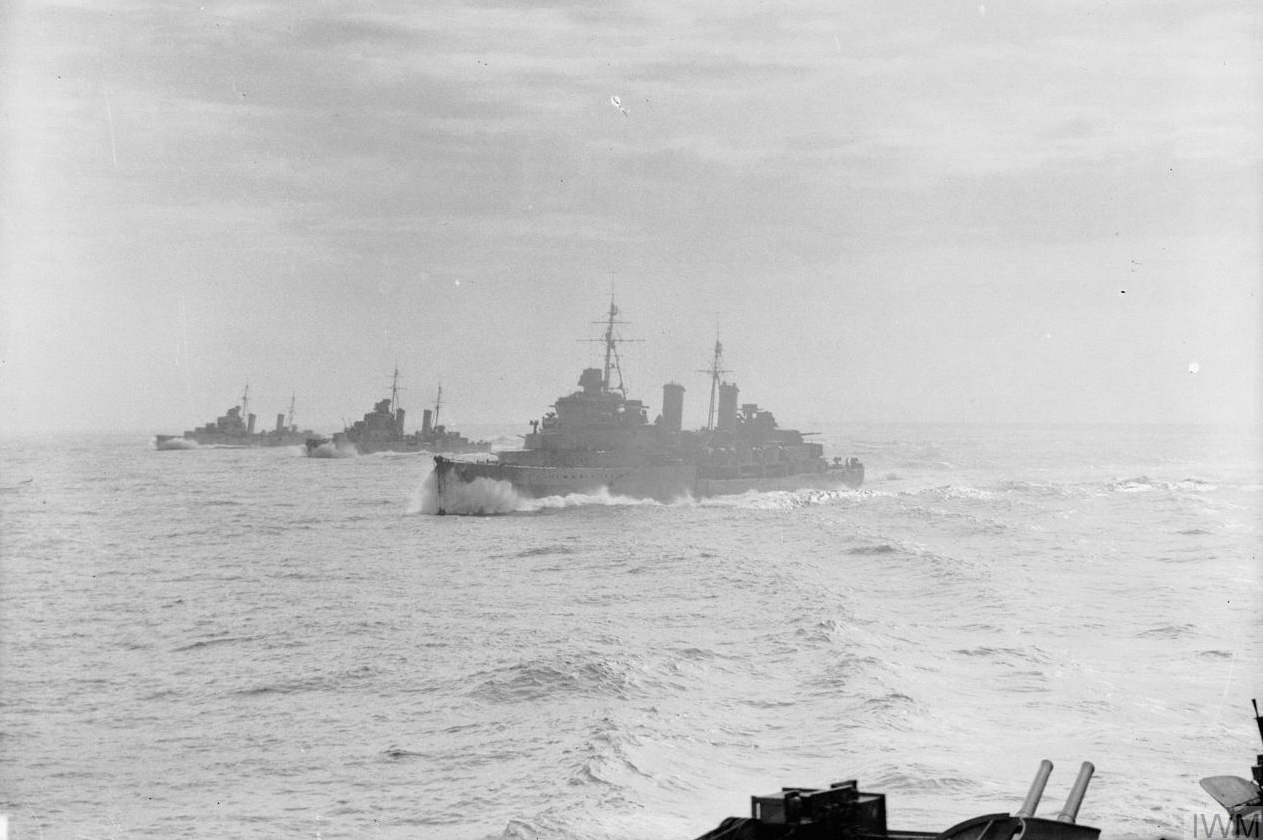
The cruisers Edinburgh, Hermione, and Euryalus, steaming in line abreast whilst they escort a convoy (not visible) as part of Operation Halberd to resupply Malta

Euryalus completed with her designed armament. In September 1941 the .5-inch machine guns were landed and five single 20 mm fitted. Two more were added by September 1942. By mid-1943 two 20 mm had been removed and four twin 20 mm shipped. The type 279 radar was replaced by types 272, 281, 282 and 285. In a long refit from October 1943 to July 1944, C turret was replaced by a quadruple 2-pounder pom-pom and two twin 20 mm were fitted. Radar 271 and 272 were removed and types 279b, 277 and 293 fitted.

Hermione was also completed as a five-turret ship. She had the .5-inch MGs removed in October–November 1941 and received five 20 mm.

Sirius was completed with five turrets and five 20 mm. She had received two more 20 mm by mid-1943. One of these was landed at Massawa at the end of 1943 and two 40 mm Bofors Mk III were fitted. (Note: in Italian East Africa captured during the East African campaign) She is listed as having only seven 20 mm as light AA in April 1944. By April 1945 she had two Mk III 40 mm fitted and had landed two 20 mm.

Cleopatra was completed with two 2-pounder pom-poms in 1942 in lieu of the .5-inch machine guns but these were removed in the middle of the year and replaced by five 20 mm. A sixth 20 mm was added in mid-1943. During repairs between November 1943 and November 1944, Q turret was removed, as were two quadruple 2-pounder pom-poms and five 20 mm. Three quadruple 40 mm Bofors and six twin 20 mm were fitted and there were four single 20 mm. In 1951 the American quadruple Bofors and Oerlikons were replaced by three twin MK 5 Bofors and eight single Mk 7.

Argonaut was completed with four 20 mm in lieu of the .5-inch machine guns. She had Q turret removed during repairs in 1943/44, and lost the four 20 mm. She received a quadruple 2-pounder pom-pom in lieu of the 5.25-inch and had five twin 20 mm fitted. By April 1944 her light AA comprised three quadruple 2-pounder pom-poms, six twin power-operated 20 mm and five singles. By the end of the war with Japan she had received five 40 mm Bofors and three 40 mm Bofors Mk III.

Scylla was completed with four twin 4.5-inch Mk III in UD MK III mountings because of a shortage of 5.25-inch mountings. The forward superstructure was considerably modified to accommodate these and also to increase crew spaces. Her light AA on completion was eight single 20 mm. Six twin power-operated 20 mm were added at the end of 1943.

Charybdis was also completed with four twin 4.5-inch and had a 4-inch Mk V forward of X mounting. Her light AA at completion was four 20 mm and two single 2-pounder pom-poms. The 4-inch star shell gun and two of the single 2-pounder pom-poms were removed and replaced by two twin and two single 20 mm, probably in 1943.

=== Bellonas ===
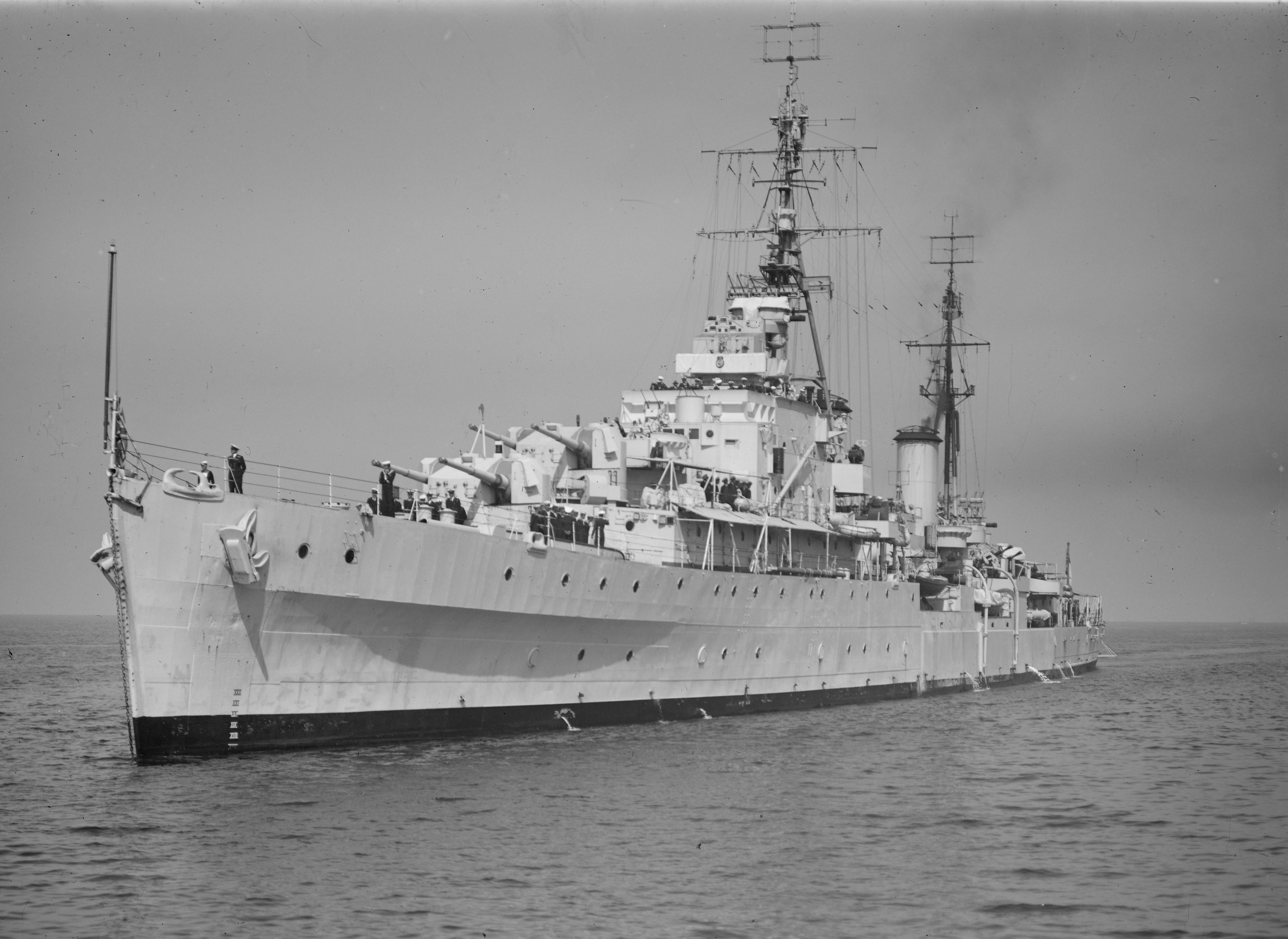
Bellona of the Bellona subclass

Spartan received no alterations as far as is known. Royalist was converted to an escort carrier squadron flagship immediately on completion, when an extra two twin 20 mm were fitted as well as four single 20 mm. She was the only ship to receive an extensive post-war modernisation ordered for service in the RN but was later loaned to New Zealand. Plans were drawn up to fully modernise the four improved Didos with either four twin 3-inch L70 guns or 4.5-inch Mark 6 gun turrets. However that would have required building new broad-beamed Didos because the magazines of the Royalist type could hold only enough 3 -inch ammunition for 3 minutes 20 seconds of continuous firing. The refit of Royalist was shortened and Diadem's was abandoned because the new steam turbines needed were unaffordable. Royalist′s reconstruction, like that of Newfoundland, incorporated much of the RN's late 1940s and early 1950s view of a desirable cruiser. Royalist′s 5.25-inch armament was given some of the improvements of the final 5.25 inch mounts built for the battleship Vanguard but not the extra space or power ramming. Also added was a secondary armament of three STAAG automatic twin 40mm guns, new Type 293 and 960M radar and Type 275 (two sets) DP fire control for the 5.25 guns, and a lattice mast. (Note: Royalist was loaned to the RNZN in 1956, in exchange for Bellona)

Bellona had four single 20 mm added by April 1944 and received an extra eight single 20 mm by April 1945. When she was loaned to the RNZN after the war, the twin Oerlikons were replaced by six single 40mm in the RNZN's own electric powered mount. Bellona was never fitted with six standard tachymetric directors which were requested by the RNZN for controlling the Bofors. The quadruple pom pom mounts were mothballed by RNZN for manning reasons but the single Oerlikons were maintained on Bellona.

Black Prince and Diadem also received eight single 20 mm, and had a further two twin 20 mm by early 1945.

== Post-war development ==
Post war in the expanded 1951 programme of the Korean War Emergency a broad beam Bellona class armed with four twin 4.5-inch guns was considered as a cruiser option along with the 1951 Minotaur class

Black Prince was loaned to the RNZN after the war and was operational briefly in 1947 before part of her crew mutinied and were discharged. After refit in 1952, with eight single electric powered 40mm Bofors and six single 20 mm Oerlikon, it was operated till 1955, during which it visited the 1953 Fleet Review at Spithead. Diadem (renamed after Babur, the founder of the Mughal dynasty) was sold to Pakistan in 1956 after a modest refit with Type 293 and Type 281 radar and standardised twin 40mm twin and single light AA guns. Babur became a cadet training ship in 1962 but was brought into use and her 5.25-inch guns were fired in the limited naval activities during the Indo-Pakistani War of 1965.

== Ships in class ==
Construction data, Dido group
Name	Pennant	Builder	Laid down	Launched	Commissioned	Fate
Dido	37	Cammell Laird, Birkenhead	26 October 1937	18 July 1939	30 September 1940	Broken up at Barrow-in-Furness, 1957
Argonaut	61	Cammell Laird, Birkenhead	21 November 1939	6 September 1941	8 August 1942	Broken up at Newport, 1955
Charybdis	88	Cammell Laird, Birkenhead	9 November 1939	17 September 1940	3 December 1941	Sunk at Battle of Sept-Îles, 23 October 1943
Phoebe	43	Fairfield Shipbuilding and Engineering Company, Govan	2 September 1937	25 March 1939	27 September 1940	Broken up at Blyth, 1956
Hermione	74	Alexander Stephen and Sons, Glasgow	6 October 1937	18 May 1939	25 March 1941	Torpedoed by the German submarine U-205, 16 June 1942
Bonaventure	31	Scotts Shipbuilding and Engineering Company, Greenock	30 August 1937	19 April 1939	24 May 1940	Torpedoed by the Italian submarine Ambra, 31 March 1941
Scylla	98	Scotts Shipbuilding and Engineering Company, Greenock	19 April 1939	24 July 1940	12 June 1942	Broken up at Barrow-in-Furness, 1950
Naiad	93	R. W. Hawthorn, Leslie and Company, Hebburn	26 August 1937	3 February 1939	24 July 1940	Torpedoed by the German submarine U-565, 11 March 1942
Cleopatra	33	R. W. Hawthorn, Leslie and Company, Hebburn	5 January 1939	27 March 1940	5 December 1941	Broken up at Newport, 1958
Sirius	82	Portsmouth Dockyard, Portsmouth	6 April 1938	18 September 1940	6 May 1942	Broken up at Blyth, 1956
Euryalus	42	Chatham Dockyard	21 October 1937	6 June 1939	30 June 1941	Broken up at Blyth, 1959

Construction data, Bellona group
Name	Pennant	Builder	Laid down	Launched	Commissioned	Fate
Bellona	63	Fairfield Shipbuilding and Engineering Company, Govan	30 November 1939	29 September 1942	29 October 1943	Broken up at Barrow-in-Furness, 1959
Royalist	89	Scotts Shipbuilding and Engineering Company, Greenock	21 March 1940	30 May 1942	10 September 1943	Broken up at Osaka, 1968
Diadem	84	R. W. Hawthorn, Leslie and Company, Hebburn	15 December 1939	26 August 1942	6 January 1944	Transferred to Pakistan, 1956. Renamed Babur. Scrap in 1985.
Black Prince	81	Harland and Wolff, Belfast	2 November 1939	27 August 1942	20 November 1943	Broken up at Osaka, 1962
Spartan	95	Vickers-Armstrongs, Barrow-in-Furness	21 December 1939	27 August 1942	10 August 1943	Sunk by aircraft, 29 January 1944

== See also ==
- Atlanta-class cruiser: contemporary American cruiser of similar size, role and configuration
