= HMS Dido (37) =

Dido class light cruiser

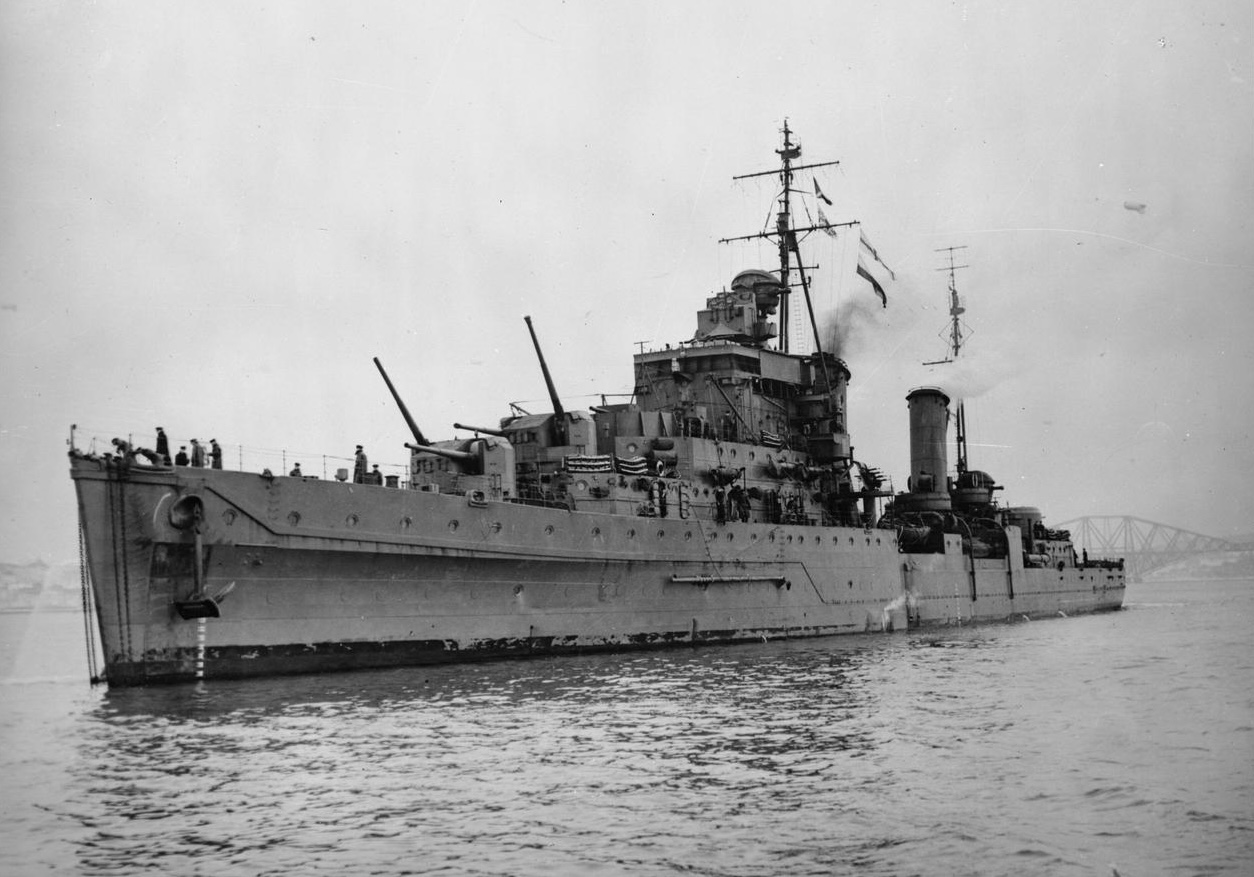
- Dido at anchor

History

United Kingdom
- Name: Dido
- Namesake: Dido
- Builder: Cammell Laird Shipyard (Birkenhead, UK)
- Laid down: 26 October 1937
- Launched: 18 July 1939
- Commissioned: 30 September 1940
- Out of service: October 1947
- Reclassified: In reserve at Gareloch (between 1947 and 1951) and at Portsmouth between 1951 and 1958
- Identification: Pennant number 37
- Fate: Scrapped, 18 July 1957

General characteristics (as built)
- Class & type: Dido-class anti-aircraft cruiser
- Displacement: 5,600 long tons (5,700 t) (standard); 6,850 long tons (6,960 t) (full load)
- Length: 485 ft (148 m) p.p.; 512 ft (156 m) o/a
- Beam: 50 ft 6 in (15.39 m)
- Draught: 14 ft (4.3 m)
- Installed power: 62,000 shp (46,000 kW)
- Propulsion: 4 × geared steam turbines; 4 × Admiralty 3-drum boilers; 4 × shafts
- Speed: 32.25 knots (59.73 km/h; 37.11 mph)
- Range: 1,500 nmi (2,800 km; 1,700 mi) at 30 knots (56 km/h; 35 mph); 4,240 nmi (7,850 km; 4,880 mi) at 16 knots (30 km/h; 18 mph)
- Complement: 480
- Sensors & processing systems: Type 281 RADAR from September 1940
- Armament: 10 × 5.25 in (133 mm) dual purpose guns (5 × 2); 1 × 4 in (100 mm) anti-aircraft gun; 12 × 2-pounder pom-pom guns (3 × 4); 8 × .50 cal machine guns (2 × 4); 6 × 21 inch (533 mm) torpedo tubes (2 × 3)
- Armour: Belt: 3 in (7.6 cm); Deck: 1 in (2.5 cm); Magazines: 2 in (5.1 cm); Bulkheads: 1 in (2.5 cm)

HMS Dido was the name ship of her class of light cruisers for the Royal Navy. Constructed by Cammell Laird Shipyard of Birkenhead, United Kingdom, she entered service in 1940 during World War II. The cruiser took part in several battles in the Mediterranean and Arctic theatres of war. Following the war, the ship performed ceremonial functions before being sold for scrapping in 1957.

== Construction and career ==
Dido's keel was laid down on 26 October 1937 by Cammell Laird Shipyard of Birkenhead. She was launched on 18 July 1939 and commissioned on 30 September 1940 at Birkenhead. Following her commissioning, Dido was sent to Scapa Flow for working up in September 1940. Part of this included high-speed sweeps off Fair Isle and Greenland. Immediately after this, Dido's first mission, in November 1940, was to escort the aircraft carrier Furious to West Africa, ferrying aircraft.

=== Mediterranean ===
Dido then spent four months on convoy duty in the Atlantic before running supplies to Malta where she joined the Eastern Mediterranean Fleet in April 1941. In May of that year Dido was sent to Crete and assisted in the evacuation of the British forces. As part of a convoy from Souda Bay to Egypt on 14 May, she carried bullion from Greece worth $7,000,000. On 29 May 1941 Dido was badly damaged by bombs whilst taking troops from Crete to Alexandria. Oberleutnant Wolf-Dietrich Huy from Jagdgeschwader 77 scored one of the hits. On 8 June 1941, Marines from Dido accepted the surrender of Assab in Eritrea. From July to November 1941, Dido was sent to the Brooklyn Navy Yard in New York City for a refit, before proceeding to the Royal Naval Dockyard in the Imperial fortress colony of Bermuda, then rejoining the Eastern Mediterranean Fleet in December 1941. The first three months of 1942 were spent on convoy escort duty between Alexandria and Malta but in March that year, Dido took part in a bombardment of Rhodes. A week later Dido joined the cruisers Cleopatra, Penelope, Carlisle, and Euryalus under the command of Rear Admiral Philip Vian at the Second Battle of Sirte.

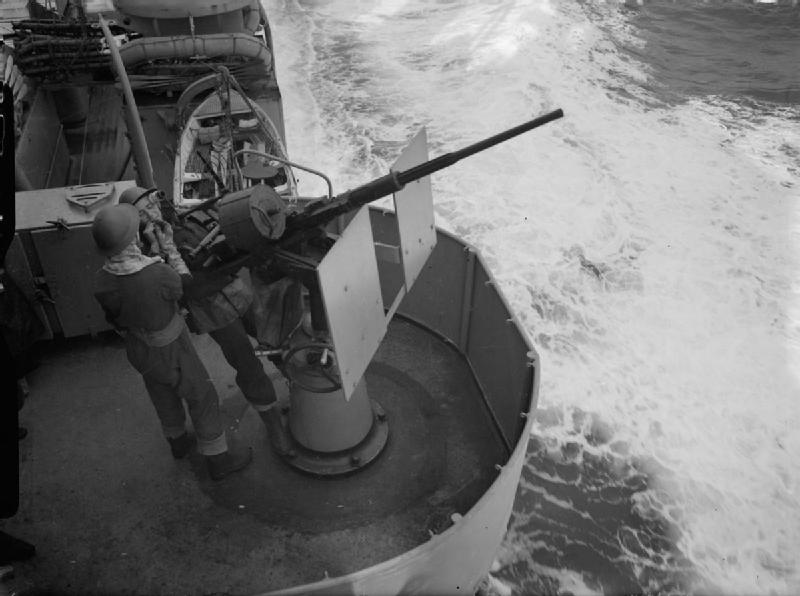
A 20 mm Oerlikon gunner on board Dido having a cigarette lit by his friend between bombing attacks in the eastern Mediterranean, January 1942.

On 18 August 1942 Captain H. W. U. McCall brought Dido to Massawa for major repairs to its bomb-damaged stern. As Dido was at that time one-quarter of British surface power in the Eastern Mediterranean it was critical that she be repaired as quickly as possible. The only working dry dock in Massawa was not large enough to lift Dido entirely so she was partially floated up to clear the stern, leaving the bow low in the water. Six days later Dido was undocked to return to battle with its sister ships, Euryalus, Cleopatra and Sirius. Dido then spent the rest of the year supporting the British campaign in North Africa before being transferred to the Western Mediterranean Fleet in December 1942. Dido then performed the duty of anti-aircraft guard at Bone and Algiers until March 1943.

In April 1943, Dido returned to Liverpool for a three-month refit before rejoining the Western Mediterranean squadron. The next month was spent taking part in diversionary bombardments against North Sicily during the Operation Husky landings. Dido was then used as an anti-aircraft guard for invasion bases at Palermo and Bizerte. On 12 September 1943, Dido escorted 600 troops to Taranto where the Italian Fleet surrendered. From Taranto, Dido went to Sorrento where she took part in the shelling to support troops. October and November 1943 saw Dido back in Alexandria for another refit. On return to service, Dido spent time in Malta and Taranto before taking part in a diversionary action off Civitavecchia in support of the Anzio landings. August 1944 saw Dido supporting the Allied Operation Dragoon the landing in southern France. In September 1944, Dido returned to the UK.

=== Arctic ===
In October 1944, Dido escorted a convoy to Russia before supporting carrier strikes off Norway. In April 1945, Dido escorted Apollo, Orwell and Obedient to the North Kola Inlet to lay mines. Dido's last mission in the war was to go to Copenhagen, firing the last naval shot in the war in Europe on the way for the surrender of the German Kriegsmarine which was signed aboard Dido. Dido escorted the German cruisers Prinz Eugen and Nürnberg to Wilhelmshaven.

=== Postwar ===
In July 1945, Dido took King George VI and Queen Elizabeth to the Isle of Man. Between 1946 and 1948 she was commanded by P Reid. In 1953 she took part in the Fleet Review to celebrate the Coronation of Queen Elizabeth II, where she was flagship of the Reserve Fleet. She was subsequently decommissioned and sold for scrap to Thos. W. Ward and scrapped at Barrow-in-Furness in 1957.

== Sources ==
- Ellsberg, Edward (1946). Under the Red Sea Sun. New York: Dodd, Mead and Co. OCLC 1311913.
- Jeffs, Eric (2005). HMS Dido: A Tiffy's Tale. Ilfracombe: Arthur H. Stockwell. ISBN 0-7223-3706-X.
- Macintyre, Donald (1967). "Shipborne Radar". Proceedings. Annapolis, MD: United States Naval Institute. ISSN 0041-798X.
- Prien, Jochen (1992). Geschichte des Jagdgeschwaders 77—Teil 1—1934–1941 [History of Jagdgeschwader 77—Volume 1—1934–1941] (in German). Eutin, Germany: Struve-Druck. ISBN 978-3-923457-19-9.
- Thomas, David Arthur (1980) [1972]. Crete 1941: The Battle at Sea. Athens: Efstathiadis Group. ISBN 978-0-23-396272-6.
