= HMS Spartan (95) =

Cruiser of the Royal Navy

Coordinates: 41°26′2″N 12°41′2″E

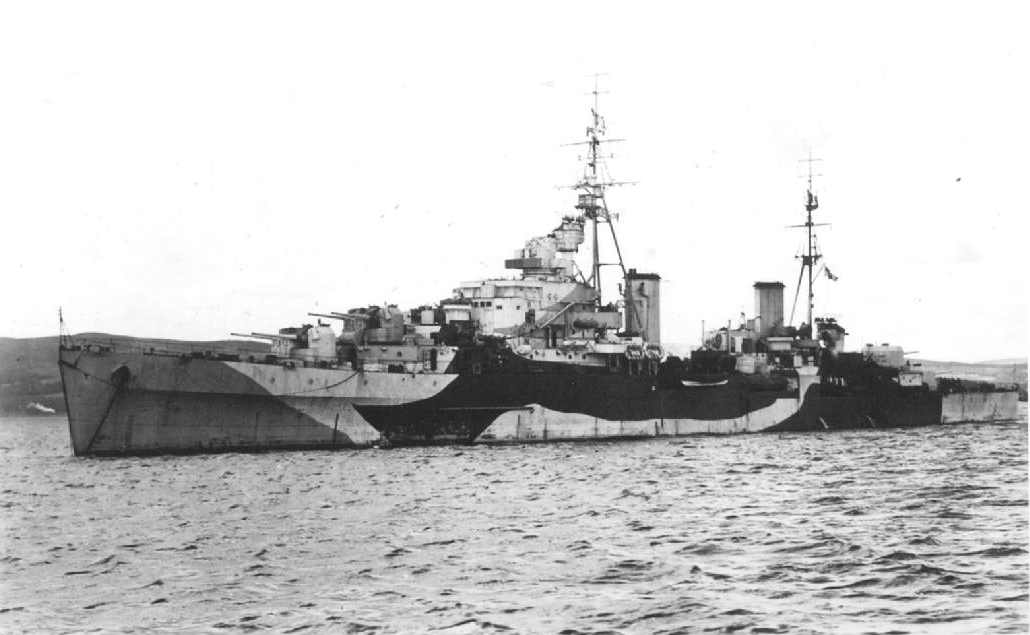
- Spartan newly completed off Barrow-in-Furness, August 1943

History

United Kingdom
- Name: Spartan
- Builder: Vickers-Armstrongs, Barrow-in-Furness
- Laid down: 21 December 1939
- Launched: 27 August 1942
- Completed: 10 August 1943
- Commissioned: 12 July 1943 (Note: From ship's official log at the National Archives)
- Fate: Sunk 29 January 1944

General characteristics (as built)
- Class & type: Dido-class light cruiser
- Displacement: 5,950 long tons (6,050 t) (standard); 7,200 long tons (7,300 t) (full load)
- Length: 485 ft (148 m) p.p.; 512 ft (156 m) o/a
- Beam: 50 ft 6 in (15.39 m)
- Draught: 14 ft (4.3 m)
- Installed power: 62,000 shp (46,000 kW)
- Propulsion: 4 × Parsons geared turbines; 4 × Admiralty 3-drum boilers; 4 × shafts
- Speed: 32.25 knots (59.73 km/h; 37.11 mph)
- Range: 1,500 mi (2,400 km) at 30 knots (56 km/h; 35 mph); 4,240 mi (6,820 km) at 16 knots (30 km/h; 18 mph)
- Complement: 530
- Armament: 8 × QF 5.25-inch (133 mm) dual purpose guns (4x2); 12 × 2-pounder anti-aircraft guns (3x4); 12 × 20 mm anti-aircraft cannons (6x2); 6 × 21 inch (533 mm) torpedo tubes (2x3)
- Armour: Belt: 3 in (7.6 cm); Deck: 1 in (2.5 cm); Magazines: 2 in (5.1 cm); Bulkheads: 1 in (2.5 cm)

HMS Spartan was a Dido-class light cruiser of the Bellona subgroup of the Royal Navy. She was a modified Dido design with only four turrets but improved anti-aircraft armament - also known as Dido Group 2.

== Construction and commissioning ==
Spartan was built by Vickers-Armstrongs at Barrow-in-Furness, United Kingdom, with her keel being laid down on 21 December 1939. She was launched on 27 August 1942, commissioned on 12 July 1943 and completed on 10 August 1943.

== History ==
Commissioned with a Devonport crew under the command of Captain P.V. McLaughlin, Royal Navy, Spartan was originally intended for service with the Eastern Fleet, but after a couple of months with the Home Fleet, spent mainly working-up at Scapa Flow, on 17 October 1943 she left Plymouth Sound for the Mediterranean, sailing by way of Gibraltar and Algiers, she arrived at Malta on 28 October 1943 to be temporarily attached to the Mediterranean Fleet. She went on to Taranto to join the 15th Cruiser Squadron on 8 November.

On the night of 18–19 January 1944 Spartan carried out a diversionary bombardment in the Terracina area, and—with the cruiser Orion and four destroyers—provided useful supporting fire during the Garigliano River Operations. There was only minor opposition from shore batteries, and during the bombardment Spartan alone fired 900 rounds.

Operation Shingle—the landing of troops at Anzio—began on 22 January 1944, and Orion and Spartan were detailed to provide gun support. There was little opposition, and Spartan returned to Naples to remain available at short notice.

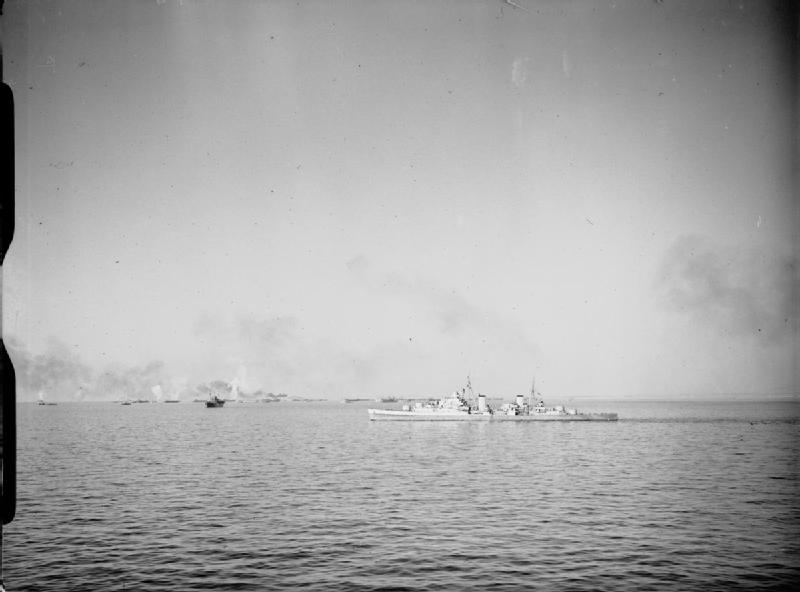
Spartan bombarding enemy shore positions as the landing craft of the U.S. 5th Army close in on the beaches in the opening stages in the battle for Rome. Smoke can be seen rising from the beachhead.

On 27 January she was ordered to report to CTF 81 for anti-aircraft protection duties off Anzio. At sunset on 29 January the Luftwaffe began a glide bomb attack on the ships in Anzio Bay. At the time of the attack Spartan was anchored. Smoke had been ordered in the anchorage but was not fully effective owing to the short time it was in operation and the strong breeze. Spartan was making smoke from stem to stern but was not herself covered.

About 18 aircraft approached from the north and circling over land, delivered a beam attack against the ships that were silhouetted against the afterglow. Due to the timing of the attack the aircraft were seen only by very few, and radar was ineffective owing to land echoes.

By the time the warning had been received and the ships had opened fire in the general direction of the attack, six bombs were already approaching the anchorage, most of them falling into the water. But at about 18:00 a radio-controlled Henschel Hs 293 glide bomb hit Spartan just aft of the after funnel and detonated high up in the compartments abreast the port side of the after boiler room, blowing a large hole in the upper deck.

The main mast collapsed and boiler rooms were flooded. Steam and electrical power failed, a serious fire developed and the ship heeled over to port. About an hour after being hit, Spartan had to be abandoned, and 10 minutes later she settled on her beam ends in about 25–30 ft (7.6–9.1 m) of water.

Five officers and 41 ratings were posted killed or missing presumed killed, and 42 ratings were wounded.

== Bibliography ==
- Campbell, N.J.M. (1980). "Great Britain". In Chesneau, Roger (ed.). Conway's All the World's Fighting Ships 1922–1946. New York: Mayflower Books. pp. 2–85. ISBN 0-8317-0303-2.
- Colledge, J. J.; Warlow, Ben & Bush, Steve (2020). Ships of the Royal Navy: The Complete Record of all Fighting Ships of the Royal Navy from the 15th Century to the Present (5th revised and updated ed.). Barnsley, UK: Seaforth Publishing. ISBN 978-1-5267-9327-0.
- Friedman, Norman (2010). British Cruisers: Two World Wars and After. Barnsley, UK: Seaforth Publishing. ISBN 978-1-59114-078-8.
- Lenton, H. T. (1998). British & Empire Warships of the Second World War. Annapolis, Maryland: Naval Institute Press. ISBN 1-55750-048-7.
- Raven, Alan & Roberts, John (1980). British Cruisers of World War Two. Annapolis, Maryland: Naval Institute Press. ISBN 0-87021-922-7.
- Rohwer, Jürgen (2005). Chronology of the War at Sea 1939–1945: The Naval History of World War Two (Third Revised ed.). Annapolis, Maryland: Naval Institute Press. ISBN 1-59114-119-2.
- Whitley, M. J. (1995). Cruisers of World War Two: An International Encyclopedia. London: Cassell. ISBN 1-86019-874-0.
