= HMS Charybdis (88) =

Cruiser of the Royal Navy

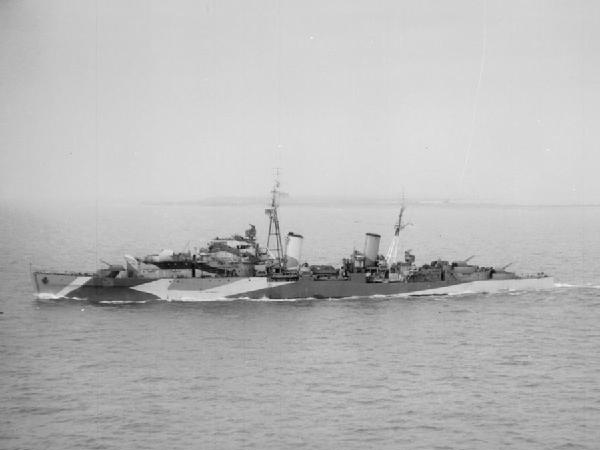
- Charybdis underway, February 1943

History

United Kingdom
- Name: Charybdis
- Builder: Cammell Laird, Birkenhead
- Laid down: 9 November 1939
- Launched: 17 September 1940
- Completed: 3 December 1941
- Identification: Pennant number: 88
- Fate: Sunk during the Battle of Sept-Îles, 23 October 1943
- Badge: On a Field White, issuant from a whirlpool in base a fig tree Proper, suspended from the branches a bat inverted Gold.

General characteristics (as built)
- Class & type: Dido-class light cruiser
- Displacement: 5,600 tons (standard); 6,975 tons (full load)
- Length: 485 ft (148 m) pp; 512 ft (156 m) (o/a)
- Beam: 50 ft 6 in (15.39 m)
- Draught: 14.3 ft (4.4 m)
- Installed power: 4 Admiralty 3-drum boilers; 62,000 shp (46 MW)
- Propulsion: 4 shafts; 4 geared steam turbines
- Speed: 32.25 knots (59.73 km/h; 37.11 mph)
- Range: 6,824 km (4,240 miles) at 16 knots
- Complement: 480
- Armament: 8 × 4.5 in DP dual guns, 1 × 4 in (102 mm) starshell gun, 8 × 20 mm (0.8 in) Oerlikon single guns, 2 × 2-pounder (40 mm) 'pom-poms' single guns, 2 × 21 inch (533 mm) triple torpedo tubes
- Armour: Belt: 3 in (76 mm), Deck: 1 in (25 mm), Magazines: 2 in (51 mm), Bulkheads: 1 in (25 mm); Turrets: ½ inch

HMS Charybdis was a Dido-class cruiser built for the Royal Navy and was sunk with severe loss of life by German torpedo boats in an action in the English Channel in October 1943.

== Design and construction ==
Charybdis was intended to fulfill a primarily anti-aircraft role and was designed with a primary armament of ten QF 5.25 inch guns. This gun had also been selected as the secondary armament for the King George V-class battleships also under construction at this time. Delays in the delivery of the turrets, prioritised for the battleships after the outbreak of the Second World War, resulted in several of the Dido class being fitted with different primary armament. Charybdis and another Dido-class cruiser, HMS Scylla, were armed with four twin QF 4.5 in Mk.III guns instead of the 5.25 inch guns. These 4.5 inch guns had originally been intended for the Danae-class cruisers as part of an upgrade programme. Scylla and Charybdis's armament put them on a par with the Tribal-class destroyers for surface action, but with much superior high angle capability. Charybdis differed from Scylla in having a single QF 4 inch Mk V gun mounted. Her armament changed during her time in service, with the 4 inch Mk V gun removed in an early 1943 refit and ten 20 mm guns added. As originally fitted, Charybdis also had eight QF 2 pounder guns arranged in two quadruple mountings, and six 21 inch torpedo tubes arranged above water in two triple banks.

Like the other ships of the class, Charybdis was named after a character in Greek mythology. Charybdis is the name of a sea monster, usually mentioned alongside Scylla, the name given to another Dido-class ship, in the idiom "between Scylla and Charybdis". She was laid down at the yards of Cammell Laird at Birkenhead on 9 November 1939, and launched on 17 September 1940. After fitting out and undergoing trials, she was completed for service on 3 December 1941. (Note: Some sources use this date for the commissioning as well, though naval-history.net instead records she was commissioned on 15 November 1941, following a publication by the Charybdis/Limbourne Association.)

== Service ==
=== Home waters and Mediterranean ===
After trials Charybdis joined the Home Fleet and in December 1941 escorted the 1st Minelaying Squadron during Operation SN81, the laying of mines in the Northern Barrage. She remained with the Home Fleet into 1942, and in March was adopted by the civil community of Birkenhead, Cheshire, where she had been built, after a Warship Week savings campaign. On 30 March Charybdis sailed as an escort for another minelaying operation, SN87. In April 1942 she was assigned to join Force H at Gibraltar, and sailed for there as an escort for the aircraft carrier USS Wasp and battlecruiser HMS Renown. Charybdis joined Force W at Gibraltar and escorted Wasp into the Mediterranean to deliver aircraft to Malta as part of Operation Calendar. After the aircraft had been successfully flown off, Charybdis returned to Gibraltar with Wasp, and escorted her part of the way into the Atlantic. Deployed for the next few months with Force W, Charybdis escorted a number of aircraft carriers on journeys into the Mediterranean to a point where their aircraft could be flown off to reinforce Malta. As one of the escorting ships, Charybdis screened Wasp and the British carrier HMS Eagle for Operation Bowery in early May, and Eagle and HMS Argus at the end of the month in Operation LB. Aircraft carrier operations continued into June 1942, with Charybdis supporting Operation Style and then Operation Salient.

On 11 June Force W, including Charybdis, joined the carriers Eagle and Argus, with further escort provided by the battleship HMS Malaya, the cruisers HMS Kenya and HMS Liverpool and a number of destroyers to screen Operation Harpoon. The convoy in Operation Harpoon was run in conjunction with a convoy from Egypt, Operation Vigorous, both of which tried to supply food and matériel by splitting enemy forces. In July 1942 Charybdis covered Operations Pinpoint and Insect, two more carrier deliveries of aircraft to Malta. By August 1942 Charybdis joined Force Z to provide an escort for HMS Eagle in the Malta convoy Operation Pedestal.

=== Operation Pedestal ===
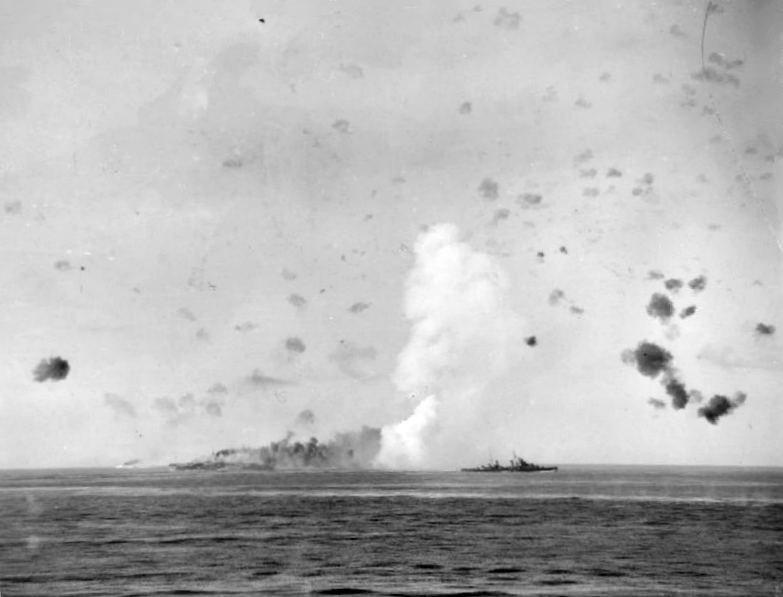
Operation Pedestal: 12 August 1942: HMS Indomitable on fire after being bombed. HMS Charybdis is screening the carrier.

Operation Pedestal was built around a 15-ship convoy of merchantmen, escorted by a powerful force consisting of two battleships, four aircraft carriers, seven cruisers and twenty six destroyers. The convoy came under heavy air and U-boat attack, sustaining high losses. HMS Eagle was sunk by torpedoes from German submarine U-73, and only five merchant ships, including the damaged tanker SS Ohio, survived to reach Malta. After Eagle's sinking, Charybdis launched a series of depth charge attacks in an unsuccessful hunt for U-73. She then stood by the damaged carrier HMS Indomitable and provided anti-air defence while salvage operations were carried out. On 13 July the taskforce's commander, Admiral Edward Neville Syfret, sent her to join Force X, in company with HMS Eskimo and HMS Somali, as the merchants came under heavy air attack while passing through the Strait of Sicily. Charybdis took the place of the crippled HMS Manchester for this, before returning to Force Z on 14 July and continuing to engage enemy aircraft.

=== Atlantic and return to the Mediterranean ===
The focus of Charybdis's operations changed in September 1942, and she was assigned to patrol in the Atlantic, searching for German blockade runners attempting to reach Atlantic ports from the Far East. At the end of October she took part in Operation Train, escorting the carrier HMS Furious with further aircraft reinforcements for Malta. On 25 November 1942 she was allocated to the 12th Cruiser Squadron in Force H and sailed from Gibraltar for Algiers to take part in Operation Torch - the landings in Morocco and Algeria. She escorted the invasion convoys and provided bombardment support for the land forces, as well as anti-air defence. On 12 December 1942 Charybdis sailed for the United Kingdom to undergo a refit.

Charybdis joined the Home Fleet after the completion of the work and trials in March 1943. Initially based at Scapa Flow, she covered minelaying operations and patrolled the North Sea until April 1943, when she was transferred temporarily to the Plymouth Command. There she was assigned to escort allied convoys and patrol in the Bay of Biscay. Charybdis was again back in Gibraltar in August 1943 and from there escorted Mediterranean convoys.

In September Charybdis was part of Force V covering Operation Avalanche, the landings at Salerno. During her time off the Italian coast she carried US General Dwight D. Eisenhower to Salerno. She returned to Plymouth the following month, supposedly for a short period of leave. However, operational requirements directed that, almost immediately, the leave was cut short, and she resumed work in the Bay of Biscay.

== Operation Tunnel and sinking ==
In late 1943, the British authorities were aware of the approach of the German blockade runner Münsterland, which was carrying an important cargo of latex and strategic metals. The Germans had a well-rehearsed procedure for escorting such vessels. The British reacted by executing "Operation Tunnel", a standard operation whereby available ships would attempt to intercept. Of the planning of this operation Lieutenant-Commander Roger Hill voiced his reservations to senior staff, but his advice was not heeded.^{[15]} Charybdis was assigned to the operation on 20 October, and on 22 October the British force put to sea. With Charybdis were the fleet destroyers HMS Grenville and Rocket, and four Hunt-class destroyers: Limbourne, Wensleydale, Talybont and Stevenstone. Münsterland's escorts consisted of five Type 39 torpedo boats of the 4th Torpedo Boat Flotilla, commanded by Franz Kohlauf.

Charybdis picked up the convoy on her radar at a range of 7 nautical miles (13 km; 8.1 mi), but did not intercept radio transmissions. Limbourne heard radio transmissions but could not pick up the ships on radar as Charybdis was blocking her view. At 1:38am the German torpedo boat T23, under the command of Friedrich-Karl Paul, spotted Charybdis, which was hit on the port side by two torpedoes out of a salvo of six fired by T23 and T27. Limbourne was also hit during this action and was later scuttled by HMS Rocket. The German force escaped unharmed. Charybdis sank within half an hour, in position 48°59′N 3°39′W, with the loss of 462 men including her captain George Voelcker. (Note: The number of casualties is difficult to determine, several figures appearing in sources. Uboat.net states 464 men were lost. Naval-history.net in one place has 426 men, while the Charybdis/Limbourne Association concludes the "over 500 Men of Charybdis perished on that night". Wartime casualty lists day by day on naval-history.net records the names of 462 men from Charybdis either "killed" or "missing presumed killed", the site also stating on another page that Charybdis sank with the "loss of 30 officers 432 ratings".) Four officers and 103 ratings survived. Münsterland was eventually forced ashore and destroyed west of Cap Blanc-Nez on 21 January 1944 by fire from British coastal artillery after she ran aground.

== Legacy and commemoration ==
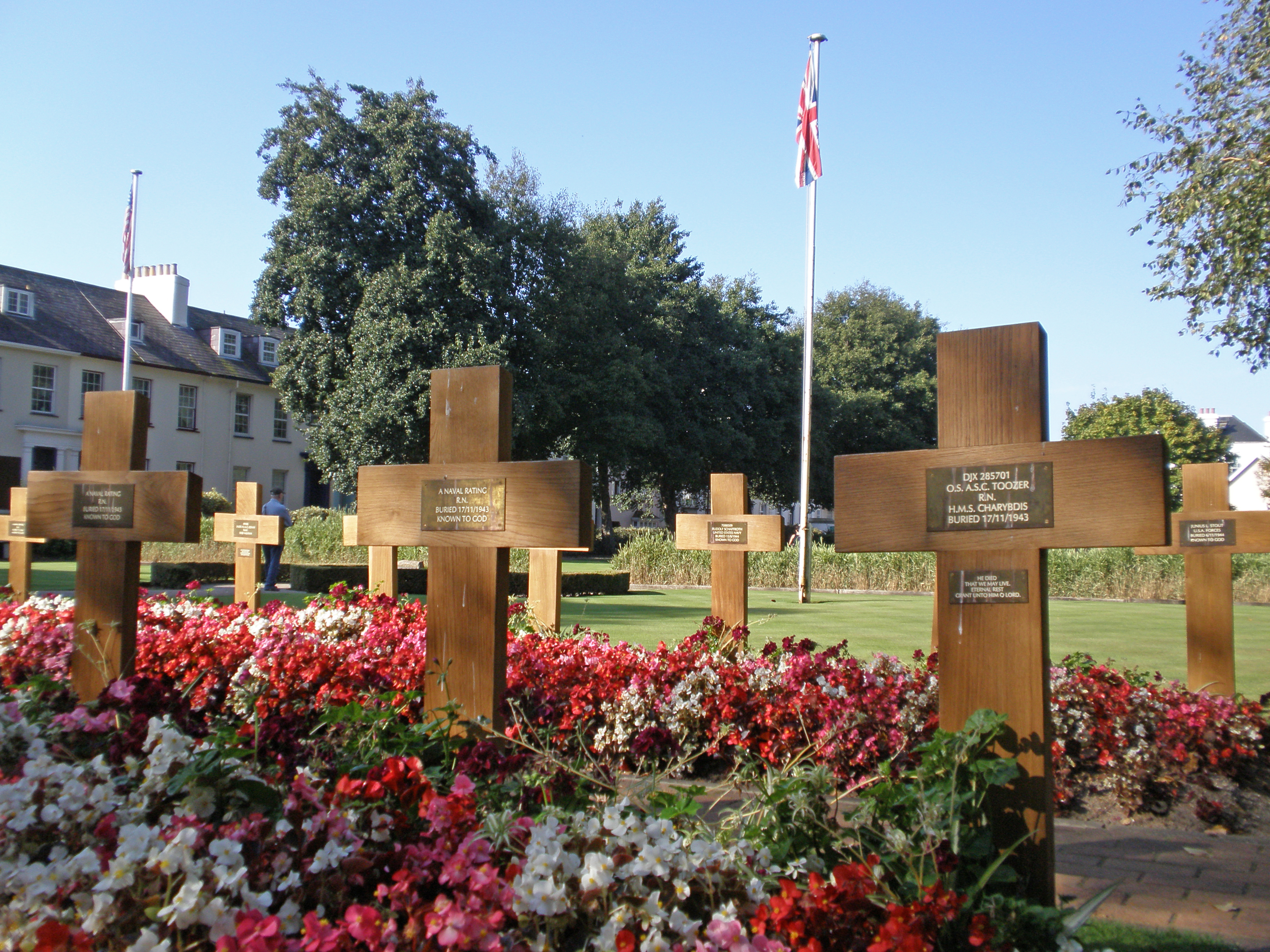
A number of bodies washed ashore from the sunken Charybdis were buried in the war cemetery in Saint Saviour, Jersey

Charybdis gained six battle honours during her service: Malta Convoys 1942, North Africa 1942, Salerno 1943, Atlantic 1943, English Channel 1943 and Biscay 1943.

Soon after the sinking, the bodies of 21 Royal Navy and Royal Marine men were washed up in Guernsey. The German occupation authorities buried them with full military honours. The funerals became an opportunity for some of the islanders to demonstrate their loyalty to Britain and their opposition to the Nazi occupiers: around 5,000 islanders attended the funeral, laying some 900 wreaths – enough of a demonstration against the Nazi occupation for subsequent military funerals to be closed to civilians by the German occupiers. Every year a commemoration service is held, in October, which is attended by survivors of the action and their relatives, the Guernsey Association of Royal Navy and Royal Marines, Sea Cadets, St John's Ambulance Brigade, the Police, the Red Cross and representatives of the Royal Navy and the public.

Other members of the crew are buried in Jersey at St Helier (38), and in France at Dinard (96), Saint-Brieuc (47), Île-de-Bréhat (1), Saint-Germain-sur-Ay (1), Anneville-sur-Mer (1) and Saint-Charles-de-Percy (2). The wrecks of Charybdis and Limbourne have been located. Charybdis was found in 1993, lying in 83 m (272 ft) of water.

== Citations ==
- Hill, Roger. (1979). pp. 167–176.
