= Type 279 radar =

Type 279
- Country of origin: United Kingdom
- Introduced: 1940
- Type: Early-warning radar
- Frequency: 43 MHz
- PRF: 50 per second
- Pulsewidth: 7–30 μs
- Range: 50 nautical miles (93 km; 58 mi)
- Power: 70 kW

The Type 279 radar was a British naval early-warning radar developed during World War II from the Type 79 metric early-warning set. It initially had separate transmitting and receiving antennas that were later combined in the Type 279M to single-antenna operation. This set also had a secondary surface-search mode with surface and aerial gunnery capability and used a Precision Ranging Panel, which passed accurate radar ranges directly to the HACS table (analog computer).

== Specifications ==
Type	Aerial outfit	Peak power (kW)	Frequency (MHz)	Wavelength (mm)	In service
279		70	39.9	7,450	1940
279M		70	39.9	7,450	1941

== Bibliography ==
- Brown, Louis (1999). A Radar History of World War II: Technological and Military Imperatives. Bristol and Philadelphia: Institute of Physics Publishing. ISBN 0-7503-0659-9.
- Friedman, Norman (1981). Naval Radar. London: Conway Maritime Press. ISBN 0-85177-238-2.
- Swords, Sean S. (1986). Technical History of the Beginnings of Radar. London: IEE/Peter Peregrinus. ISBN 0-86341-043-X.
- Watson, Raymond C. Jr. (2009). Radar Origins Worldwide: History of Its Evolution in 13 Nations Through World War II. Trafford. ISBN 978-1-4269-2111-7.
