= QF 5.25-inch naval gun =

QF 5.25-inch Mark I
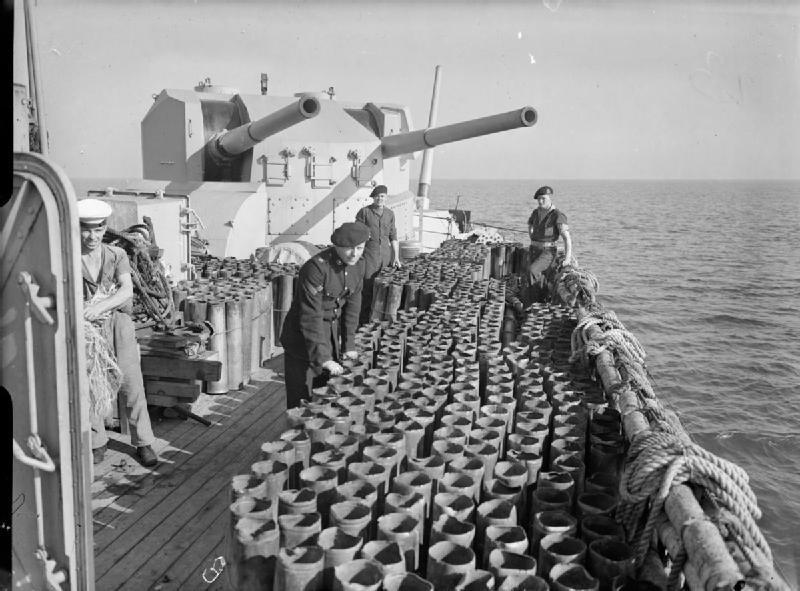
- 5.25-inch turret on HMS Sirius. The empty cartridge cases from firing in support of the Allied invasion of Normandy, June 1944
- Type: Dual-purpose gun
- Place of origin: United Kingdom

Service history
- In service: 1940-1985 (naval) (Note: HMNZS Royalist was not decommissioned until 1966, although she appears to have ended "active service" some years before. All other ships were decommissioned by 1962 except PNS Babur which served until 1985.); 1942-1960s (land)
- Used by: Royal Navy; Royal Artillery; Royal Australian Artillery
- Wars: World War II; Korean War

Production history
- Designed: 1935
- Variants: Mk I, Mk II (Note: Britain used Roman numerals to denote "Marks" (i.e. models) of ordnance until after World War II.)

Specifications
- Mass: Barrel & breech: 9,616 lb (4,362 kg)
- Length: Total: 22 ft 11.5 in (7 m)
- Barrel length: Bore: 21 ft 10.5 in (6.67 m) 50 calibres
- Shell: 133x782 mm R Separate QF, 80 pounds (36.29 kg)
- Calibre: 5.25-inch (133 mm)
- Elevation: -5 to +70 degrees
- Rate of fire: 7-8 rpm sustained fire
- Muzzle velocity: Naval: 2,672 ft/s (814 m/s); Army AA: 2,800 ft/s (850 m/s)
- Effective firing range: Naval: 23,400 yd (21,400 m) at 45 degrees with HE shell at 2,600 ft/s (790 m/s); AA: 36,000 ft (11,000 m)
- Maximum firing range: Naval: 24,070 yd (22,010 m) at 45 degrees with HE shell at 2,672 ft/s (814 m/s); AA: 46,500 ft (14,200 m)

The QF 5.25-inch Mark I gun was the heaviest dual-purpose gun used by the Royal Navy during the Second World War. Although considered less than completely successful, it saw extensive service. 267 guns were built.

== Design ==
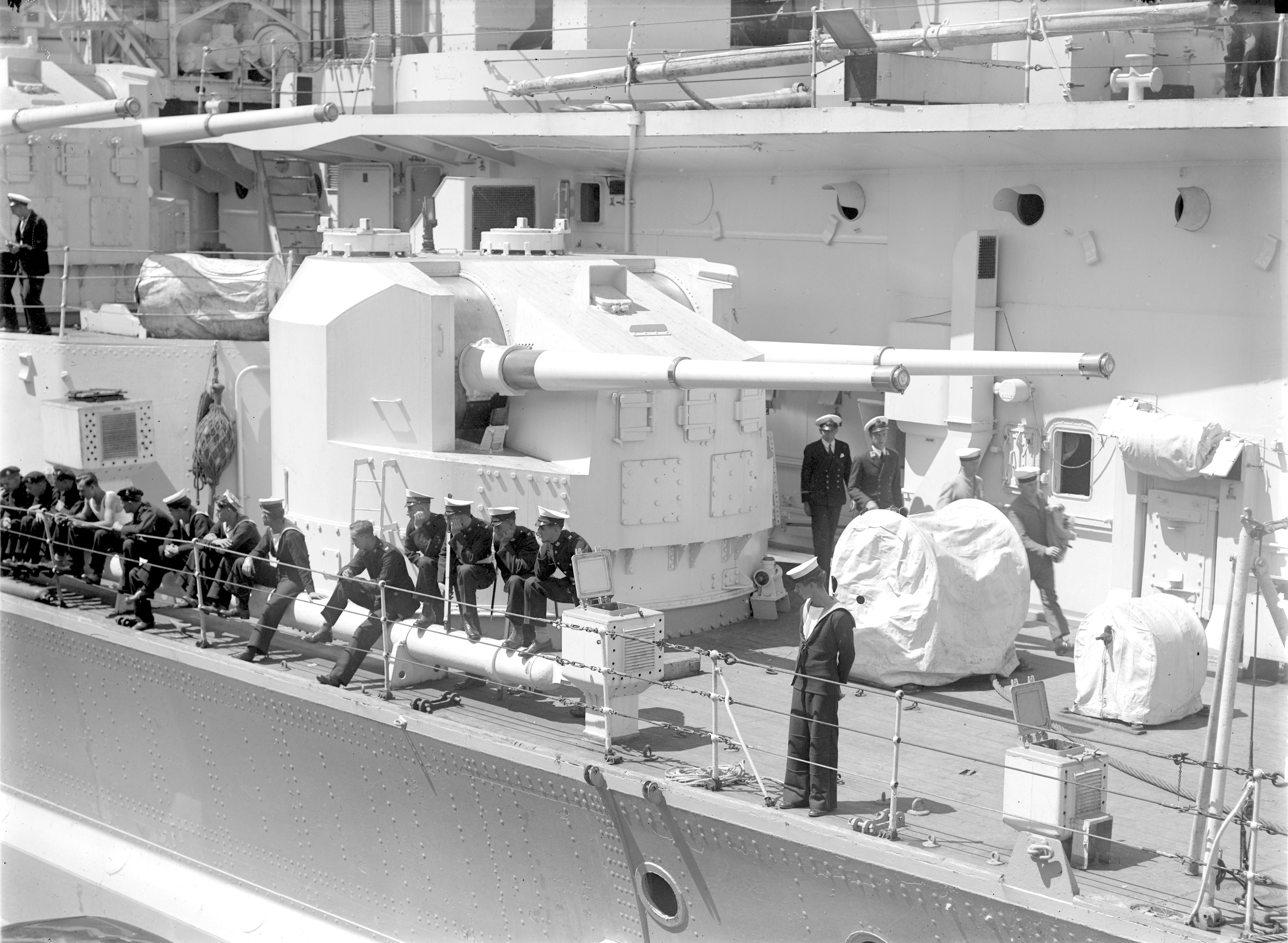
QF 5.25-inch Mark I turret on HMS King George V

Unlike its French and Italian contemporaries of similar size the QF 5.25-inch gun was designed as dual-purpose equipment capable of engaging both aircraft and surface targets. Combining the secondary and heavy anti-aircraft armament allowed a significant weight savings for the King George V-class battleships, which were designed to meet the Washington Naval Treaty limit of 35,000 tons. The gun fired an 80 lb (36 kg) shell, which was considered the largest that a gun crew could easily handle while still having the rate of fire needed for anti-aircraft use. In 1944, VT-fuzed shells became available, making the gun significantly more effective against aircraft.

The 5.25-inch gun was carried in Mk I twin mountings by the King George V class and in Mk II twin mountings on nine of the first eleven Dido-class anti-aircraft cruisers, the exceptions being HMS Scylla and HMS Charybdis, which mounted QF 4.5-inch Mk III guns due to shortages of the 5.25-inch gun. The last five of the Dido class also known as the Bellona-class anti-aircraft cruisers mounted the 5.25-inch gun in the Remote Power Control RP10 Mk II mountings, which offered much-improved training and elevating speeds. The number of turrets on the Bellona class were reduced from five to four and the number of light AA guns were increased. The RP10 Mk II mountings were also later used to replace the Mk I mountings on HMS Anson. The last of the Royal Navy's battleships which was commissioned after the war, HMS Vanguard, had MK I turrets with enlarged gun houses compared to those fitted to the King George V and Dido-class ships, although the width between the guns remained the same. A slightly more powerful Mk II variant was also deployed by the British Army as an anti-aircraft and coast-defence gun.

== Naval service ==
The RN Gunnery Pocket Book published in 1945 states:

they fulfil the combined functions of H.A. Long Range Armament and Secondary Armament against surface craft. The 5.25 in. calibre with separate ammunition is used for dual High Angle and Low Angle Armament, since it gives the reasonable maximum weight of shell which can be loaded by the average gun's crew for sustained periods at all angles of elevation. The maximum rate of fire should be 10-12 rounds per minute.

A wartime account describes HMS Euryalus demonstration firing her main armament:

...the ship's company closed to action-stations and gave a demonstration of the cruiser's firepower to the army officers... in the form of a low angle barrage. Set to burst at 2000 yds range, a terrific barrage was put up for two minutes and we fired some two hundred rounds of 5.25-inch HE...A wall of bursting shell was thrown up just above sea level and I could see that the army officers were impressed...

The ballistic performance of the QF 5.25 was very good, with a maximum range of 24,070 yd (22,010 m) at 45 degrees with an 80 lb (36 kg) HE shell. In comparison, the French 138 mm (5.4 in) Mle 1934 guns as used on the Mogador-class destroyers had a maximum range of 21,872 yd (20,000 m) at 30 degrees with an 88 lb (40 kg) SAP shell. The Italian 135/45 mm gun as used on the Capitani Romani-class cruisers had a maximum range of 21,435 yd (19,600 m) at 45 degrees with a 72.1 lb (32.7 kg) AP shell.

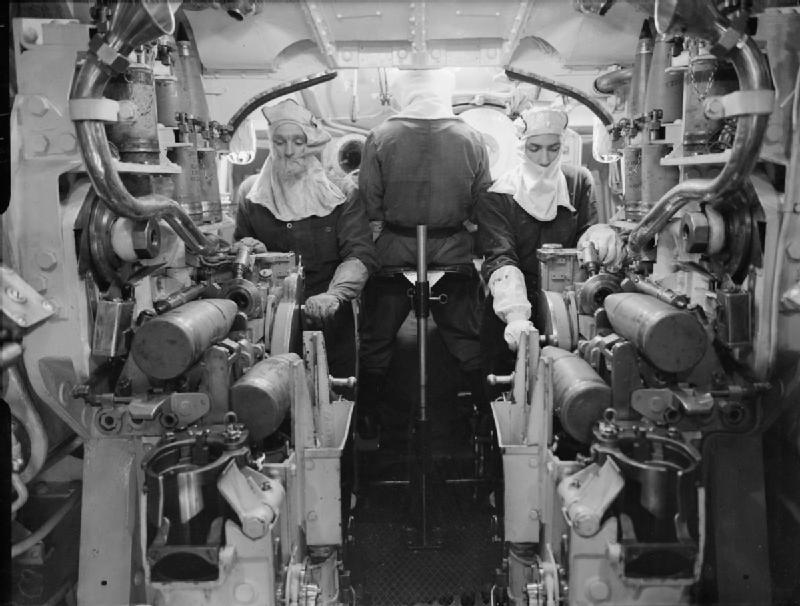
Inside a 5.25-inch gun turret on HMS King George V in 1943.

The QF 5.25 guns performed well on HMS Prince of Wales during Operation Halberd, escorting a convoy to Malta under, but later Prince of Wales was overwhelmed and sunk while operating along with Repulse when Force Z was attacked by Japanese aircraft, due to factors unrelated to the guns' performance. No Dido-class cruisers were lost to air attack, although four were sunk by submarine or surface-launched torpedoes. However HMS Spartan, a Bellona-class cruiser (Improved Dido), was sunk at anchor in 1944 by a Luftwaffe guided missile. According to postwar publications the gunhouses were cramped, and the heavy projectile and cartridge cases resulted in a reduced sustained rate of fire to seven or eight rounds per minute rather than the designed twelve rounds per minute. However, these factors do not appear to have reduced Euryalus's rate of fire, over a one-minute period, which was typical for a World War II AA engagement. The dual-mount turrets 10 deg/s traversal speed was considered too slow to engage higher-speed aircraft at close range. (Note: A 270-knot (500 km/h; 310 mph) target crossing the line of sight at right angles, at 2,000 yd (1,800 m) range, will move across the line of sight at 4.5 degrees per second. This simple fact of geometry appears to contradict the assertion that a 10-degree-per-second traverse rate was too slow to track a high-speed aircraft.) Nevertheless, these elevation and traverse rates were still higher than some contemporary weapons, such as the 10.5 cm SK C/33 twin mounts carried on the German battleships Bismarck and Tirpitz.

== Ship classes ==
Ships with QF 5.25 inch Mark I guns:

- King George V-class battleships
- Dido-class cruisers
- HMS Vanguard

== Land service ==
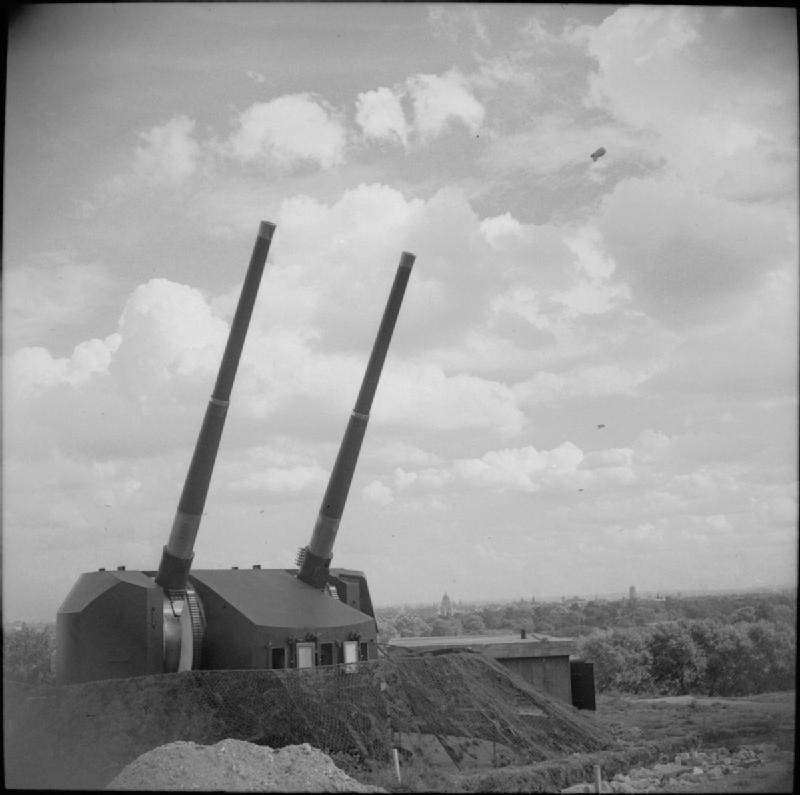
Twin naval anti-aircraft mounting at Primrose Hill, London, August 1943

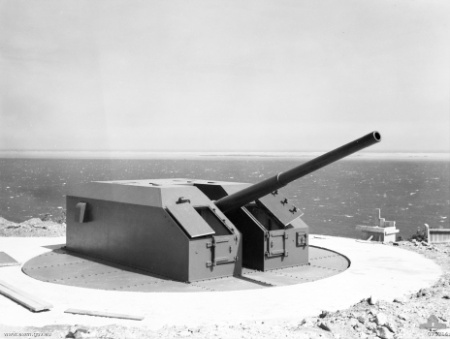
A single gun of the 801st AA & Coast Arty Battery in Port Moresby, Papua, August 1944

In early 1942 the Governor of Gibraltar sought 5.25-in guns for dual anti-aircraft/coast defence role. None was forthcoming. However, later that year Anti-Aircraft Command in UK acquired three twin-gun turrets from the Admiralty, which were installed around London in permanent positions. Trials and use led the army to design a single gun mounting in two marks, both with an underground engine room to provide electrical and hydraulic power for traverse, elevation, fuze setting, ramming and other tasks. Fitted with the standard army Machine Fuze Setter No 10, these guns had a rate of fire of 10 rds/min and a maximum height of 50,000 ft, with an effective height of 36,000 ft. Mark 1A was a mild steel turret for anti-aircraft use only, Mk 1B was an armoured turret for anti aircraft and coast defence use. The gun was designated Mk 2.

By the end of 1943 only 16 of the new guns had been installed, far below projections. By the end of the war 164 guns had been produced. The high-explosive shells were fuzed with the standard army No 208 mechanical time fuze, used with 3.7 and 4.5-inch anti-aircraft guns. The guns remained in service after World War II, and in 1953 11 guns were installed in Gibraltar.

Late in World War II, seven guns were mounted in Australia and three in New Guinea, in enclosed single-gun anti-aircraft/coast defence turrets.

== Specifications ==
- Bore Diameter: 5.25 inches (133 mm)
- Barrel Length: 6.668 m (50 calibres)
- Shell weight: 80 lbs (36.3 kg)
- Range: 24,070 yds (22,000 m) at 45 degrees
- Anti Aircraft Ceiling: 46,500 ft (14,170 m)
- Rate of Fire: Sustained 7–8 rpm, 18 RPM claimed for HMS Vanguard.
- Penetration: side armour: 3 inches (76 mm) 9,500 yards (8,690 m) or 11,900 m, depending on the sources; the gun was not capable of penetrating 2 inches (51 mm) of deck armour at any range
- Mounting weight: 78.7 metric tons (varied)
- Mounting elevation: -5 to +70 degrees
- Training & elevating speeds: 10 degrees per second and 20 degrees per second respectively, in RP10 mounts.

== Ammunition ==
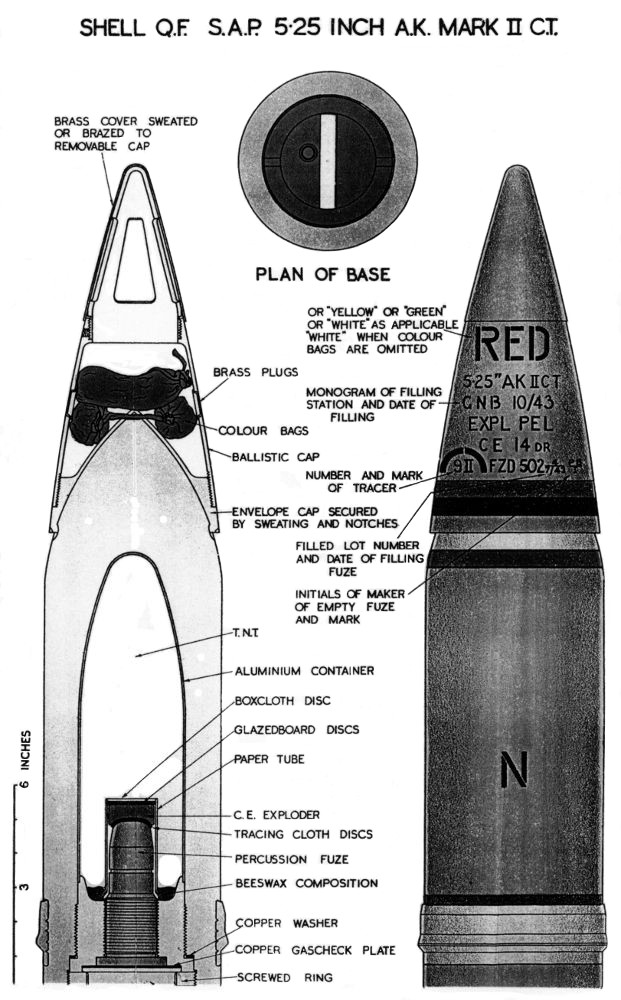
Mk II SAP (semi armour-piercing) shell

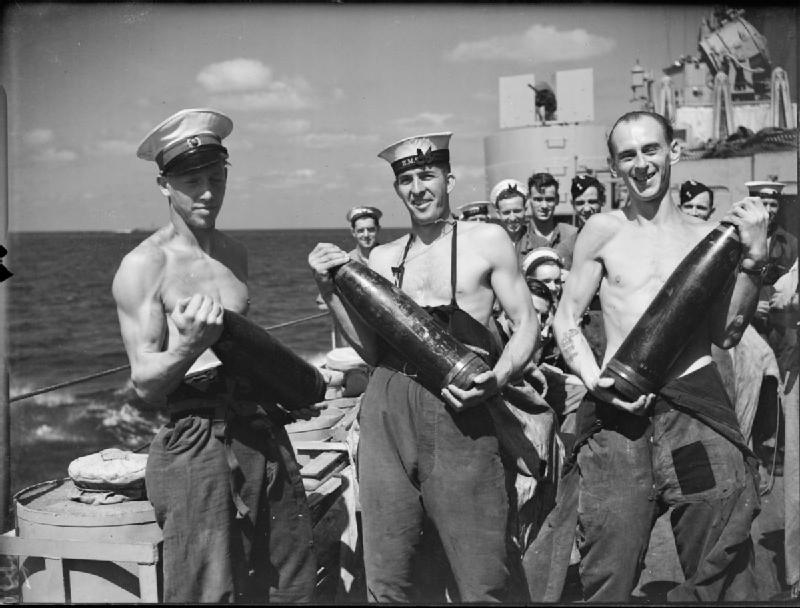
Crew of HMS Euryalus with shells, August 1942

== Surviving examples ==
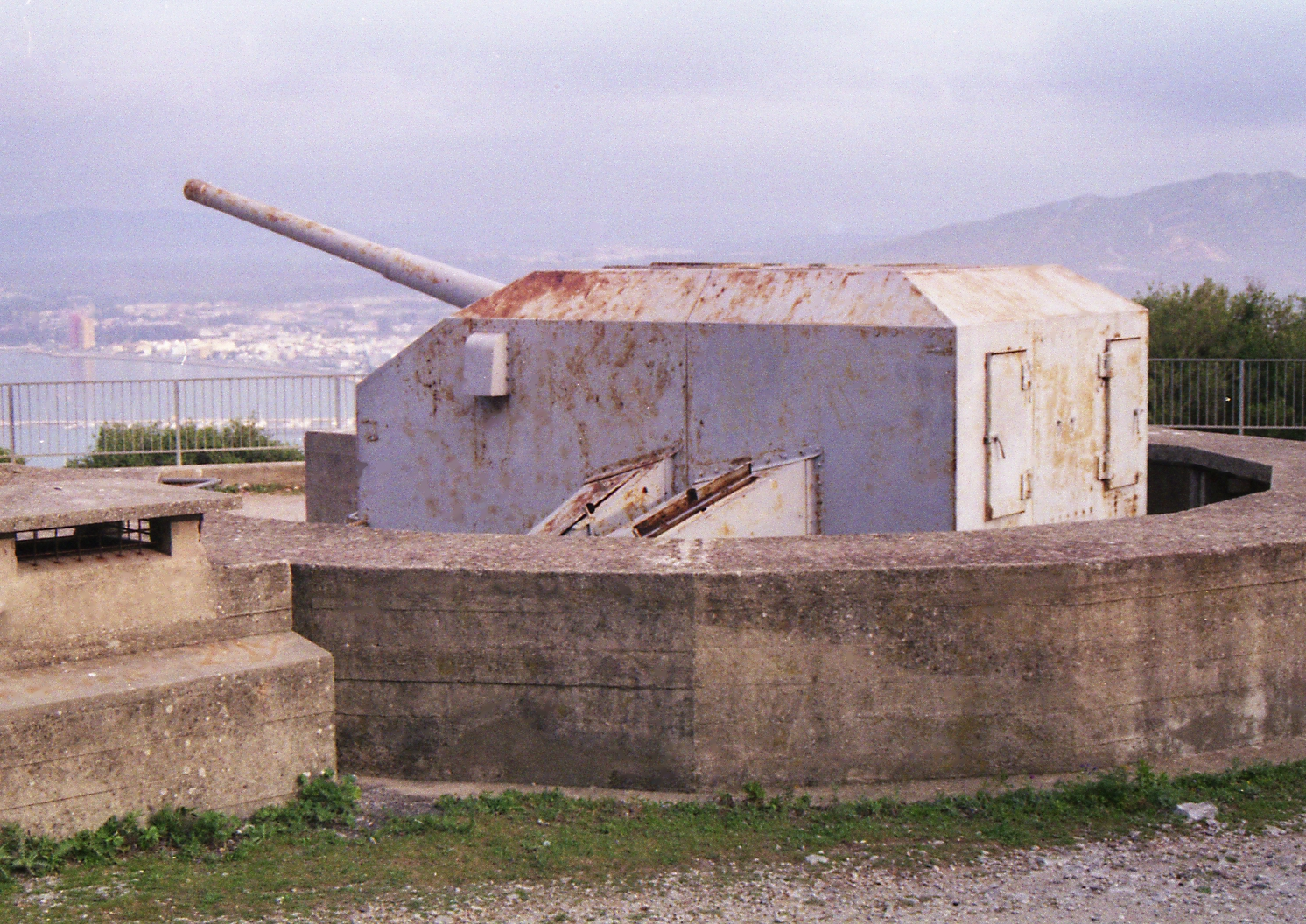
A preserved 5.25-in gun at Princess Anne's Battery, Gibraltar, the only intact battery of 5.25-inch AA guns anywhere in the world

- Princess Anne's Battery remains overlooking the sea at Gibraltar
- a turret originally from PNS Babur (ex HMS Diadem) is at the gate of Pakistan Navy Headquarters in Karachi

== See also ==
- List of naval guns

=== Weapons of comparable role, performance and era ===
- 12.8 cm FlaK 40, German heavy anti-aircraft gun firing lighter shell
- QF 4.5-inch naval gun, the Royal Navy's medium-calibre dual-purpose gun
- 5"/38 caliber gun, the main US Navy dual-purpose gun during World War II
- Canon de 138 mm Modèle 1929, French naval gun of similar size
- 135 mm /45 Italian naval gun, Italian naval gun of similar size

== Bibliography ==
- Brown, D.K.Nelson to Vanguard: Warship Design and Development 1923–1945
- Campbell, John, British Naval Guns 1880–1945 No 14" article in "Warship Volume VIII
- DiGiulian, Tony, Nav Weaps page
- Garzke, William H., Jr.; Dulin, Robert O., Jr. (1980). British, Soviet, French, and Dutch Battleships of World War II. London: Jane's. ISBN 0-7106-0078-X.
- Hogg, Ian V. 1998. Allied Artillery of World War Two. The Crowood Press: London. ISBN 1-86126-165-9
- Horner, David, The Gunners – A History of Australian Artillery. Allen & Unwin: St Leonards. ISBN 1-86373-917-3
- Ireland, Bernard, Jane's Battleships of the 20th Century
- The Gunnery Pocket Book
- Routledge, Brigadier NW. 1994. History of the Royal Regiment of Artillery – Anti-Aircraft Artillery 1914–55. Brassey's: London. ISBN 1-85753-099-3
- Sired, Ronald; edited by Flynn, F.C. 1957 Enemy engaged : a naval rating with the Mediterranean fleet, 1942–44 W. Kimber: London.
