= Tommy Brown (George Medal recipient) =

English NAAFI assistant (1926–1945)

Tommy Brown GM
- Born: c. 1926; North Shields, Northumberland
- Died: 13 February 1945 (aged 18–19); North Shields, Northumberland
- Burial place: Tynemouth (Preston) Cemetery
- Military career
- Allegiance: United Kingdom
- Branch: NAAFI; Royal Navy
- Service years: 1941–1942
- Rank: Senior Canteen Assistant; Leading Seaman
- Units: HMS Petard; HMS Belfast
- Conflicts: Second World War: Mediterranean and Middle East theatre; Mediterranean War; Sinking of German submarine U-559
- Awards: George Medal

Thomas William Brown GM (c. 1926 – 13 February 1945) was an English recipient of the George Medal, one of the youngest persons to have ever received that award. In October 1942, as a NAAFI canteen assistant, he was involved in the action between Petard and U-559, being one of three men to board the sinking submarine in an effort to retrieve vital documents, and was the only one of the three to survive. These documents greatly assisted Bletchley Park codebreakers in cracking the German Enigma code. After this heroic deed, it was revealed that he was underage to be at sea. He returned home to North Shields. In 1945 he died from injuries sustained while rescuing his sister Maureen from a house fire in North Shields Ridges Estate whilst on leave from HMS Belfast. His family were presented with his medal by King George VI in 1945, and later presented it to the NAAFI in 1985.

== NAAFI career ==
At the age of 15, Brown joined the NAAFI and was assigned as a Canteen Assistant onboard Petard, a P class destroyer, for service during World War II. Unlike other services, the NAAFI only accepted men from the age of 17 onwards, so Brown had to lie about his age to join.

On 30 October 1942, Petard was in the waters off the coast of Port Said, Egypt. They were being sent to relieve Hero, and to investigate radar contact with a submarine along with Pakenham, Dulverton, Hurworth, and Vickers Wellesley light bombers of No. 47 Squadron RAF. After ten hours of depth charge attacks, U-559 came to the surface, it being identified by its distinctive white donkey emblem on its conning tower. Petard fired her 4–inch guns at the submarine, causing such damage that the crew abandoned ship. Petard then launched a boarding party in a seaboat.

Lieutenant Francis Anthony Blair Fasson and Able Seaman Colin Grazier dived into the sea and swam to the submarine, with Brown following them over. The German crew had opened the boat's seacocks, and water was pouring into the vessel. The two Navy men made their way into the captain's cabin where Fasson found a set of keys. They unlocked drawers and found two code books: the Short Weather Cipher and Short Signal Book. Brown carried these documents up the iron ladder of the U-boat's conning tower to Petard's whaler, climbing with one hand while holding the documents in the other. After his third trip down and up the ladder, he called for his shipmates to get out of the boat, but the submarine sank before they could escape. Brown himself was dragged under with the submarine, but managed to fight his way back to the surface and was picked up by the whaler. He was promoted to Senior Canteen Assistant following the incident.

Due to the attention arising from his actions in the incident with U-559, his age became known to the authorities. That ended his posting aboard Petard, but he was not discharged from the NAAFI. He returned to his family in North Shields, and later returned to sea on board HMS Belfast. In 1945, when he was home on shore leave from Belfast, a fire broke out in the family home at North Shields. Brown died while attempting to rescue his youngest sister Maureen. He was buried with full military honours in Tynemouth Cemetery.

== Legacy ==
For their actions, Fasson and Grazier were posthumously awarded the George Cross. Brown was awarded the George Medal. His mother Margaret and brother Stanley travelled to London to receive his medal on his behalf after Brown's death in 1945. Prior to being told about the presentation ceremony, his mother hadn't been told that Brown had received a medal for his actions.

Unknown to Brown, the documents that he, Fasson, and Grazier retrieved were extremely valuable in breaking the German Enigma code. They allowed British codebreakers to attack the "Triton" key used by the U-boats, which had been invulnerable for nine months. Allied convoys in the Atlantic could be directed away from known U-boat locations. Winston Churchill wrote that the actions of the crew of Petard were crucial to the outcome of the war. Brown never knew the contents of those documents; information relating to Enigma was not released till decades after his death.

In 1985, his brothers Stan and David presented the NAAFI with Brown's medals, to be displayed at the Bletchley Park Museum of codebreaking in Buckinghamshire. In 1987, a stained glass window was dedicated to his memory in his home town at the Saville Exchange building. The museum has since closed, and Brown's medals are now on display at the NAAFI headquarters in Darlington. They were brought there to celebrate the 90th anniversary of the NAAFI in April 2010, with a ceremony being held to celebrate the return of Brown's medal to the North East. In attendance were five of his siblings, Lillian, Sylvia, Norman, Nancy, and Albert.

== Memorials ==
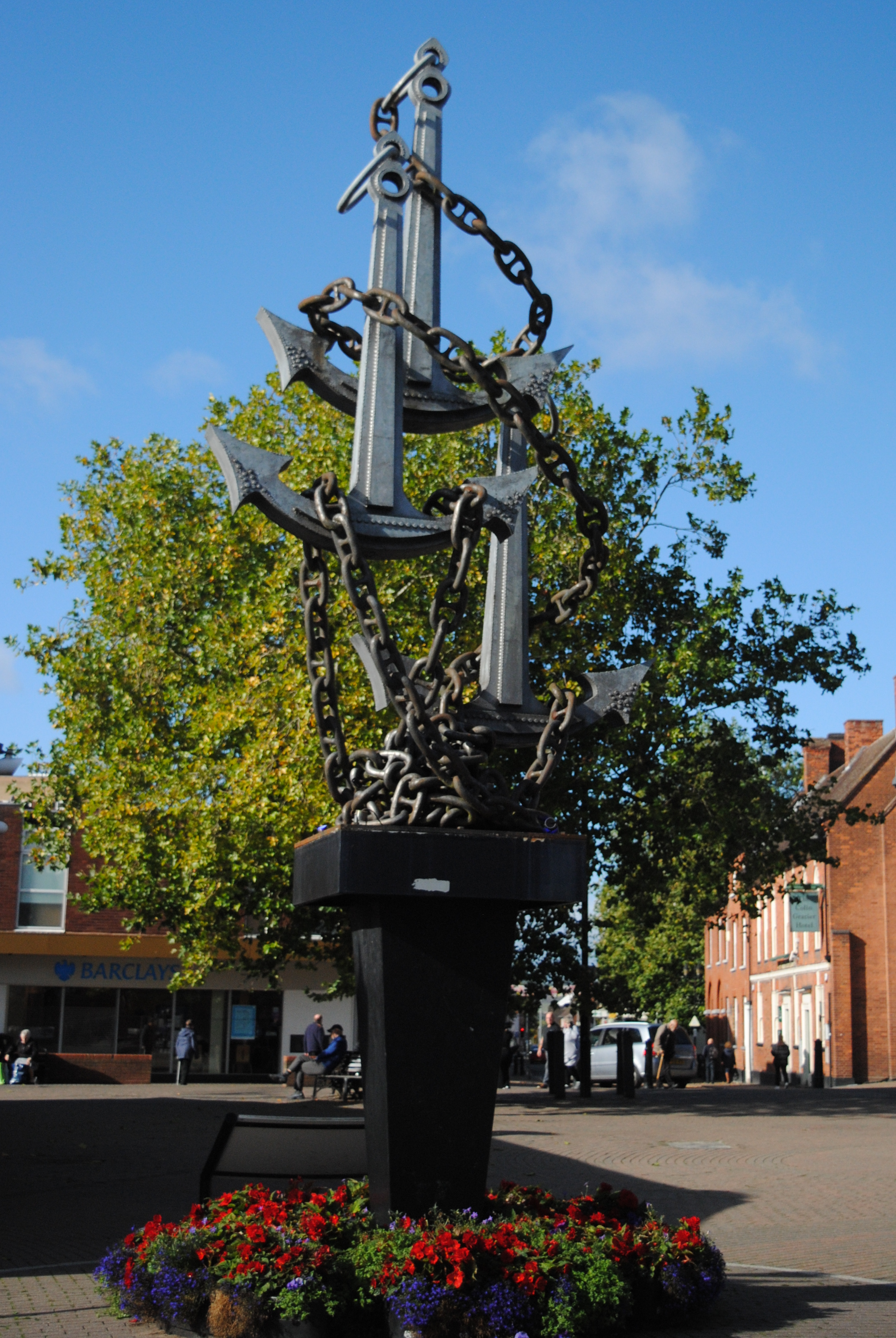
Memorial to Brown, Fasson and Grazier in Tamworth, Staffordshire

Brown, Fasson and Grazier are each commemorated with an anchor on the (pictured) memorial statue in Grazier's hometown of Tamworth, Staffordshire. Created by the Polish scupltor Walenty Pytel, it was unveiled on the 60th anniversary of their capture of U-559's secret materials.

The museum at Bletchley Park has an audio visual exhibit dedicated to bravery of Brown, Fasson and Grazier.

== See also ==
- John Leake (DSM)
