= Battle of the Messina Convoy =

1943 naval battle

- Part of the Battle of the Mediterranean in the Second World War
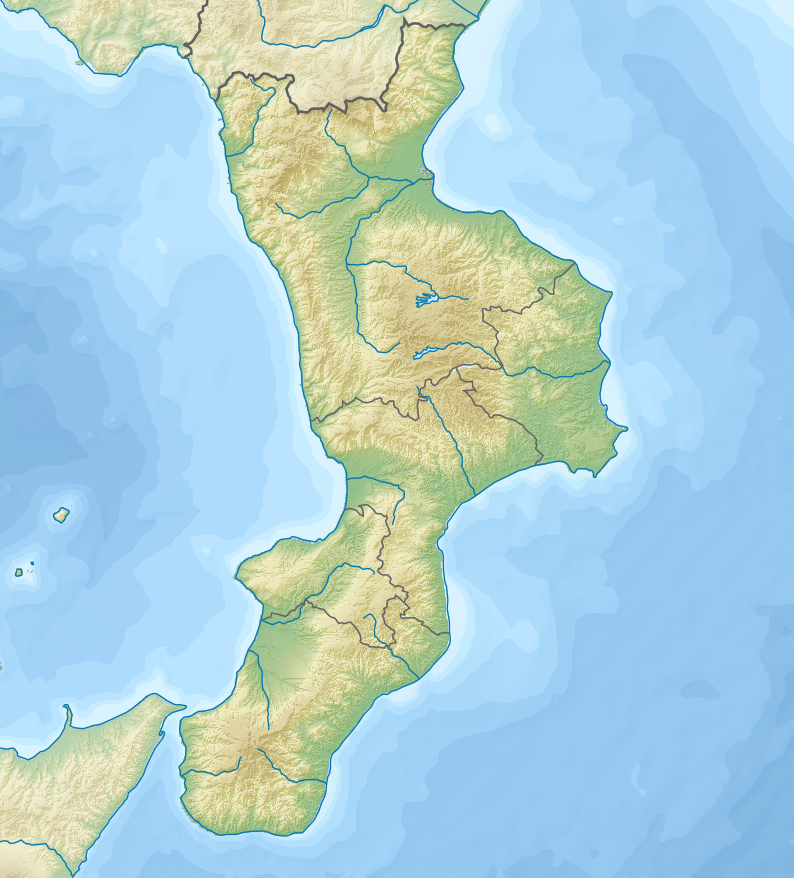
- Battle of the Messina Convoy (Calabria)
Date	Night 1/2 June 1943
Location	Cape Spartivento on the Calabrian coast
Result	Inconclusive

Belligerents
United Kingdom; Greece	Italy

Commanders and leaders
Tony Pugsley; Georgios Blessas	Marino Fasan †

Strength
HMS Jervis; Vasilissa Olga; 1 Wellington bomber	Castore; Freighters: Postumia; Vragnizza

Casualties and losses
	Castore sunk; 2 freighters damaged

The Battle of the Messina Convoy was a naval action fought on the night of 1/2 June 1943 off the Calabrian coast, near Cape Spartivento. The action was between the Allied destroyers HMS Jervis and Greek destroyer Vasilissa Olga of the 14th Destroyer Flotilla and an Italian convoy of the merchant ships Vragnizza and Postumia, escorted by the Italian torpedo boat Castore. The merchant ships managed to slip away but Castore sank a couple of hours after the engagement.

On the fast return of the destroyers towards Malta, to get inside the range of Allied fighter cover, Vaasilissa Olga suffered a mechanical failure and was stopped for an hour while effecting repairs but the destroyers returned undamaged. The merchant ships, Castore and another torpedo boat (which was not present) were claimed sunk.

== Background ==
=== Italian coastal traffic ===
Despite the defeat in North Africa, Italian coastal and island traffic retained its importance, against which, the Royal Navy conducted offensive operations, assisted by signals intelligence derived from code breaking. The British learned from decrypts that a convoy was at sea, sailing from Taranto to Messina.

=== Allied naval operations ===
Naval preparations for the Allied invasion of the Italian island of Pantelleria had begun with bombardments on 12 to 13 May by HMS Orion which it repeated on 31 May with the destroyers HMS Petard and Troubridge. On 1 June, Penelope and the destroyers Paladin and Petard, repeated the bombardment, Penelope being damaged by Italian coastal guns. On 1 June, the British destroyer HMS Jervis (Captain Anthony Pugsley) and the Greek destroyer Vasilissa Olga ( Lieutenant-Commander Georgios Blessas) of the 14th Destroyer Flotilla sailed from Malta. Not long after their departure, Pugsley, who was not aware of Ultra, the British code-breaking effort, received a signal that a southbound convoy was moving off the foot of Italy (Calabria). After checking the distance, Pugsley decided that there was just enough time to attack the convoy and get close enough to Malta by dawn to benefit from air cover.

== Battle ==
On the night of 1/2 June, clear with calm seas, the destroyers carried out a night search along the Gulf of Squillace, by sailing to the furthest position that the convoy could have reached and turning on to a reciprocal course. At 1:34 a.m., off Cape Spartivento, they found two small merchant ships (carrying supplies and munitions) and turned to close the range. An ASV Wellington bomber dropped flares when instructed from the ships. At 2,000 yd (1,800 m), the Allied destroyers engaged the Italian freighter Vragnizza (1,592 GRT) with their 4.7-inch guns, seeing a 'dull red glow'. After the eighth salvo, the destroyers shifted aim to Postumia (595 GRT). The escort vessel, Castore (Lieutenant-Commander Marino Fasan) that had been ahead of the merchantmen, turned back to protect the ships, its first shells passing over the two destroyers. Jervis changed target and claimed hits with its first salvo, Castore laid smoke and turned away. The destroyers sailed into the smoke and until 1 nmi (1.9 km; 1.2 mi) off shore but lost contact with the convoy. The Wellington continued to drop flares and Pugsley saw Castore turning to bring its torpedoes to bear. Jervis, followed by Vasilissa Olga, turned onto the opposite course and hit Castore at the stern with gunfire, damaging its steering gear, the ship sinking at 3:15 a.m.

== Aftermath ==
=== Analysis ===
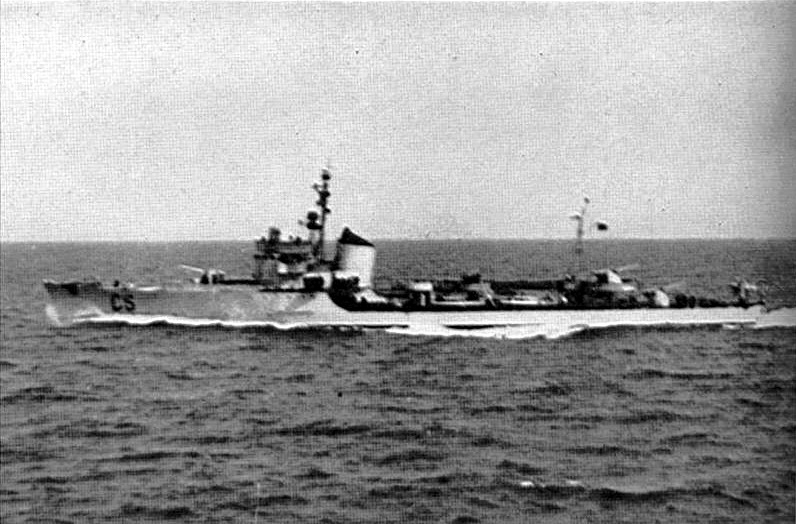
Cassiopea, another example of a Spica-class torpedo boat

Jervis fired 142 rounds of 4.7-inch ammunition and a torpedo during the action. As the destroyers sped back to Malta, Vasilissa Olga had engine-trouble and came to a stop for an hour for boiler repairs but both ships reached Malta safely at 2:35 p.m. on 2 June. The destroyers claimed the merchant ships and another escort, a torpedo boat X137, along with Castore but this was a mistake, there was no second escort. The freighters, albeit damaged, reached Messina.

=== Subsequent operations ===
On the night of 2/3 June, Orion, Paladin and Troubridge continued the bombardment campaign against Pantellaria, followed on 3 June by the destroyers HMS Ilex and Isis. On 5 June the cruiser HMS Newfoundland and the destroyers Paladin and Troubridge bombarded the island, followed by the cruisers HMS Aurora, Euryalus, Newfoundland, Orion and Penelope with the destroyers Jervis, Laforey, Lookout, Loyal, Nubian, Tartar, Troubridge and Whaddon with the Motor torpedo boats MTB 73, MTB 77 and MTB 84. The naval bombardments and the dropping of 6,200 long tons (6,300 t) of bombs by the Allied air forces led to the landing by troops of the 1st Division being unopposed.

== Orders of battle ==
=== Allied ===
14th Destroyer Flotilla
Name	Flag	Type	Notes
HMS Jervis	Royal Navy	J-class destroyer	
Vasilissa Olga	Royal Hellenic Navy	G-class destroyer	

=== Italian ===
Convoy escort
Name	Flag	Type	Notes
Castore	Kingdom of Italy	Spica-class torpedo boat	Sunk

Merchant ships
Name	Year	Flag	GRT	Notes
Postumia		Merchant Navy	595	Damaged
Vragnizza		Merchant Navy	1,592	Damaged

== Bibliography ==
- Brown, David (1995) [1990]. Warship Losses of World War Two (2nd rev. ed.). London: Arms and Armour Press. ISBN 978-1-85409-278-6.
- O'Hara, Vincent P. (2009). Struggle for the Middle Sea: The Great Navies at War in the Mediterranean Theater, 1940–1945. Annapolis, MD: Naval Institute Press. ISBN 978-1-61251-408-6.
- Rohwer, Jürgen; Hümmelchen, Gerhard (2005) [1972]. Chronology of the War at Sea, 1939–1945: The Naval History of World War Two (3rd rev. ed.). London: Chatham Publishing. ISBN 1-86176-257-7.
