= Saverio Marotta =

Italian naval officer (1911–1943)

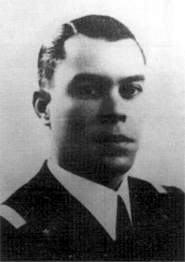
- Born: 4 September 1911; Falconara Marittima, Marche, Italy
- Died: 4 May 1943 (aged 31); Mediterranean Sea
- Military career
- Allegiance: Kingdom of Italy
- Branch: Regia Marina
- Service years: 1929–1943
- Rank: Lieutenant commander
- Commands: Perseo (torpedo boat)
- Conflicts: Spanish Civil War; World War II; Battle of the Mediterranean; Battle of the Campobasso Convoy
- Awards: Gold Medal of Military Valor (posthumous); Silver Medal of Military Valor (twice); Bronze Medal of Military Valor (twice)

Saverio Marotta (4 September 1911 – 4 May 1943) was an Italian naval officer during World War II known for his actions in command of the torpedo boat Perseo. Previously, he had been stationed on several cruisers during the Spanish Civil War and early World War II, starting as an ensign and working his way up to his final rank of lieutenant commander. After being put in command of the Perseo in August 1942, he took part in at least two actions of note against a numerically superior foe, the defence of the D'Annunzio, and the steamer Campobasso. He was wounded in action in the defence of the Campobasso, later drowning attempting to reboard his sinking vessel. He was awarded the Gold Medal of Military Valor for his efforts in defending the Campobasso.

== Biography ==
Marotta was born in Falconara Marittima (Province of Ancona) on 4 September 1911. He joined the Italian Naval Academy in Livorno in 1929, and in 1933 he graduated an ensign. In 1934, he was promoted to sub-lieutenant; after serving for more than a year on the light cruiser Alberico da Barbiano, in 1935 he was assigned on the heavy cruiser Trento, taking part in 1936-1937 in the naval operations related to the Spanish Civil War. He then attended the Advanced Course in Livorno and obtained the patent of fire direction officer.

After the beginning of World War II, from November 1940 to August 1942, Marotta served on the light cruiser Luigi Cadorna, where he was promoted to lieutenant and participated in numerous combat missions in the Mediterranean. In August 1942, he was given command of the torpedo boat Perseo, carrying out numerous convoy escort missions. While in command of Perseo, he was promoted to lieutenant commander on 1 January 1943 and was mentioned three times in the War Bulletins. On 16 January 1943, Perseo clashed with the British destroyers Nubian and Kelvin in the Sicilian Channel, while trying to protect the freighter D'Annunzio en route from Tripoli to Italy. Despite Perseo's defence, the merchant was set afire and sunk, and the torpedo boat itself was forced to retreat after suffering heavy damage.

On the evening of 3 May 1943 Perseo sailed from Pantelleria headed for Tunis, escorting the steamer Campobasso. Around midnight, the two ships were suddenly attacked by the British destroyers Nubian, Petard and Paladin. Marotta reacted boldly to the attack and, while under heavy artillery fire, twice tried to counterattack with torpedoes, until Perseo was disabled and he himself was seriously wounded by shrapnel, losing an arm. Campobasso was also set afire and later sunk. With his ship reduced to a helpless wreck, Marotta gave the few survivors the order to abandon ship; he then passed out from blood loss and was carried to a raft by his men. Regaining consciousness on the raft, he tried to go back aboard Perseo, but he fell into the water and drowned while trying to reboard his sinking ship. He was posthumously awarded the Gold Medal of Military Valor.
