= HMAS Parramatta (U44) =

Grimsby-class sloop of the Royal Australian Navy

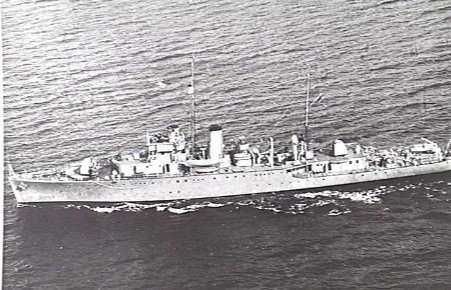
- HMAS Parramatta

History

Australia
- Namesake: The Parramatta River
- Builder: Cockatoo Island Dockyard
- Laid down: 9 November 1938
- Launched: 10 June 1939
- Commissioned: 8 April 1940
- Honours and awards: Battle honours:'; Libya 1941; Plus two inherited honours
- Fate: Torpedoed and sunk on 27 November 1941

General characteristics
- Class & type: Grimsby-class sloop
- Displacement: 1,060 tons (standard), 1,515 tons (full load)
- Length: 266 ft (81 m)
- Beam: 36 ft (11 m)
- Draught: 7 ft 6 in (2.29 m)
- Propulsion: Parsons, steam turbines, 2 shafts. 2,000 shp
- Speed: 16.5 knots (30.6 km/h; 19.0 mph)
- Complement: 135
- Armament: 3 × QF 4-inch (101.6 mm) Mk XVI anti-aircraft guns; 4 × 3-pounder guns; 1 × machine-gun; 2 × depth charge throwers; 2 × twin tubes for 21 in (530 mm) torpedoes

HMAS Parramatta (U44) was a Grimsby-class sloop of the Royal Australian Navy (RAN). Built during the late 1930s, Parramatta operated in the Red Sea and Mediterranean during World War II. The sloop was torpedoed by the German submarine U-559 on 27 November 1941, and sank off Tobruk with 138 of the 162 personnel aboard.

== Construction ==
Parramatta was laid down on 9 November 1938 at the Cockatoo Island Dockyard at Sydney, New South Wales. She was launched on 10 June 1939 and commissioned into the Royal Australian Navy (RAN) on 8 April 1940.

== Operational history ==
Parramatta was assigned to the Red Sea Force in July 1940, and arrived in Aden at the month's end. The majority of the ship's duties were escorting convoys. The sloop was later transferred to the Mediterranean Fleet.

While in the Mediterranean, Parramatta was one of several warships, nicknamed the Tobruk Ferry Service, used to supply and support the Allied forces besieged at Tobruk. While operating off Tobruk on 24 June 1941, Parramatta, the British sloop HMS Auckland, and the petrol carrier Pass of Balmaha were attacked by over 70 dive bombers. The Australian warship shot down three aircraft during the engagement without receiving major damage, but Auckland was sunk. Parramatta later helped recover the 164 survivors.

== Loss ==
Early in the morning of 27 November 1941, Parramatta was escorting transports resupplying the Allied garrison at Tobruk, when she was hit by a single torpedo from U-559 under the command of Hans Heidtmann. The damage was so significant that the sloop's captain only had time to order 'abandon ship' before Parramatta rolled to starboard and sank at 32°20′N 24°35′E. Only 24 aboard survived, with 138 killed.

The sloop's wartime service was later recognised by the battle honour "Libya 1941".
