= Vasilissa Olga =

Vasilissa Olga, Greek for "Queen Olga," may refer to:

- Olga Constantinovna of Russia (1851–1926), Queen consort of the Hellenes (1867–1913) and Regent of Greece (1920)
- Greek ship Vasilissa Olga, more than one ship of the Hellenic Navy
