= Battle of the Campobasso Convoy =

1943 naval battle of World War II

- Part of the Battle of the Mediterranean of the Second World War
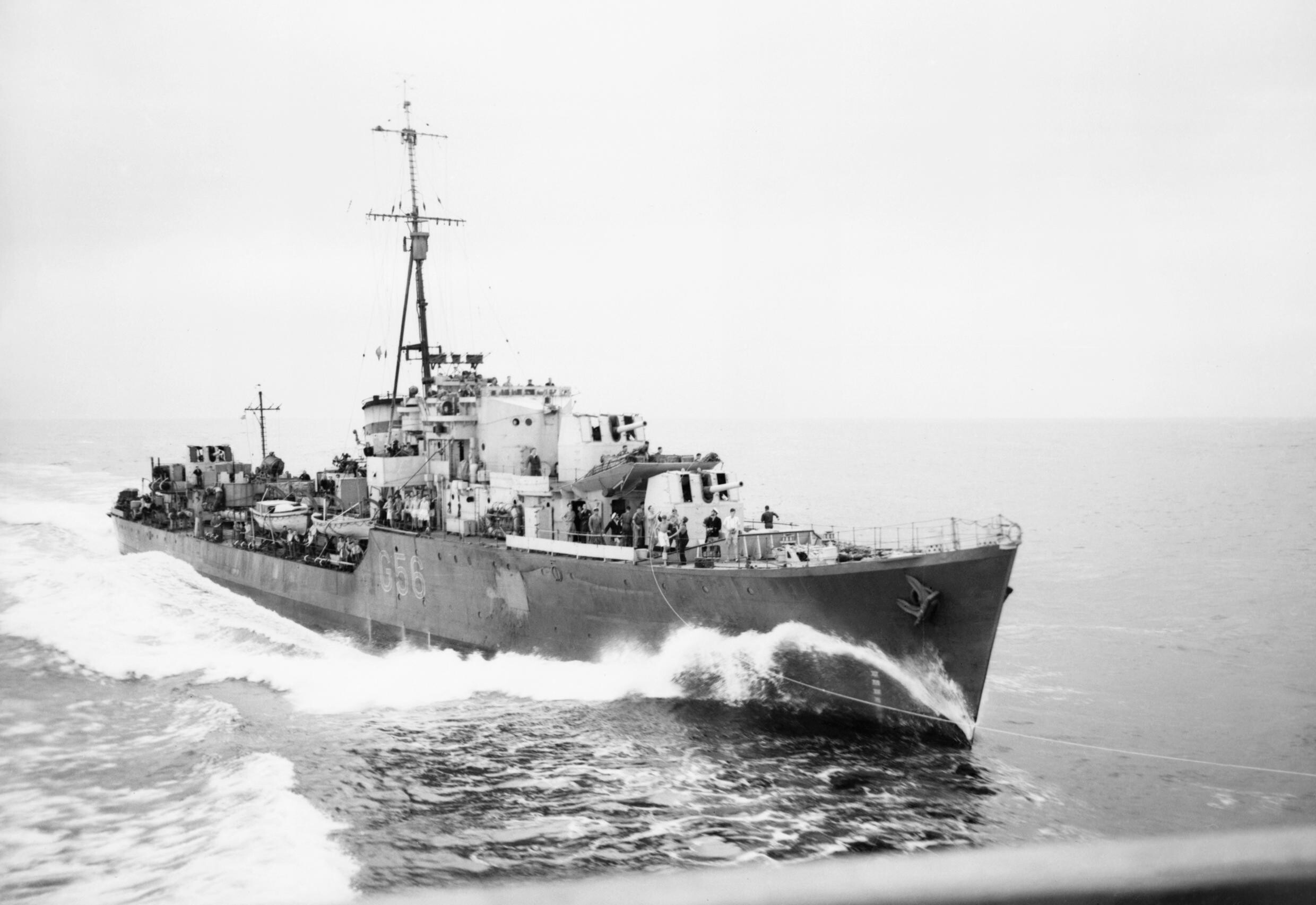
- HMS Petard photographed from HMS Formidable, December 1943
Date	3–4 May 1943
Location	Off Cape Bon, Mediterranean Sea 36°45′N 10°45′E
Result	British victory

Belligerents
United Kingdom	Italy

Commanders and leaders
Deric Holland-Martin	Saverio Marotta †

Strength
3 destroyers	1 torpedo boat; 1 merchantman

Casualties and losses
Nil	Marina mercantile italiana: 76 men killed; Regia Marina: 133 men killed; Total killed: 209; 103 men rescued; 1 torpedo boat sunk; 1 merchantman sunk

The Battle of the Campobasso Convoy was a naval engagement between three British destroyers and the Regia Marina (Italian Royal Navy) Spica-class torpedo boat Perseo that took place off Cape Bon in the Mediterranean Sea on the night of 3/4 May 1943. The Italians were escorting the 3,566-gross register ton (GRT) freighter Campobasso to Tunisia.

East of Kelibia in Cape Bon, the ships were illuminated by star shells by the British destroyers HMS Nubian, HMS Paladin and HMS Petard. Perseo attacked the British ships with torpedoes then turned to the north-west.

Campobasso exploded under the British bombardment that, with more star shells, lit up Perseo and it was severely damaged, sinking an hour later. The 73 crew of Campobasso killed and 20 survived, of the 133 crew on Perseo, 50 were killed and 83 were rescued.

== Background ==
Towards the end of the North Africa campaign the destroyers HMS Paladin and Nubian of Force K patrolled the waters off Cape Bon. On the night of 29/30 April, the destroyers made a sweep along the south coast of Sicily and encountered the merchant ship Fauna (575 GRT) escorted by German E-boats. The British destroyers sank Fauna without loss.

== Prelude ==
A few days later, alerted by signals intelligence, Nubian, Paladin and Petard, were sent to wait in ambush for an Italian convoy. The Italian merchant ship Campobasso (3,566 GRT) had left Pantelleria island at 19:00 on 3 May, loaded with bombs, land-mines, motor transport and other supplies to the Axis forces in Tunisia. The ship was joined by its escort, the Italian torpedo boat Perseo (Captain Saverio Marotta) soon after departure.

The two ships undertook a winding course through the Axis and Allied minefields. On the night of 3/4 May off Kelibia on the Cape Bon peninsula, the British destroyers picked up radar contacts of vessels heading towards the Tunisian coast. Perseo, equipped with a Metox radar detector, was alerted to the transmissions from the British destroyers and signalled a warning to Supermarina, the headquarters of the Regia Marina, that the convoy had been found.

== Action ==
The Cape Bon peninsula; Kelibia is at the eastern extremity

At 23:35, star shells burst overhead when the Italian ships were about 7 nmi (13 km; 8.1 mi) east of Kelibia (Cape Bon) and Campobasso was hit soon after and caught fire. After the action a crewman on Perseo wrote

Remembering the previous 15 January everyone knew what would happen; immediately the torpedo boat turned towards the enemy to launch.

Perseo launched its two starboard torpedoes from 700 yd (640 m) then sailed at full speed north-west towards Cape Bon. Campobasso exploded at 23:48, illuminating Perseo. The British ships fired more star shells and Perseo began abrupt evasive action until 23:52 when its rudder suffered a mechanical fault. Before the crew could steer manually, the hull was hit by two shells then more hits were received on the bridge and the engine rooms.

Steam escaped from the hull and covered the deck as the engines stopped. The British destroyers came as close as 500 yd (460 m), firing their main guns and anti-aircraft armament. At 23:58 Marotta ordered the ship to be abandoned. Perseo remained afloat for about an hour, when the magazine exploded and the ship sank by the stern at 01:00. The next day the Italian hospital ship Principessa Giovanna picked up four survivors from Campobasso and twenty men reached the coast in a lifeboat; the hospital ship rescued 67 men from Perseo. On 6 May, Principessa Giovanna was damaged by Allied aircraft, with casualties of 54 men killed and 52 wounded.

== Aftermath ==
=== Casualties ===
The crew of Campobasso suffered 73 fatal casualties out of the crew of 93 men; the complement of Perseo suffered 133 fatalities and 83 men were rescued; Marotta was among those killed.

=== Subsequent operations ===
A second convoy that night, led by the Ciclone-class torpedo boat escort Tifone, loaded with aviation spirit, sailed with the merchant ship Belluno to Tunis from Trapani and managed to evade the British destroyers, after witnessing the destruction of Campobasso. The Belluno convoy arrived on 4 May and was the last Axis supply run to reach Africa. On 4 May SS Sant'Antonio, escorted by the torpedo boats Groppo and Calliope, departed from Naples and on 7 May three German vessels, KT.5, KT.9 and KT.21 departed from Trapani but of these ships only Belluno survived the journey.

==== Operation Retribution ====
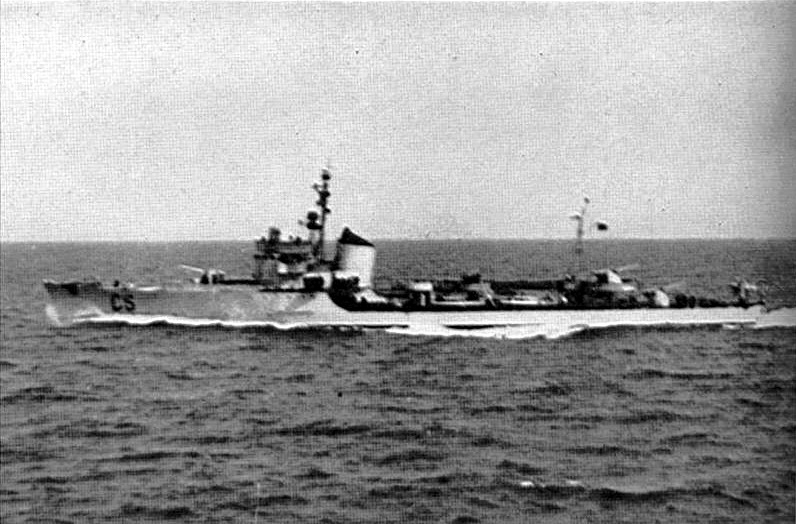
Cassiopea, another Spica-class torpedo boat

As Axis airfields in Tunisia were captured, Allied fighters could escort ships in the seas between Tunisia and Sicily, making day patrols feasible. Allied convoys along the coast and to Malta were stopped to divert their escorts to the blockade of Tunisia. Aircraft were to attack Axis ships within 5 nmi (5.8 mi; 9.3 km) of the Tunisian shore and beyond the limit Allied ships would have freedom of movement. British mines had been timed to sink in early May and intelligence on Axis minefields was judged sufficient to risk sailing in some areas.

From the night of 8/9 May, Paladin, with Jervis, Petard and Nubian, from Force K bombarded Kelibia and maintained a daylight blockade off Cape Bon with Force Q based at Bône (now Annaba), which comprised HMS Laforey, Loyal, Tartar and ORP Błyskawica with the Hunt-class destroyers HMS Zetland, Lamerton, Aldenham, Hursley, Wilton, Dulverton, Lauderdale and the Greek destroyer RHS Kanaris but had to paint their superstructures red to avoid attacks by friendly aircraft.

British Motor Gun Boats, Motor Torpedo Boats and US PT boats patrolled closer inshore at night. Allied superiority was so great that Supermarina decided that an evacuation attempt would be futile. Sporadic attempts were made by personnel in Tunisia to flee; after 7 May, the German KT 22, some Axis torpedo boats and MAS boats (Motoscafo armato silurante) were the only vessels to run the blockade. By the Axis surrender, the blockading vessels had taken 800 prisoners. (Note: Rohwer and Hümmelchen (2005) recorded 700 prisoners.)

== Italian order of battle ==
=== Campobasso convoy ===
Convoyed ship
Ship	Flag	GRT	Notes
Campobasso	Marina mercantile italiana	3,566	Sunk

Escort
Ship	Flag	Type	Notes
Perseo	Kingdom of Italy	Spica-class torpedo boat	Sunk

== Allied order of battle ==
Force K
Ship	Flag	Type	Notes
HMS Nubian	Royal Navy	Tribal-class destroyer	
HMS Paladin	Royal Navy	P-class destroyer	
HMS Petard	Royal Navy	P-class destroyer	
