= Hans Heidtmann =

German U-boat commander in World War II

- Born: 8 August 1914
- Died: 5 April 1976 (aged 61)
- Military career
- Allegiance: Nazi Germany; West Germany
- Branch: Kriegsmarine; German Navy
- Service years: 1934–1942; 1958–1972
- Rank: Kapitänleutnant (Kriegsmarine); Kapitän zur See (Bundesmarine)
- Commands: U-14; U-2; U-559
- Conflicts: World War II
- Awards: Knight's Cross of the Iron Cross

Hans Heidtmann (8 August 1914 – 5 April 1976) was a German U-boat commander in World War II and recipient of the Knight's Cross of the Iron Cross from Nazi Germany.

U-559 under the command of Heidtmann came under attack by several British warships and an aircraft on 30 October 1942. Fatally damaged and forced to the surface, the U-boat was abandoned after being scuttled in the Mediterranean. A British boarding party, consisting of Lieutenant Francis Anthony Blair Fasson, Able Seaman Colin Grazier, and Canteen Assistant Tommy Brown, from destroyer HMS Petard recovered the cryptographic materials, but the U-boat sank before the Enigma cipher machine could be brought out. Eight German crewmen and two British seamen were lost, and 37 German survivors were taken as prisoner of war.

== Awards ==
- Wehrmacht Long Service Award 4th Class (8 April 1938)
- Spanish Cross in Bronze with Swords (6 June 1939)
- Sudetenland Medal (16 September 1939)
- U-boat War Badge (1939) (26 November 1939)
- Iron Cross (1939) 2nd Class (27 November 1939) & 1st Class (23 September 1941)
- Knight's Cross of the Iron Cross on 12 April 1943 as Kapitänleutnant and commander of U-559

Military offices
Preceded by Fregattenkapitän Gerd Schreiber	Commander of the Marinestützpunktkommando Wilhelmshaven; April 1964 – September 1965	Succeeded by Kapitän zur See Karl-Heinz Wünn
