= Colin Grazier =

Royal Navy seaman (1920–1942)

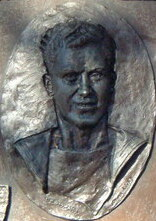
- Grazier, as depicted on the memorial in Tamworth
- Born: 7 May 1920; Two Gates, Warwickshire, England
- Died: 30 October 1942 (aged 22); Mediterranean Sea
- Military career
- Allegiance: United Kingdom
- Branch: Royal Navy
- Service years: 1940–1942
- Rank: Able Seaman
- Service number: P/SSX 25550
- Unit: HMS Petard
- Conflicts: Second World War: Mediterranean and Middle East theatre; Mediterranean War; Sinking of German submarine U-559 †
- Awards: George Cross

Colin Grazier, GC (7 May 1920 – 30 October 1942) was a sailor in the Royal Navy who was posthumously awarded the George Cross for the "outstanding bravery and steadfast devotion to duty in the face of danger" which he displayed on 30 October 1942 in action in the eastern Mediterranean when capturing codebooks vital for the breaking of the German naval "Shark" Enigma cipher from the sinking German submarine U-559.

== Early life ==
Grazier was born at Two Gates in Tamworth, the son of Colin Grazier and his wife, Margaret Twynham. He was educated locally and joined the Royal Navy as soon as the Second World War began. He served on HMS Petard.

Grazier married Olive M. Grazier just before going to war. They lived at 211 Tamworth Road in Kingsbury, Warwickshire.

== 30 October 1942 ==
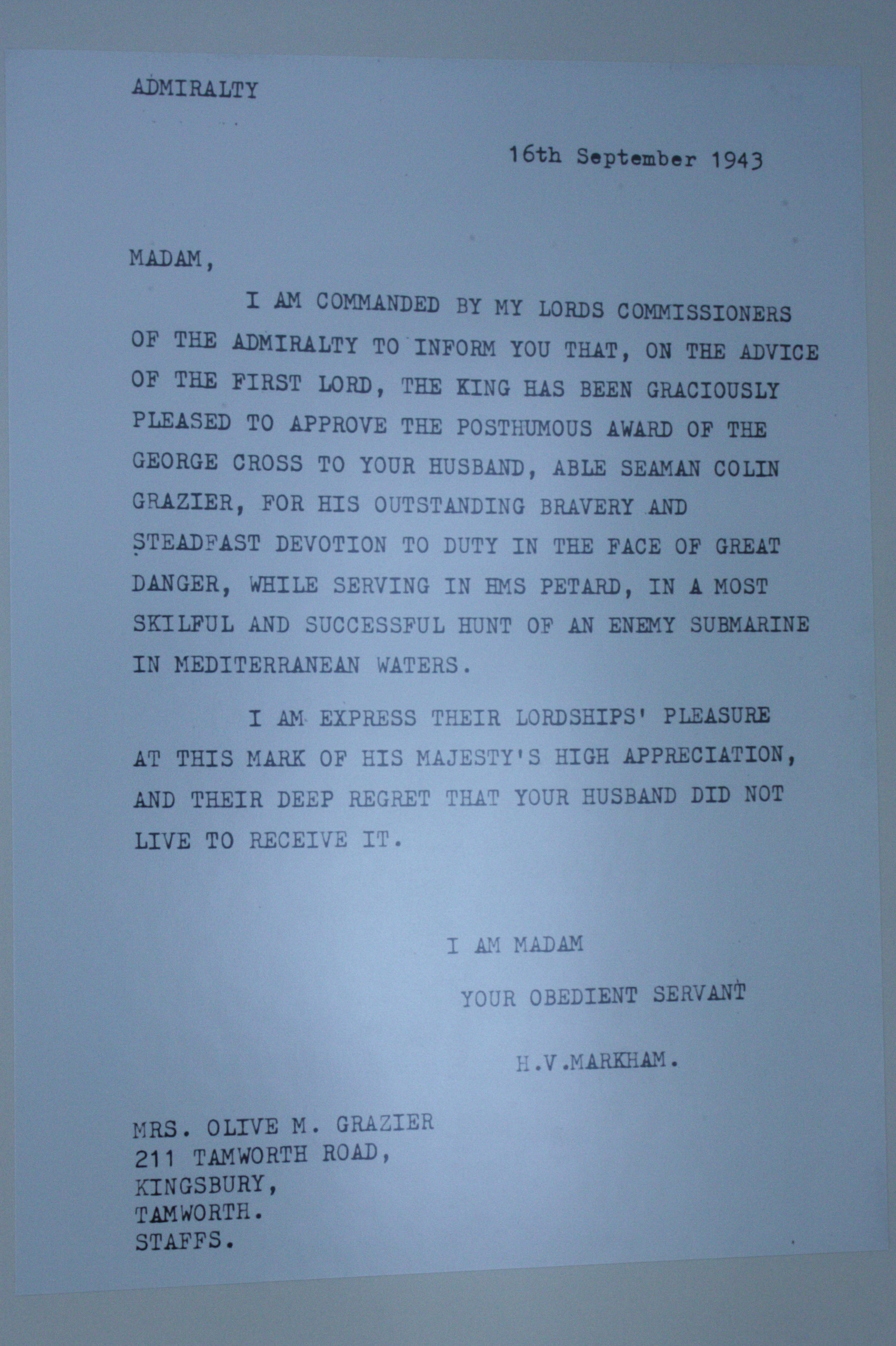
The telegram from the Admiralty to Mrs Olive Grazier, Bletchley Park Museum

On the night of 30 October 1942, an enemy submarine was reported 70 nautical miles (130 km) north of Port Said. The destroyers Pakenham, Petard, Dulverton, Hero, and Hurworth were ordered to proceed from Alexandria to relieve Echo who had been searching for the submarine (which was German U-boat U-559).

HMS Petard, assisted by Wellesley aircraft of No. 47 Squadron, located the U-boat and attacked with depth charges for nearly ten hours and finally forced the stricken boat to the surface at around 22:40. The U-boat was caught in Petard's search-lights, and the German crew, with Kapitänleutnant (Captain) Hans Heidtmann, were taken on board under guard, but not before they had opened sea valves and petcocks in order to scuttle the submarine before abandoning it. HMS Petard now sought volunteers to swim over and search the damaged submarine. Lieutenant Francis Fasson said that he would go aboard.

Fasson stripped off his clothes and jumped into the cold sea. Colin Grazier also volunteered and followed him across. The two men were then joined by 16-year-old NAAFI canteen assistant Tommy Brown, and they began the task of searching the rapidly sinking U-boat for any vital documents, code books or machinery.

The two senior men, Fasson and Grazier, entered the submarine and passed all the information they could get their hands on to Brown, who was waiting on the conning tower. Suddenly the submarine lurched and slipped beneath the waves, taking Grazier and Fasson with it. Both men were drowned. Their daring mission remained a secret for over 30 years due to the Official Secrets Act.

== George Cross citation ==
The awards of the George Cross to Fasson and Grazier were published in the London Gazette on 14 September 1943.

The King has been graciously pleased to approve the posthumous award of the George Cross to: – Lieutenant Anthony Blair Fasson, Royal Navy. Able Seaman Colin Grazier, P/SSX.25550 – for outstanding bravery and steadfast devotion to duty in the face of danger.

— London Gazette

The medal is on display at the National War Museum at Edinburgh Castle.

== Legacy ==
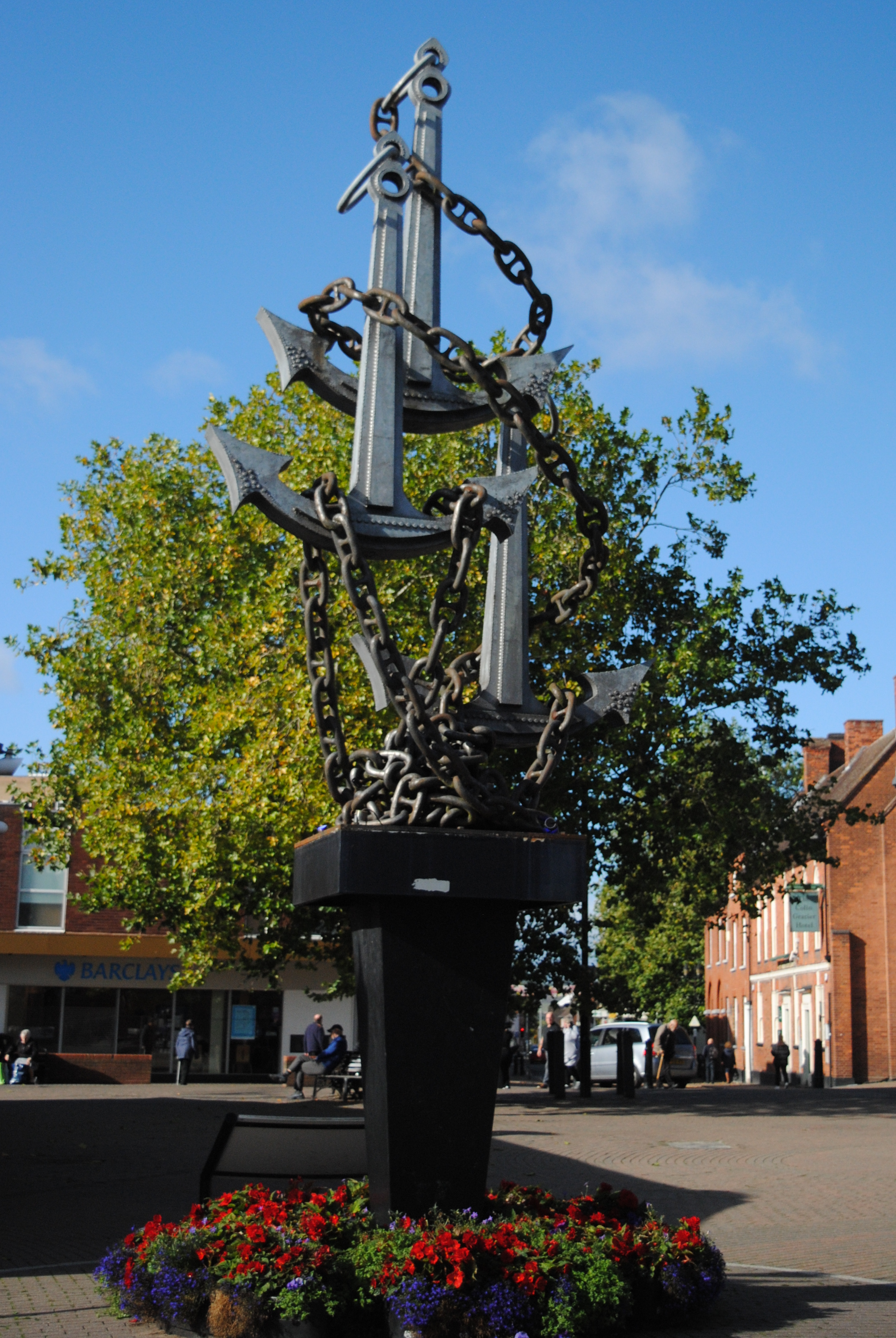
The Colin Grazier Memorial in Tamworth, Staffordshire

Fasson and Grazier had managed to pass out the vital code books that reached Bletchley Park on 24 November 1942. They proved to be the Discriminant Book Wetterkurzschlüssel (short weather key) and Kurzsignalheft Kurzsignalheft (short signals) code books, which yielded priceless information in breaking the U-boat Enigma codes. Convoys could now be rerouted to avoid wolfpacks and losses were halved in January and February, 1943.

In Grazier's home town of Tamworth, there is an avenue, an office block, and a hotel named after him. The hotel contains a gallery of photographs. In October 2002, a commemorative sculpture was unveiled in Tamworth to honour Grazier and his two colleagues involved in the capture of documents from U-559. The sculpture, the work of Polish sculptor Walenty Pytel, takes the form of three anchors, and the date of the unveiling was chosen to coincide with the 60th anniversary of the action against U-559.

The museum at Bletchley Park has a section dedicated to his memory.
