= Italian submarine Uarsciek =

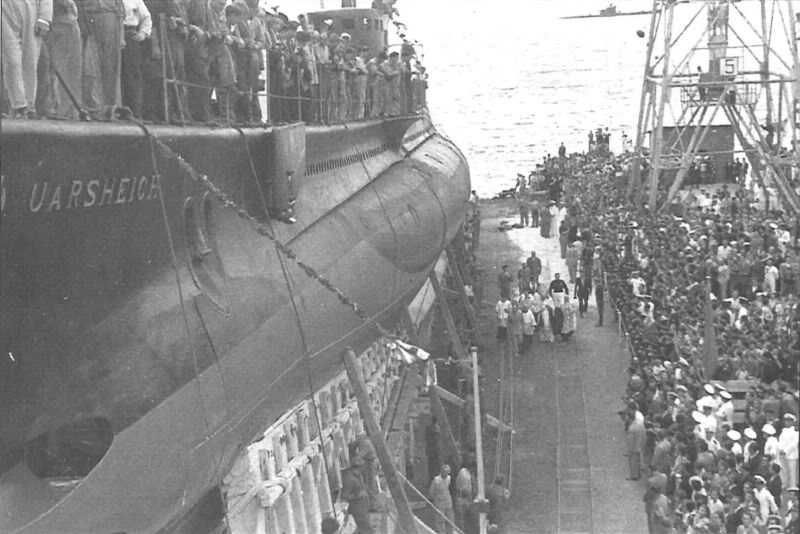
- RIN Uarsciek

History

Kingdom of Italy
- Name: Uarsciek
- Namesake: Uarsciek
- Builder: Tosi, Taranto
- Laid down: 2 December 1936
- Launched: 19 November 1937
- Commissioned: 4 December 1937
- Fate: Sunk, 15 December 1942

General characteristics
- Class & type: 600-Serie Adua-class submarine
- Displacement: 680 long tons (691 t) surfaced; 844 long tons (858 t) submerged
- Length: 60.28 m (197 ft 9 in)
- Beam: 6.45 m (21 ft 2 in)
- Draught: 4.64 m (15 ft 3 in)
- Installed power: 1,400 hp (1,000 kW) (diesels); 800 hp (600 kW) (electric motors)
- Propulsion: Diesel-electric; 2 × Tosi diesel engines; 2 × Marelli electric motors
- Speed: 14 knots (26 km/h; 16 mph) surfaced; 7.5 knots (13.9 km/h; 8.6 mph) submerged
- Range: 3,180 nmi (5,890 km; 3,660 mi) at 10.5 kn (19.4 km/h; 12.1 mph) surfaced; 74 nmi (137 km; 85 mi) at 4 kn (7.4 km/h; 4.6 mph) submerged.
- Test depth: 80 m (260 ft)
- Complement: 44 (4 officers + 40 non-officers and sailors)
- Armament: 1 × 100 mm (4 in) / 47 caliber deck gun; 2 x 1 – 13.2 mm (0.52 in) anti-aircraft guns; 6 × 533 mm (21 in) torpedo tubes (4 forward, 2 aft); 12 × torpedoes

Italian submarine Uarsciek was an Adua-class submarine built for the Royal Italian Navy (Regia Marina) during the 1930s. It was named after a village in Somalia which housed a coast guard station during the period of Italian colonial control.

== Design and description ==
The Adua-class submarines were essentially repeats of the preceding Perla class. They displaced 680 long tons (690 t) surfaced and 844 long tons (858 t) submerged. The submarines were 60.18 meters (197 ft 5 in) long, had a beam of 6.45 meters (21 ft 2 in) and a draft of 4.7 meters (15 ft 5 in).

For surface running, the boats were powered by two 600-brake-horsepower (447 kW) diesel engines, each driving one propeller shaft. When submerged each propeller was driven by a 400-horsepower (298 kW) electric motor. They could reach 14 knots (26 km/h; 16 mph) on the surface and 7.5 knots (13.9 km/h; 8.6 mph) underwater. On the surface, the Adua class had a range of 3,180 nautical miles (5,890 km; 3,660 mi) at 10.5 knots (19.4 km/h; 12.1 mph), submerged, they had a range of 74 nmi (137 km; 85 mi) at 4 knots (7.4 km/h; 4.6 mph).

The boats were armed with six internal 53.3 cm (21.0 in) torpedo tubes, four in the bow and two in the stern. One reload torpedo was carried for each tube, for a total of twelve. They were also armed with one 100 mm (4 in) deck gun for combat on the surface. The light anti-aircraft armament consisted of one or two pairs of 13.2 mm (0.52 in) machine guns.

== Construction and career ==
Uarsciek was one of the few submarines built by Tosi shipyard. It entered the service in December of 1937 and was assigned to Tobruk where she spent 1938 and 1939, conducting drills and undergoing training. It was delivered with the incorrect name spelling of Uarsheich which was subsequently corrected to Uarsciek around mid-March of 1938. At the beginning of World War II she was assigned along with other submarines to screen the Greek-Albanian-Yugoslav coast. After a series of patrols around the Greek islands she returned to Taranto without making any significant sightings. By then, Uarsciek was assigned to 46th Squadron (IV Submarine Group) based out of Taranto.

On 12 September 1940, under command of captain Carlo Zanchi, she was sent on an ambush mission to the coast of Egypt, but the mission had to be aborted when several crew members became poisoned by mercury vapors, so the commander, instead of returning to Taranto decided to direct the ship to Benghazi, where he landed the entire crew for hospitalization on 21 September 1940.

Between 1 and 10 February 1941, Uarsciek and Turchese again patrolled off the Greek and Albanian coast but sighted no enemy vessels. She again patrolled in the same area between 2 and 17 March 1941.

During the battle Crete, between 19 May and 2 June 1941, Uarsciek together with many other submarines was deployed as a defensive screen to cover an area between Crete, Sollum and Alexandria.

At 1:40 on 14 June 1941 Uarsciek, under the command of Captain Raffaello Allegri, identified a group of enemy units while patrolling off Philippeville. Uarsciek launched three torpedoes, but without inflicting any damage to enemy units.

Between 19 and 31 July, together with Axum and Squalo, she patrolled off Alexandria, but again without any success. From 15 October 1941 she was stationed off Cyrenaica.

During the Italian North Africa supply operation "V.5" in March 1942, Uarschiek together with several other submarines was deployed east of Malta in a defensive cover.

From mid-June to mid-August of 1942 she participated in several counter-operations against British units in the Mediterranean (Operation "Harpoon", Operation "Pedestal"), but without much success. During Operation Harpoon Uarschiek together with several other submarines was stationed north of Algerian coast. On 13 June 1942 she sighted the ships of Force X and attempted an attack, but it proved to be unsuccessful. At 4:38 on 11 August 1942 Uarsciek, now under the command of captain Gaetano Arezzo della Targia, sighted and attacked British aircraft carrier HMS Furious with three torpedoes, but attack was unsuccessful. She was then depth charged for several hours but managed to come out unscathed and surfaced at 9:30. On 13 August 1942, in the evening, she was attacked by an aircraft, damaged and forced to return. For this action and above all for the aggressive spirit with which the new captain had led his ship in this attack on the British convoy, Gaetano Arezzo della Targia was decorated with the Silver Medal of Military Valor.

On 16 November 1942 the submarine transported 19 tons of ammunition to Tobruk and continued patrolling along the Egyptian coast. She had to spend some time in Tripoli undergoing some minor repairs.

In early December of 1942 the submarine resumed her sea operations, now part of the X Submarine Subgroup out of Augusta. Uarsciek and Topazio were assigned to screen and protect an important convoy (MV Foscolo) scheduled for transit in the Central Mediterranean and headed to Tripoli.

On 11 December 1942, at 17:25, the submarines sailed from Augusta due south towards Malta to attack the K-force of the British Navy. On 15 December 1942, at 03:00, Uarsciek, while sailing, surfaced sighted an enemy formation, two cruisers and three destroyers, and immediately attacked it by firing 2 stern torpedoes and crash-diving. Destroyers HMS Petard and Vasilissa Olga dodged the torpedoes and attacked the submarine with depth charges.

Unfortunately for Uarsciek, a mistake was made during her crash dive as she descended far lower than expected, down to almost 160 metres (twice the test depth). To correct the situation, air ballast was blown, but another mistake was made as the amount of blown air was too excessive and Uarsciek came almost all the way up to the surface, with her conning tower protruding above the water. The destroyers lost no time in hitting her with depth charges. Owing to heavy damage, and flooding sustained by the boat, the captain decided to surface and try to engage the destroyers with the deck gun. But before he was able to do anything, the boat was hit by a barrage of fire from anti-aircraft guns of Petard and Vasilissa Olga. This action left captain Arezzo della Targia, his second in command, and 16 other people dead. Petard also accidentally rammed Uarsciek.

There exists an alternative version of events from Petard's physician Dr. William Prendergast, and also some Uarsciek survivors. After a first burst, that killed two officers and some other men and effectively stopped the crew from using the deck gun, the commander of the English destroyer, Lt. Commander Mark Thornton, took over a machine gun and opened fire on the survivors who were surrendering. Allegedly, he believed that would help to capture the submarine and all her secret documents and codes before her crew could scuttle the submarine. At the same time he ordered his crew to do the same (an order that was carried out very reluctantly by the men of Petard, so much so that it had to be repeated twice).

A British boarding party and an Italian engineer went over and tried to stabilize Uarsciek, so she could be taken in tow by the destroyer. However, the towline parted and an attempt by an Italian engineer to straighten her rudder resulted in Uarsciek losing buoyancy. At 11:33 Uarsciek's bow reared up vertical and she went down stern first to the bottom of the Mediterranean in the position 35°40′N 14°32′E.
