= Greek ship Vasilissa Olga =

At least two ships of the Hellenic Navy have borne the name Vasilissa Olga (Greek: Βασίλισσα Όλγα) after Queen Olga of Greece:

- Greek ironclad Vasilissa Olga, an armoured corvette launched in 1870 and scrapped in 1925.
- Greek destroyer Vasilissa Olga, a destroyer launched in 1938 and sunk in 1943
