= Greek destroyer Vasilissa Olga =

Greek G and H-class destroyer

- Vasilissa Olga in the pre-war disruptive camouflage pattern

History

Greece
- Name: Vasilissa Olga (ΒΠ Βασίλισσα Όλγα)
- Namesake: Queen Olga
- Ordered: 29 January 1937
- Builder: Yarrow & Company
- Laid down: 1 February 1937
- Launched: 2 June 1938
- Commissioned: 4 February 1939
- Fate: Sunk 26 September 1943

General characteristics (as built)
- Class & type: G and H-class destroyer
- Displacement: 1,371 t (1,349 long tons) (standard); 1,879 t (1,849 long tons) (deep load)
- Length: 97.5 m (319 ft 11 in) (o/a)
- Beam: 9.7 m (31 ft 10 in)
- Draft: 2.7 m (8 ft 10 in)
- Installed power: 34,000 shp (25,000 kW); 3 Admiralty 3-drum boilers
- Propulsion: 2 shafts; 2 geared steam turbines
- Speed: 36 knots (67 km/h; 41 mph)
- Range: 3,760 nmi (6,960 km; 4,330 mi) at 20 knots (37 km/h; 23 mph)
- Complement: 162
- Armament: 4 × single 12.7 cm (5 in) guns; 4 × single 3.7 cm (1.5 in) AA guns; 2 × quadruple 1.27 cm (0.5 in) AA machine guns; 2 × quadruple 53.3 cm (21 in) torpedo tubes; 2 × depth charge launchers and 1 depth charge rack

Vasilissa Olga (Greek: ΒΠ Βασίλισσα Όλγα) (Queen Olga) was the second and last destroyer of her class built for the Royal Hellenic Navy in Great Britain before the Second World War. She participated in the Greco-Italian War in 1940–1941, escorting convoys and unsuccessfully attacking Italian shipping in the Adriatic Sea. After the German invasion of Greece in April 1941, the ship escorted convoys between Egypt and Greece until she evacuated part of the government to Crete later that month and then to Egypt in May. After the Greek surrender on 1 June, Vasilissa Olga served with British forces for the rest of her career.

She escorted convoys in the Eastern Mediterranean for the next several months before she was sent to India for a refit. The ship resumed convoy escort duties upon its completion at the beginning of 1942 in the Mediterranean and the Red Sea. In December of that year, now operating in the Central Mediterranean, Vasilissa Olga and a British destroyer briefly captured an Italian submarine, but it sank while under tow. The following month, the ship, together with a pair of British destroyers, sank a small Italian transport ship. She was briefly tasked to escort an Australian troop convoy in the Red Sea in February 1943 before returning to the Mediterranean. Together with a British destroyer, Vasilissa Olga sank at least two ships from an Italian convoy in June. Over the next several months, she escorted British ships as the Allies invaded Sicily (Operation Husky) and mainland Italy (Operation Avalanche).

The ship was transferred back to the Eastern Mediterranean in September to participate in the Dodecanese Campaign. Together with two British destroyers, she helped to destroy a small German convoy in the islands before beginning to ferry troops and supplies to the small British garrison on the island of Leros. After completing one such mission, she was sunk by German bombers in Lakki harbor on 26 September with the loss of 72 men.

== Design and description ==
The Vasilefs Georgios-class ships were derived from the British G-class destroyers, modified with German guns and fire-control systems. They had an overall length of 98.4 meters (322 ft 10 in), a beam of 10.05 meters (33 ft 0 in), and a draft of 2.51 meters (8 ft 3 in). They displaced 1,371 metric tons (1,349 long tons) at standard load and 1,879 metric tons (1,849 long tons) at deep load. The two Parsons geared steam turbine sets, each driving one propeller shaft, were designed to produce 34,000 shaft horsepower (25,000 kW) using steam provided by three Admiralty three-drum boilers for a designed speed of 36 knots (67 km/h; 41 mph). During her sea trials on 19 December 1938, Vasilissa Olga reached a speed of 36.1 knots (66.9 km/h; 41.5 mph) from 33,683 shp (25,117 kW), although her armament was not yet installed. The ships carried a maximum of 399 metric tons (393 long tons) of fuel oil which gave a range of 3,760 nautical miles (6,960 km; 4,330 mi) at 20 knots (37 km/h; 23 mph). Their crew consisted of 162 officers and crewmen. Unlike her sister ship Vasilefs Georgios, Vasilissa Olga was not fitted out to accommodate an admiral and his staff.

The ships carried four 12.7-centimeter (5.0 in) SK C/34 guns in single mounts with gun shields, designated 'A', 'B', 'X' and 'Y', from front to rear, one pair each superfiring forward and aft of the superstructure. Her anti-aircraft (AA) armament consisted of four 3.7-centimeter (1.5 in) guns in four single mounts amidships and two quadruple mounts for Vickers 0.5 in (12.7 mm) AA machineguns. The Vasilefs Georgios class carried eight above-water 53.3-centimeter (21 in) torpedo tubes in two quadruple mounts. They had two depth charge launchers and a single rack for their 17 depth charges.

=== Wartime modifications ===
During her late 1941 refit in Calcutta, India, Vasilissa Olga's armament was revised to better suit her role as a convoy escort. The rear set of torpedo tubes was replaced by a 3-inch (76.2 mm) AA gun and 'Y' gun was removed to increase the number of depth charge throwers and depth charge stowage. To reduce topweight, the 3.7 cm guns were replaced by 20 mm (0.8 in) Oerlikon autocannon. Her mainmast was removed and her aft funnel shortened to improve the arcs of fire of her AA guns. The ship was fitted with a Type 128 Asdic to improve her ability to detect submarines.

== Construction and service ==
The Vasilefs Georgios-class ships were ordered on 29 January 1937 as part of a naval rearmament plan that was intended to include one light cruiser and at least four destroyers, one pair of which were to be built in Britain and the other pair in Greece. Vasilissa Olga was laid down at Yarrow & Company's shipyard in Scotstoun, Scotland, in February 1937, launched on 2 June 1938, and commissioned on 4 February 1939 without her armament, which was installed later in Greece.

After the Delfino sank the elderly protected cruiser Elli in a sneak attack on 15 August 1940 off the island of Tinos, Vasilissa Olga and her sister were sent to Tinos to escort the merchant ships there home. During the Greco-Italian War she escorted convoys and participated in raids against Italian lines of communication in the Strait of Otranto on the nights of 14/15 November 1940 and 4/5 January 1941 that failed to locate any ships. The sisters ferried the Greek gold reserves to Crete on 1 March.

After the German invasion of Greece on 6 April, the sisters began to escort convoys between Greece and Egypt via Crete. On 22 April, Vasilissa Olga was ordered to evacuate elements of the Greek government to Crete, including Vice Admiral Alexandros Sakellariou who was the Minister for Naval Affairs, Chief of the Navy General Staff and Deputy Prime Minister. The following month she proceeded to Alexandria, Egypt, and then escorted convoys in the Eastern Mediterranean before departing for India to be modernized on 9 October.

The refit was completed on 5 January 1942 and the ship escorted convoys in the Arabian and Red Seas before arriving back in Alexandria on 22 February. Together with the British destroyer HMS Jaguar, Vasilissa Olga was escorting the oil tanker RFA Slavol off Mersa Matruh, Egypt, when they detected and unsuccessfully attacked the German submarine U-652 on 26 March. Later that day, the submarine sank both Jaguar and Slavol. Vasilissa Olga ran aground in early May while escorting a convoy between Alexandria and Tobruk and damaged her propellers. After repairs the ship was transferred to the Indian Ocean where she escorted convoys there and in the Red Sea until December when she returned to the Mediterranean.

On 14 December, Vasilissa Olga and the destroyer HMS Petard forced the Italian submarine Uarsciek to the surface off Malta. The submarine's crew was unable to scuttle their boat and it was taken in tow, although it later sank. The following month, on the night of 18/19 January 1943, Vasilissa Olga, along with the destroyers HMS Pakenham and HMS Nubian, intercepted and sank the 475-gross register ton (GRT) Italian freighter SS Stromboli off the Libyan coast. The following month, the ship was assigned to escort the ocean liners transporting the Australian Army's 9th Division home from Egypt (Operation Pamphlet) as they passed through the Red Sea between 7 and 24 February.

On 2 June, during the preparatory stages of Operation Corkscrew (the Allied invasion of the Italian island of Pantelleria), Vasilissa Olga and the destroyer HMS Jervis fought the Battle of the Messina Convoy, sinking its lone escort, the torpedo boat Castore off Cape Spartivento. The convoy, however, managed to limp away. The following month, the ship was assigned to escort the ships of the British Covering Force in the Ionian Sea during Operation Husky and later bombarded Catania, Sicily. After the Italian armistice on 8 September, Vasilissa Olga was one of the ships that escorted Italian ships to Malta on 10 September. The next day, she returned to Italian waters to escort the ships involved in Operation Avalanche.

The ship was transferred to the Eastern Mediterranean to support British forces involved in the Dodecanese Campaign in the Aegean Sea less than a week later, arriving at Alexandria on 16 September. On the night of 17/18 September, she engaged a German convoy off the coast of Stampalia, together with the destroyers HMS Faulknor and HMS Eclipse, sinking the transports Pluto and Paula and forced the crew of the escorting whale catcher, Uj 2104, to beach itself. Vasilissa Olga transported 36 long tons (37 t) of supplies and 300 men of the Queen's Own Royal West Kent Regiment from Haifa, Palestine, to reinforce the British garrison on Leros. After another supply run, she was sunk by Junkers Ju 88 bombers of LG 1 in Lakki on the morning of 26 September, with the loss of 72 men.

== Bibliography ==
- Freivogel, Zvonimir (2003). "Vasilefs Georgios and Vasilissa Olga: From Sister-Ships to Adversaries". Warship International. XL (4): 351–64. ISSN 0043-0374.
- Friedman, Norman (2009). British Destroyers From Earliest Days to the Second World War. Annapolis, Maryland: Naval Institute Press. ISBN 978-1-59114-081-8.
- Rohwer, Jürgen (2005). Chronology of the War at Sea 1939–1945: The Naval History of World War Two (Third Revised ed.). Annapolis, Maryland: Naval Institute Press. ISBN 1-59114-119-2.
- Whitley, M. J. (1995). Cruisers of World War Two: An International Encyclopedia. London: Cassell. ISBN 1-86019-874-0.
- Smith, Peter C. (2004). Destroyer Leader: The Story of HMS Faulknor 1935–46 (3rd revised and expanded ed.). Barnsley, UK: Pen & Sword Maritime. ISBN 1-84415-121-2.
- Whitley, M. J. (1988). Destroyers of World War Two: An International Encyclopedia. Annapolis, Maryland: Naval Institute Press. ISBN 0-87021-326-1.
