= Tony Fasson =

Royal Navy officer (1913–1942)

Francis Anthony Blair Fasson
- Born: 17 July 1913; Lanton, Scotland
- Died: 30 October 1942 (aged 29); Mediterranean Sea
- Military career
- Allegiance: United Kingdom
- Branch: Royal Navy
- Rank: Lieutenant
- Nickname: Tony
- Units: HMS Rodney; HMS Salamander; HMS Shoreham; HMS Windsor; HMS Hostile; HMS Petard
- Conflicts: Second World War: Mediterranean and Middle East theatre; Mediterranean War; Sinking of German submarine U-559 †
- Awards: George Cross; Mentioned in Despatches

Lieutenant Francis Anthony Blair Fasson, GC (17 July 1913 – 30 October 1942), known as Tony Fasson, was a Royal Navy officer. He was posthumously awarded the George Cross "for outstanding bravery and steadfast devotion to duty in the face of danger" when, on 30 October 1942 in action in the Mediterranean Sea, he captured codebooks vital for the breaking of the German naval "Shark" Enigma cipher from the sinking German submarine U-559.

== Early life ==
Fasson was born in the village of Lanton, Roxburghshire, the son of Francis Hamilton Fasson, a captain of the Scottish Horse, and Lilias Clara Fasson (née Bruce). His uncle Robert Robertson Fasson was a commander in the Royal Navy.

== Naval career ==
Fasson was educated at Jedburgh Grammar School, and entered the Royal Navy on 6 September 1930, serving aboard the battleship Rodney as a midshipman until June 1933. Promoted to acting-sub-lieutenant on 1 September 1933, he attended the Royal Naval College, Greenwich and received promotion to sub-lieutenant on 16 May 1934, before being assigned to the light cruiser Curacoa on 5 January 1935.

On 15 September 1935, Fasson was attached to the Royal Air Force with the temporary rank of flying officer to train as a pilot at the No. 1 Flying Training School, RAF Leuchars. He returned to the navy on 16 June 1936 and joined the minesweeping sloop HMS Salamander (J86) on 18 July, receiving promotion to lieutenant on 16 September. From 19 April 1937 he served aboard the escort vessel Shoreham in the East Indies, before joining the destroyer Windsor as first lieutenant on 5 August 1938.

Fasson was appointed first lieutenant of the destroyer Hostile on 20 July 1939, and saw action aboard her on 10 April 1940 during the First Battle of Narvik, after which he received a Mention in Despatches. In early 1941 Fasson was posted to HMS Nile, the naval headquarters in Alexandria, Egypt, finally returning to sea duty in March 1942 as first lieutenant of the destroyer Petard.

=== Death ===
On 30 October 1942 Petard, in conjunction with the destroyers Pakenham and Hero, the escort destroyers Dulverton and Hurworth, and a Sunderland flying boat of No. 47 Squadron RAF based in Port Said, attacked and badly damaged the German submarine U-559. The crew of the U-559 abandoned their vessel, with 7 dead and 38 survivors.

Fasson and Able Seaman Colin Grazier, along with NAAFI canteen assistant Tommy Brown, jumped from the Petard to the deck of the U-559 and entered the sinking submarine, which had water pouring in through seacocks left open by the Germans. Working in complete darkness, fully aware that the submarine could sink without warning at any time, Fasson and Grazier located documents, which Brown carried up to men in a whaler. They continued searching until the submarine suddenly foundered – "sank like a stone," drowning Fasson and Grazier; Brown survived. Fasson and Grazier were subsequently awarded the George Cross, while Brown received the George Medal. The awards were published in the London Gazette on 14 September 1943.

The codebooks that Fasson, Grazier, and Brown retrieved were immensely valuable to the code-breakers at Bletchley Park, who had been unable to read U-boat Enigma for ten months. The captured material allowed them to read the cyphers for several weeks, and to break U-boat Enigma thereafter.

== Memorials ==
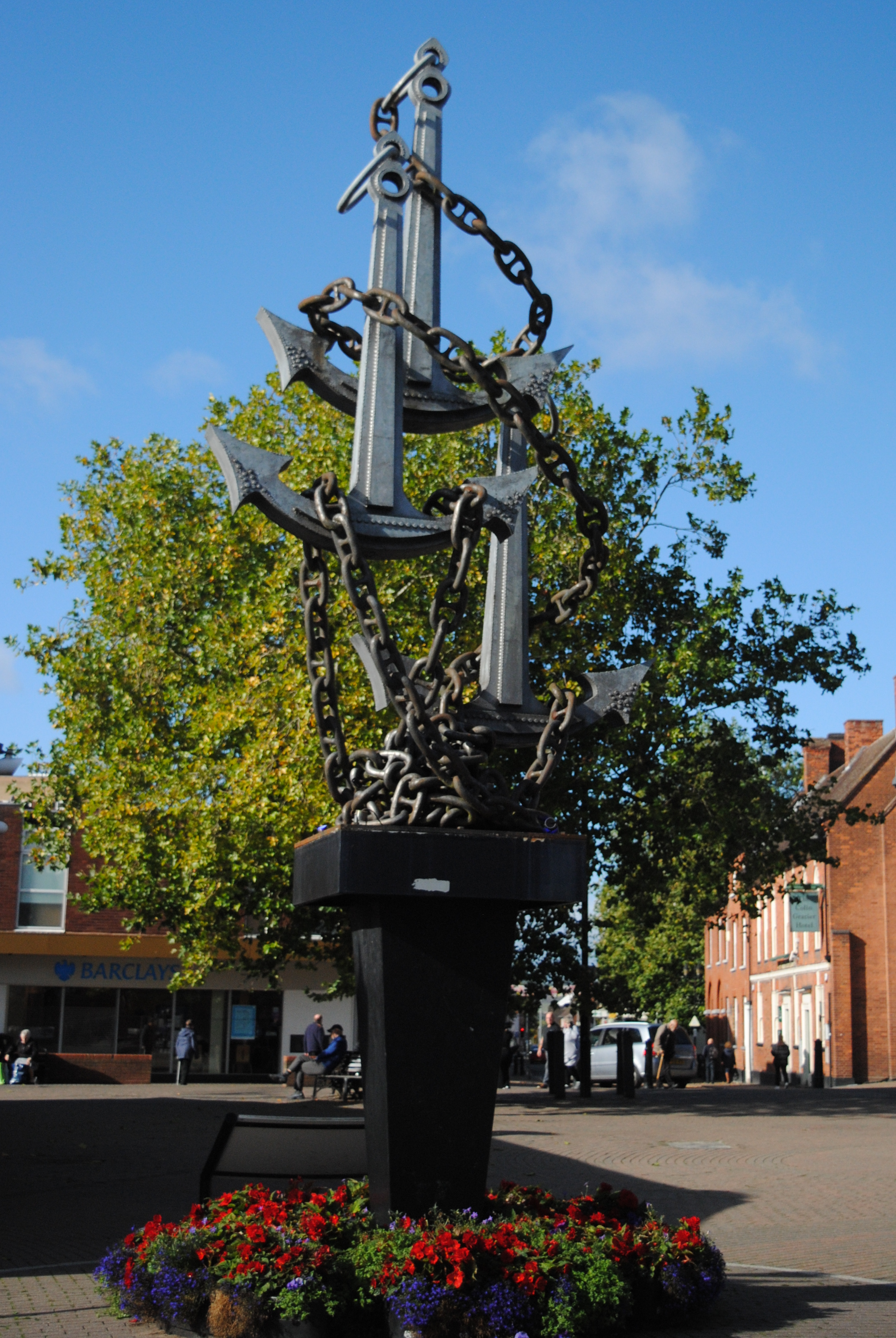
Memorial to Brown, Fasson and Grazier in Tamworth, Staffordshire

Fasson is commemorated with plaques at Bedrule Kirk and the Jedburgh British Legion Club, while his George Cross is held by the Scottish National War Museum at Edinburgh Castle.

Fasson, Brown and Grazier are each commemorated with an anchor on the (pictured) memorial statue in Grazier's hometown of Tamworth, Staffordshire. Created by the Polish scupltor Walenty Pytel, it was unveiled on the 60th anniversary of their capture of U-559's secret materials.

The museum at Bletchley Park has an audio visual exhibit dedicated to bravery of Fasson, Brown and Grazier.
