= German submarine U-559 =

German World War II submarine

History

Nazi Germany
- Name: U-559
- Ordered: 16 October 1939
- Builder: Blohm & Voss, Hamburg
- Yard number: 535
- Laid down: 1 February 1940
- Launched: 8 January 1941
- Commissioned: 27 February 1941
- Fate: Sunk by depth charges on 30 October 1942

General characteristics
- Class & type: Type VIIC submarine
- Displacement: 769 tonnes (757 long tons) surfaced; 871 t (857 long tons) submerged
- Length: 67.10 m (220 ft 2 in) o/a; 50.50 m (165 ft 8 in) pressure hull
- Beam: 6.20 m (20 ft 4 in) o/a; 4.70 m (15 ft 5 in) pressure hull
- Height: 9.60 m (31 ft 6 in)
- Draught: 4.74 m (15 ft 7 in)
- Installed power: 2,800–3,200 PS (2,100–2,400 kW; 2,800–3,200 bhp) (diesels); 750 PS (550 kW; 740 shp) (electric)
- Propulsion: 2 shafts; 2 × diesel engines; 2 × electric motors
- Speed: 17.7 knots (32.8 km/h; 20.4 mph) surfaced; 7.6 knots (14.1 km/h; 8.7 mph) submerged
- Range: 8,500 nmi (15,700 km; 9,800 mi) at 10 knots (19 km/h; 12 mph) surfaced; 80 nmi (150 km; 92 mi) at 4 knots (7.4 km/h; 4.6 mph) submerged
- Test depth: 230 m (750 ft); Crush depth: 250–295 m (820–968 ft)
- Complement: 4 officers, 40–56 enlisted
- Armament: 5 × 53.3 cm (21 in) torpedo tubes (four bow, one stern); 14 × torpedoes or 26 TMA mines; 1 × 8.8 cm (3.46 in) deck gun (220 rounds); 1 x 2 cm (0.79 in) C/30 AA gun

Service record
- Part of: 1st U-boat Flotilla; 27 February – 31 October 1941; 23rd U-boat Flotilla; 1 November 1941 – 14 April 1942; 29th U-boat Flotilla; 15 April – 30 October 1942
- Identification codes: M 38 782
- Commanders: Kptlt. Hans Heidtmann; 27 February 1941 – 30 October 1942
- Operations: 10 patrols: 1st patrol: 4 June – 5 July 1941; 2nd patrol: 26 July – 22 August 1941; 3rd patrol: 20 September – 20 October 1941; 4th patrol: 24 November – 4 December 1941; 5th patrol: 8 – 31 December 1941; 6th patrol: 16 – 26 February 1942; 7th patrol: a. 4 – 21 March 1942; b. 24 – 27 March 1942; c. 10 – 12 May 1942; 8th patrol: a. 18 May – 22 June 1942; b. 15 – 21 August 1942; 9th patrol: 29 August – 21 September 1942; 10th patrol: 29 September – 30 October 1942
- Victories: 4 merchant ships sunk (11,811 GRT); 1 warship sunk (1,060 tons); 2 merchant ships total loss (6,117 GRT)

German submarine U-559 was a Type VIIC U-boat built for Nazi Germany's Kriegsmarine for service during World War II.

Laid down on 1 February 1940 at the Blohm & Voss shipyards in Hamburg as "Baunummer 535" ("Yard number 535"), she was launched on 8 January 1941 and commissioned on 27 February under Kapitänleutnant Hans Heidtmann.

She began her service career with the 1st U-boat Flotilla, undergoing training before being declared operational on 1 June 1941. She moved to the 29th U-boat Flotilla on 15 April 1942. She sank five ships but is perhaps best remembered for an incident during her sinking in the Mediterranean Sea in 1942, in which British sailors seized cryptographic material from her. This material was extremely valuable in breaking the U-boat Enigma machine cipher.

== Design ==
German Type VIIC submarines were preceded by the shorter Type VIIB submarines. U-559 had a displacement of 769 tonnes (757 long tons) when at the surface and 871 tonnes (857 long tons) while submerged. She had a total length of 67.10 m (220 ft 2 in), a pressure hull length of 50.50 m (165 ft 8 in), a beam of 6.20 m (20 ft 4 in), a height of 9.60 m (31 ft 6 in), and a draught of 4.74 m (15 ft 7 in). The submarine was powered by two Germaniawerft F46 four-stroke, six-cylinder supercharged diesel engines producing a total of 2,800 to 3,200 metric horsepower (2,060 to 2,350 kW; 2,760 to 3,160 shp) for use while surfaced, two Brown, Boveri & Cie GG UB 720/8 double-acting electric motors producing a total of 750 metric horsepower (550 kW; 740 shp) for use while submerged. She had two shafts and two 1.23 m (4 ft) propellers. The boat was capable of operating at depths of up to 230 metres (750 ft).

The submarine had a maximum surface speed of 17.7 knots (32.8 km/h; 20.4 mph) and a maximum submerged speed of 7.6 knots (14.1 km/h; 8.7 mph). When submerged, the boat could operate for 80 nautical miles (150 km; 92 mi) at 4 knots (7.4 km/h; 4.6 mph); when surfaced, she could travel 8,500 nautical miles (15,700 km; 9,800 mi) at 10 knots (19 km/h; 12 mph). U-559 was fitted with five 53.3 cm (21 in) torpedo tubes (four fitted at the bow and one at the stern), fourteen torpedoes, one 8.8 cm (3.46 in) SK C/35 naval gun, 220 rounds, and a 2 cm (0.79 in) C/30 anti-aircraft gun. The boat had a complement of between forty-four and sixty.

== Service history ==
U-559 was originally intended to serve as an Atlantic U-boat during the Battle of the Atlantic against Allied convoys in the Western Approaches.

=== First and second patrols ===
Her first patrol took her from Kiel on 4 June 1941, across the North Sea and through the gap between Greenland and Iceland. She arrived at St. Nazaire in occupied France on 5 July.

Her second sortie met with success when she torpedoed and sank the Alva about 600 nautical miles (1,100 km; 690 mi) west of Ushant. She returned to her French base on 22 August 1941.

=== Third patrol ===
For her third patrol, beginning on 20 September, she was assigned to the 'Goeben' group, which were the first U-boats to enter the Mediterranean in World War II through the heavily defended Strait of Gibraltar. She reached Salamis in Greece, after having first investigated the Libyan/Egyptian border.

=== Fourth patrol ===
On her fourth patrol, she torpedoed and sank the Australian sloop HMAS Parramatta off the Libyan coast; although most survivors were picked up by other ships, three men managed to reach dry land where they were rescued by advancing British troops.

=== Fifth, sixth and seventh patrols ===
On her fifth patrol, which began on 8 December 1941, the boat sank Shuntien on the 23rd. Shuntien carried 850 – 1,100 German and Italian prisoners of war. Between 800 and 1,000 people were killed, including at least 700 PoWs.

Her sixth and seventh patrols were both from Salamis to the area of the Libyan coast. They were without success.

=== Eighth and ninth patrols ===
Having moved to Pula in Croatia in March 1942, she then sortied on 18 May, and sank the tanker Athene and damaged the oiler Brambleleaf in a convoy attack on 10 June.

Her ninth patrol, however, was without success.

=== Wolfpacks ===
U-559 took part in one wolfpack, Goeben (20 September – 5 October 1941).

== Fate ==
It was her own demise that made her most famous. At about 05:00 on 30 October 1942, U-559 was spotted by a Royal Air Force Sunderland, W from 201 Squadron in position 31°47′N 33°24′E, 70 miles north of the Nile Delta. The destroyer HMS Hero was alerted by radio and steamed to intercept her, while the destroyers HMS Petard, Pakenham, Dulverton and Hurworth sailed from Port Said, Egypt. At about 12:34 a Wellesley patrol aircraft, F from 47 Squadron, spotted the periscope of the submerged U-559 and attacked with depth charges.

The destroyer group hunted for the U-boat for 16 hours, constantly depth charging. After dark, U-559, with a cracked pressure hull, unable to maintain level trim and four of her crew dead from explosions and flooding, was forced to the surface. She was close to Petard, which immediately opened fire with her Oerlikon 20 mm cannon.

The German crew hurriedly scrambled overboard without destroying their codebooks or Enigma machine and, crucially, having failed to open all the sea-water vents to scuttle the U-boat properly. Three Royal Navy sailors, Lieutenant Anthony Fasson, Able Seaman Colin Grazier and NAAFI canteen assistant Tommy Brown, then boarded the abandoned submarine. There are differing reports as to how the three British men boarded the U-boat. Some accounts (such as that of Kahn) say that they "swam naked" to U-559, which was sinking, but slowly. Sebag-Montefiore states that they either leapt from Petard or, in Brown's case, from a whaler. They retrieved the U-boat's Enigma key setting sheets with all current settings for the U-boat Enigma network. Two German crew members, rescued from the sea, watched this material being loaded into Petard's whaler but were dissuaded from interfering by an armed guard. Grazier and Fasson were inside the U-boat, attempting to get out, when it foundered; both drowned.

== Aftermath ==
Grazier and Fasson were awarded the George Cross posthumously, Brown was awarded the George Medal. The Victoria Cross was considered but not awarded, for the ostensible reason that their bravery was not "in the face of the enemy". Another consideration may have been that a Victoria Cross would have drawn unwanted attention to the U-boat's capture from German intelligence. It was also discovered that Brown had lied about his age in order to enlist, and was only 16 years old, making him one of the youngest recipients of the George Medal. He was discharged and returned home to North Shields, only to die two years later attempting to rescue his younger sister from a house fire.

The code-book material they retrieved was immensely valuable to the code-breakers at Bletchley Park, who had been unable to read the 4-rotor U-boat Enigma for ten months since its introduction by the German Kriegsmarine at the beginning of 1942. This captured material allowed them to read the cyphers for several weeks, and to break U-boat Enigma thereafter right through to the end of the war.

The recovery was one of several such events (e.g., the earlier capture of U-110), that inspired the fictional account of the submarine capture in the 2000 film U-571.

== Summary of raiding history ==
Date	Ship Name	Nationality	Tonnage (Note: Merchant ship tonnages are in gross register tons. Military vessels are listed by tons displacement.)	Fate
19 August 1941	Alva	United Kingdom	1,584	Sunk
27 November 1941	HMAS Parramatta	Royal Australian Navy	1,060	Sunk
23 December 1941	Shuntien	United Kingdom	3,059	Sunk
26 December 1941	Warszawa	Poland	2,487	Sunk
10 June 1942	Athene	Norway	4,681	Sunk
10 June 1942	Brambleleaf	United Kingdom	5,917	Total loss
12 October 1942	Bringhi	Egypt	200	Total loss

== See also ==
- Mediterranean U-boat Campaign (World War II)
- German submarine U-505
- German submarine U-110

== Bibliography ==
- Busch, Rainer; Röll, Hans-Joachim (1999). German U-boat commanders of World War II: a biographical dictionary. Translated by Brooks, Geoffrey. London, Annapolis, Md: Greenhill Books, Naval Institute Press. ISBN 1-55750-186-6.
- Busch, Rainer; Röll, Hans-Joachim (1999). Deutsche U-Boot-Verluste von September 1939 bis Mai 1945 [German U-boat losses from September 1939 to May 1945]. Der U-Boot-Krieg (in German). Vol. IV. Hamburg, Berlin, Bonn: Mittler. ISBN 3-8132-0514-2.
- Stephen Harper (1999). Capturing Enigma: How HMS Petard Seized the German Naval Codes. Sutton. ISBN 978-0-7509-2316-3.
- Gröner, Erich; Jung, Dieter; Maass, Martin (1991). German Warships 1815–1945, U-boats and Mine Warfare Vessels. Vol. 2. Translated by Thomas, Keith; Magowan, Rachel. London: Conway Maritime Press. ISBN 0-85177-593-4.
- Kahn, David; Seizing the Enigma: The Race to Break the German U-Boats Codes, 1939-1943, (1991)
- Kemp, Paul (1999). U-Boats Destroyed - German Submarine Losses in the World Wars. London: Arms & Armour. ISBN 1-85409-515-3.
- Sharpe, Peter (1998). U-Boat Fact File. Great Britain: Midland Publishing. ISBN 1-85780-072-9.
- Shores, Christopher; Massimello, Giovanni; Guest, Russell; Olynyk, Frank; Bock, Winfried (2012). A History of the Mediterranean Air War 1940–1945: Volume Two: North African Desert February 1952 – March 1943. London: Grub Street. ISBN 978-1-909166-12-7.
