= HMS Petard (G56) =

P-class destroyer converted to Type 16 frigate of the Royal Navy

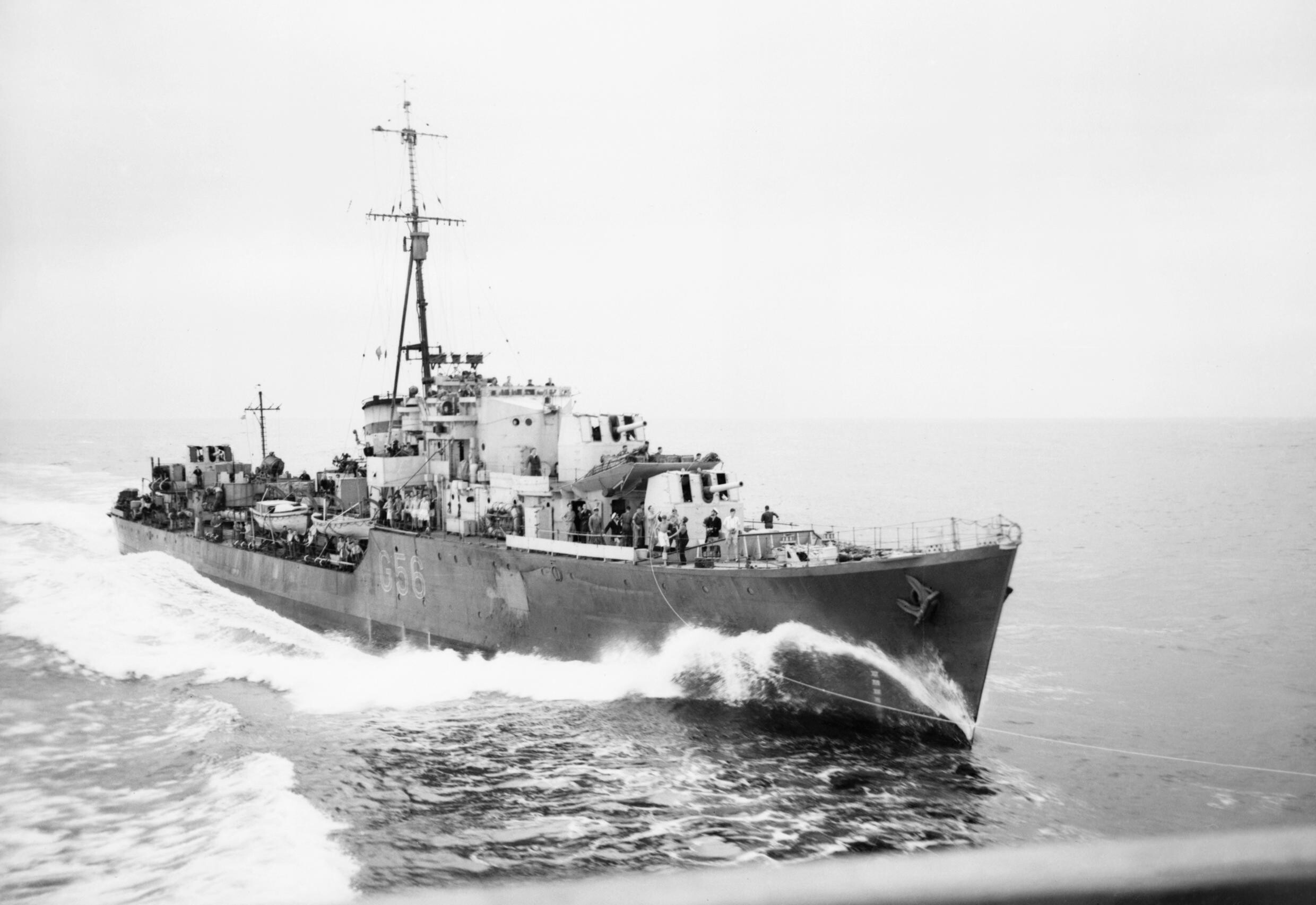
- Petard photographed from the aircraft carrier HMS Formidable, December 1943

History

United Kingdom
- Name: HMS Petard
- Builder: Vickers-Armstrongs, High Walker
- Laid down: 26 December 1939
- Launched: 27 March 1941
- Completed: 15 June 1942
- Identification: Pennant number G56/F56
- Fate: Broken up in June 1967 at Bo'ness

General characteristics as P–class
- Class & type: P-class destroyer
- Displacement: 1,690 tons (1,717 tonnes) standard; 1,640 tons (1,666 tonnes); 2,250 tons (2,286 tonnes) full load
- Length: 345 ft (105 m) o/a
- Beam: 35 ft (11 m)
- Draught: 9 ft (2.7 m)
- Propulsion: 2 × Admiralty 3-drum water-tube boilers, Parsons geared steam turbines, 40,000 shp on 2 shafts
- Speed: 36.75 knots (68.06 km/h)
- Range: 3,850 nautical miles (7,130 km) at 20 knots (37 km/h)
- Complement: 176
- Armament: 5 × QF 4 in Mk.V (102 mm L/45), single mounts HA Mk.III; 4 × QF 2 pdr Mk.VIII (40 mm L/39), quad mount Mk.VII; Up to 6 × QF 20 mm Oerlikon, single mount P Mk.III; 4 (1×4) tubes for 21-inch (533 mm) torpedoes, Mk.IX; 4 × throwers and 2 × racks for 70 depth charges

General characteristics as Type 16 class
- Class & type: Type 16 frigate
- Displacement: 1,800 long tons (1,800 t) standard; 2,300 long tons (2,300 t) full load
- Length: 362 ft 9 in (110.57 m) o/a
- Beam: 37 ft 9 in (11.51 m)
- Draught: 14 ft 6 in (4.42 m)
- Propulsion: 2 × Admiralty 3-drum boilers; Steam turbines, 40,000 shp; 2 shafts
- Speed: 32 knots (37 mph; 59 km/h) full load
- Complement: 175
- Sensors & processing systems: Type 293Q target indication Radar; Type 974 navigation Radar; Type 1010 Cossor Mark 10 IFF; Type 146B search Sonar; Type 147 depth finder Sonar; Type 162 target classification Sonar; Type 174 attack Sonar
- Armament: 1 × twin QF 4-inch (102 mm) gun Mk XVI; 1 × twin 40 mm Bofors gun Mk.5; 5 × single 40 mm Bofors gun Mk.9; 2 × Squid A/S mortar; 1 × quad 21-inch (533 mm) tubes for Mk.9 torpedoes

HMS Petard was a P-class destroyer of the British Royal Navy that saw service during the Second World War. She was one of only three P-class ships, out of the original eight, to survive the war in a serviceable condition.

Originally to have been named HMS Persistent, Petard was launched in March 1941. She initially carried the pennant number G56, which was changed after the war to F56.

Petard had the distinction of sinking a submarine from each of the three Axis navies: the German U-559, the Italian Uarsciek and the Japanese I-27.

Members of the ship's crew recovered from U-559 a new, four-wheel Enigma cypher machine and the books to go with it, albeit at the cost of the lives of her First Lieutenant and an Able Seaman, both of whom were drowned when the U-boat they were searching sank with them inside.

== The early years ==
Petard was launched on 27 March 1941 at Walker's shipyard in Newcastle, on the River Tyne. Accommodation was basic, the officers had a cabin each in the aft of the ship, which doubled as office space. The ratings were housed in messes forward and slept in hammocks. As a result of these locations, confusion could arise when 'action stations' were sounded which might involve the officers making their way forward towards the bridge while gun-crews attempted to move aft to the stern armament.

She was fitted out and handed over to "a mainly untried crew" on 15 July 1942. Although the ship was fitted with radar, it was relatively primitive, so the need for a good visual watch was regarded as crucial. Her first captain was Lieutenant Commander Stephen Beattie who would go on to win the Victoria Cross in the St Nazaire Raid. He was replaced by Lt Cmdr Mark Thornton DSC on 28 April, (he had come from the destroyer Harvester; his DSC was for sinking a German U-boat). He worked the ship's company hard in training.

=== Convoy WS 21 ===
Petard began operations in late July as part of the naval escort of the Middle East-bound Convoy WS 21, (via the Cape of Good Hope). It was an inauspicious baptism; two Sunderland flying boats were shot down by the convoy's gunners and Ledbury, another escort, collided with a ship from the inbound Convoy MG 86, in fog.

The convoy steamed south, into improving weather. Thornton seemed to live up to his reputation for eccentricity, standing for long periods on the upper yard, tied to the mast, ensuring the crews' state of alert was maintained by pelting those below him that he thought needed stimulation with objects brought from his pockets. Some officers took to wearing their steel helmets.

Stopping off for fuel in Simon's Town, South Africa, Petard's crew were granted some free time. This proved to be too much for three gun-layers, who missed the ship's sailing. Training continued, at one point soap was spread on the upper deck to make keeping one's footing difficult, thunder flashes were also used and the ship given an artificial list, to simulate realistic battle conditions. During this period, Petard suffered her first fatality when the wardroom chef collapsed and died. He was buried at sea. The rest of the voyage, via the eastern passage off Madagascar and through the Red Sea, culminated with the negotiation of the Suez Canal and passed without incident.

== The Mediterranean, part one ==
Having seen the convoy deliver its cargo, Petard joined the 12th Destroyer Flotilla in Port Said on 22 September. Two days later she used her guns in anger for the first time against three Junkers Ju 88 aircraft. The result was inconclusive.

Back in her mooring, the ship's first lieutenant had the opportunity to 'paint ship'; it was carried out under the watchful eye of the buffer (chief bosun's mate). Off-duty time was precious and sometimes amusing for the ship's crew. At one shore-side establishment, four of Petard's officers had just entered as an improvised 'rodeo' of gharry horses (normally employed pulling a cab), was coming to an end. They were then involved with a fish-pond, a Lebanese singer and a move to an out-of-bounds area which saw the Royal Marines Patrol concerned with their welfare.

For the next few days, Petard and the Vasilissa Olga (Queen Olga) took part in anti-submarine patrols and exercised with Allied submarines, improving the two ships' anti-submarine warfare training. On 12 October Petard and Onslow moved to Haifa to escort the cruiser Arethusa to Alexandria. The voyage included drills and tactics for the protection of convoys. Also in attendance were the cruisers Cleopatra, Orion and Euryalus and their attendant fleet destroyers. On 24 October she took part in the abortive interception of a German force said to be heading for Cyprus.

=== The U-559 action ===
On 30 October 1942, a Sunderland flying boat reported the sighting of a submarine north of the Nile Delta. Petard, with Pakenham, Dulverton, Hurworth and Hero, was involved in the sinking of U-559. After many hours of searching and attacks with depth charges, the U-boat was forced to the surface. Petard and Hurworth engaged the U-boat with their "pom-poms" and Oerlikons after the main armament (4-inch guns) was found to be ineffective. With illumination from the searchlights of Petard and Hurworth, the First Lieutenant, Anthony Fasson and Able Seaman Colin Grazier swam across to the U-boat. They went below and recovered a new, four-rotor Enigma machine, code-books and other important documents for transfer to Petard. They were helped by a 16-year-old NAAFI canteen assistant, Tommy Brown, who was originally thought to have swum across to the sinking submarine as well but when asked at the subsequent inquiry how he had boarded the U-boat, he testified that he "got on board just forward of the whaler on the port side when the deck was level with the conning tower". That whaler, under the command of Sub-Lieutenant Connell, went alongside the U-boat in the darkness.

Brown said that the conditions below were,

The lights were out — the First Lieutenant had a torch. The water was not very high but rising gradually all the time. When I came up the last time it was about two feet deep. There was a hole just forward of the conning tower through which water was pouring. As I went down through the conning tower compartment I felt it pouring down my back. Water was also coming in where plates were stove-in on either side of the conning tower... I saw Grazier and then the First Lieutenant also appeared at the bottom of the hatch. I shouted 'you had better come up' twice, and they had just started when the submarine started to sink very quickly. I managed to jump off and was picked up by the whaler.

The Enigma machine sank with the U-boat. Petard left the area for Haifa, signalling that documents had been captured. The code books they retrieved were immensely valuable to the Ultra code-breakers at Bletchley Park in England; just six weeks after the action, many U-boat signals were being read. An Admiralty report on the sinking stated "The battle was largely won by persistence". The German engineer officer said that prior to abandoning ship he had opened the sea-cocks on the U-boat. Thornton, honouring a promise he had made to the shipyard, sent them a German U-boat seaman's life jacket as a trophy. Later awarded the George Medal for the U-boat action, Brown died in 1945 attempting to rescue his infant sister from a fire in the family home in North Shields. Fasson and Grazier were awarded a posthumous George Cross each. The 2000 film U-571 drew on this and similar actions (U-110) by the Royal Navy for its plot.

== The Mediterranean, part two ==
=== Convoy escort ===
Petard, with sister ship Paladin, was ordered on 9 November to enter Alexandria harbour and trained her torpedo tubes on ships of the Vichy French fleet while political negotiations were conducted for their transfer to Allied command. Almost immediately after the successful conclusion to this situation she sailed, with Queen Olga, as escort to two supply ships. The convoy was preceded by three minesweepers; their destination was Mersa Matruh, which had supposedly been re-captured from Axis forces. As dawn broke on 12 November, a Ju 88 was sighted, apparently on a reconnaissance mission. There was some doubt about the situation in Mersa Matruh; as a signal to that effect was being received, RDF (radar) reported a number of aircraft closing the convoy. Ten Ju 88s began their bomb run. Petard was the only ship in the convoy with armament that could put up a creditable defence (although Queen Olga had larger calibre guns than Petard, they could not be elevated sufficiently for anti-aircraft use). After an initial flurry of bombs, which scored no hits, the German aircraft broke off to attack individually, at which point they were close enough for every gun in the convoy to engage them. The naval action was curtailed when four Spitfires attacked the bombers; the convoy had suffered only minor damage but was nonetheless ordered to return to Port Said, which, for the merchantmen only, was amended to Alexandria.

=== Convoy MW 13 and Operation Stoneage ===
Operation Stoneage was part of the effort to supply Malta. Four merchantmen were to be escorted, initially by a total of nine warships, including Petard. The escort was reinforced with the addition of three cruisers and 14 more destroyers, which set course for Malta on 17 November. Only one incident of note involved Petard. An alert look-out sighted a dinghy which contained five RAF men who had been shot down the previous day. The navigator surprised his rescuers after being picked up by running up to the bridge chart house to confirm his estimate of their position, thus winning a bet with his fellow survivors.

The first air raid, carried out by the Italian Regia Aeronautica (air force), commenced from high altitude in mid-afternoon. No serious damage was inflicted. It was followed by small groups of Italian and German aircraft, which did not press their attack home with conviction. It was only as dusk fell that the convoy faced a more determined onslaught, when six Ju 88 torpedo-bombers, approached the convoy from different directions. Those ships with sufficient 'sea-room' took evasive action. Some ships in the outer escort screen suffered damage from falling shell splinters from the close escort, a constant hazard.

The following morning more attacks were carried out by the Axis, but accurate bombing was discouraged by advantageous cloud cover, the escorts' barrage and the presence of Bristol Beaufighters over the convoy. One attack, less desultory than most, was launched by six Ju 88s on the starboard screen, Petard was the last ship in the line. Only a few near misses and violent manoeuvres by the escorts were the result.

In the evening of 18 November, a force of 26 Ju 88 torpedo bombers in three groups attacked the convoy, silhouetted against the light from a pattern of air-dropped flares. The escorts' guns were firing in all directions, trying to distract the German aircraft. In the confusion the cruiser Arethusa was hit by a torpedo.

==== Towing Arethusa ====
Petard and the destroyer Javelin were detached to offer assistance. Thornton, as senior officer, almost immediately sent Javelin back to the convoy, reasoning that Malta's survival had priority over Arethusa's and that the convoy needed every ship. Petard then carried out Asdic (later called active sonar) sweeps to discourage submarines and prepared to take the crippled ship in tow. With everything ready, the tow began, rising to a speed of 10 kn (19 km/h; 12 mph) in the first hour. Arethusa had adopted a 15-degree list which was reduced to five degrees over six hours by jettisoning upper-deck fittings and transferring liquids; this also improved the cruiser's steering. Exchanges of signals to increase speed (to get inside air cover before dawn), were interrupted when the tow-line parted. It was reconnected and the tow resumed at 5 kn (9.3 km/h; 5.8 mph). At dawn on 19 November the two ships were being shadowed by a German reconnaissance aircraft, which was chased away by a pair of Beaufighters but reported the tow's position. Two high-level attacks were then mounted but driven off by a combination of the ships' guns and the Beaufighters.

The worsening weather was causing serious strain on the cruiser's hull and it was decided to continue the tow with Arethusa stern-first. The tow was slipped and re-connected with some difficulty; by this time Thornton had been on the bridge for three days. The bridge staff were also exhausted; off-duty seamen were pressed into moving the heavy towing hawsers into position. Once everything was in place, the tow towards Alexandria continued at 3 kn (5.6 km/h; 3.5 mph). One determined attack came in the afternoon from four Ju 88s. Petard was straddled, the closest bomb landing just 15 yd (14 m) from the ship but to no effect. This turned out to be the last offensive action.

On the cruiser, casualty signals were sent; Arethusa had suffered 157 dead, and the captain was amongst the wounded. On Petard men got a little rest, sleeping where they could. News came through that Convoy MW 13 had reached Malta, the first for nearly two years. By noon on 19 November the storm looked like it would blow itself out. Two tugs, dispatched from Alexandria, took over the tow into the harbour which was completed on 20 November.

=== More convoy escort work ===
On 23 November Petard led Paladin with the two merchantmen originally destined for Mersa Matruh and an armed merchant cruiser loaded with reinforcements to Tobruk. Entry to the shattered port was made difficult by sunken ships and other underwater obstacles. Thornton went ashore for a guided tour by the garrison commander. On their return to Port Said, the two "P"s were separated; Paladin entered the harbour while Petard shepherded a motley collection of vessels along the coast to Alexandria. Petard was ordered to return her charges to Port Said due to recent German mine-laying; a minesweeper was lost.

Another Malta convoy, Operation Portcullis, Convoy MW 14, commenced just fifteen days after its predecessor. Four merchant ships, including a tanker, were to be escorted to Malta by warships similar in numbers and strength to Convoy MW 13. On the second day out, a remarkable coincidence occurred when the crew of a Wellington bomber were picked up by Petard in the same area as the first recovery. They, too, had spent about 24 hours adrift. The empty ships, as Convoy ME 11, returned to Port Said. It was during this journey that Petard shot down her first enemy aircraft, on 7 December 1942.

Petard and Queen Olga went to the assistance of a small convoy which was under constant air attack. The destroyers had been diverted from a run to Malta with a cargo of important spare parts. Reaching Tobruk, they spent a relatively peaceful night in the wreck-strewn anchorage, before going on to Benghazi on 13 December. An air raid was under way as the two ships entered the harbour. A tanker was hit and soon burning but the inferno did not deter a party of Royal Army Service Corps (RASC) soldiers who unloaded their stores with studied nonchalance.

=== The Uarsciek action ===
While on her way to Malta with Queen Olga from Benghazi on 15 December 1942, Petard (still under the command of Lt Cmdr Thornton), engaged and sank the Italian Adua-class submarine Uarsciek. At first it was thought that it might be the British submarine P-35, but in the darkness the Italian vessel fired two torpedoes which Petard 'combed' by turning between the torpedo tracks. She then replied with two depth charge patterns followed by one from Queen Olga which forced the damaged submarine to the surface 200 yd (180 m) from Petard. She was illuminated by both ship's searchlights. Men seen on the casing were then engaged by Petard's guns. There are some discrepancies in the recollections of crew members about the gun action but what is known is that Petard "half-rammed" the submarine which sank some time later. The two destroyers were rapturously received on their arrival in Malta. Petard subsequently spent time in dry dock in Alexandria for repairs to her bows following the collision. Two DSOs, one DSC, two DSMs and several Mention in Despatches (MiD) were awarded for the action. King George II of Greece, as well as decorating his own men, also awarded the War Cross, Third Class, to Thornton.

== The Mediterranean, part three ==
=== New captain ===
Thornton's last operation with the ship was commanding the escort of a slow convoy to Alexandria, leaving Haifa on 31 December 1942. Petard went into dry dock once more when it was discovered that the previous visit was unsatisfactory. Thornton left the ship without ceremony on 9 January 1943 at his own request. The strain of command had taken its toll. One of his last actions was to send the ceremonial colours from Uarsciek to Walkers Yard in Newcastle. It was to be the last such gift. His replacement was Lieutenant Commander Rupert Egan RN, who joined from his previous command, the destroyer Croome.

=== 1943 ===
As a result of successful trials following the repairs, Petard, with Pakenham and Queen Olga were ordered south, through the Suez Canal and into the Red Sea. They were to rendezvous off Perim island with convoy 'Phomplett'. This group of large, but empty, ships was bound for Colombo, Ceylon. With other Mediterranean-based vessels, the three ships escorted the 'troopers' to a mid-ocean meeting point where craft from the Eastern Fleet took over on 8 February. The 12th Flotilla ships then turned about. On the return journey they passed the crippled cruiser Arethusa which was making her way to the US for permanent repairs.

In support of the Eighth Army's advance westward, Petard became part of the escort for a 24-ship convoy to Tripoli; departing Alexandria on 17 February. Arriving without incident on 21 February, the harbour entrance was found to be partially blocked, compelling the ships to discharge their human cargoes into lighters and landing craft. That evening, Petard sailed to Tobruk with a troop carrier, and for six days ran a shuttle service to the new front, west of Tripoli. Food captured from the Italians was issued to the ships, but in many instances the labels had come off the tins; discovering the identity of the contents was a bit hit and miss. Fruit was at a premium, so when some of the crew came across a party of soldiers who had a cache of peaches but no cigarettes, it did not take long for a deal to be struck.

==== Club runs ====
The 12th Destroyer Flotilla was to be based in Malta, a reflection of the war situation. Petard, along with many other ships, was to participate in Operation Retribution, the Allied effort to prevent German and Italian forces from reinforcing their garrisons in Tunisia. Naval forces were to also prevent evacuation or escape. One of the first Retribution offensive sweeps was carried out by Pakenham, Queen Olga and Petard on 16 March..

Petard and her consorts were still involved in convoy escort work. On one occasion, their convoy was attacked by six Junkers Ju 87 (Stuka) dive bombers escorted by Messerschmitt Bf 109 fighters. As the Stukas came out of the sun in a near vertical dive, the 4-inch high-angle guns put out a barrage, firing up to 22 rounds a minute. Egan established his style of ship-handling, lying back in his bridge chair and wearing smoked glasses (against the sun's rays), while calling out helm and speed alterations. Three dive bombers were shot down; one, which narrowly missed Queen Olga, by the accompanying Beaufighters. Ex-Leading Seaman Douglas Vowles cited Egan's commitment and skill as "saving my life and that of my shipmates many times over".

Petard, accompanied by Paladin, took part in a high-speed dash to bombard the port of Sousse in Tunisia in early April 1943. Using charts captured from Uarsciek, the two ships negotiated minefields and avoided German U-boats before reaching their objective. As they withdrew, they were intercepted by several E-boats. Both destroyers were raked by German machine gun fire, but there were no casualties, and only minor damage was sustained. Petard was not so lucky on 24 April when she was strafed by an unknown aircraft (or several aircraft, sources vary). Four men were killed and buried at sea, a fifth died later in Malta; ten were wounded.

As the North Africa campaign neared its conclusion, Petard, with Paladin and the destroyer Nubian in the Battle of the Campobasso Convoy attacked and sank the Italian merchantman Compobasso and the destroyer Perseo off Cape Bon, the latter ship exploding within sight of the last Axis stronghold on 4 May. A hospital ship was intercepted and taken to the area of the sinkings to pick up survivors.

A bizarre situation was encountered when Petard came upon a launch towing a dinghy 30 mi (48 km) from Kelibia on 9 May. The two vessels contained 14 men – two RAF aircrew, 10 Germans and two Italians. The RAF men had been shot down, and the Germans and Italians were trying to escape to Sicily. The Germans had ordered the airmen into the launch and were trying to force the Italians into the dinghy. Inexplicably, the Italians were still armed when Petard was sighted. On her arrival off Sousse, the airmen and the prisoners were transferred to another ship. As a recognition aid in the waters between Tunisia and Sicily, it was decided that all Allied vessels were to have their bridge structures painted red. By dawn on 11 May, ships were only covered slightly better than their crews.

==== The Sicilian campaign ====
The Allies then turned their attention to Sicily, On the same day of the Axis surrender in North Africa (12 May), Petard joined Nubian and the destroyer Isis as escorts to the cruiser Orion within sight of 11 in (279 mm) coastal guns on Pantellaria island; they fired two salvos which straddled Petard. A third salvo landed close enough to cause sufficient damage to ensure that the pumps had to be used all the way back to Malta.

On 16 May Petard picked up four Germans who had been floating on a raft made out of buoyancy containers. They were in such a deathlike state that sea-birds had begun to peck at them. The following day a German hospital ship was intercepted. The search party sent to investigate discovered unwounded men in civilian clothes. The vessel was therefore sent to Malta for the interrogation of its passengers; while underway, a company of infantrymen and a number of support troops emerged from their hiding places. Automatic weapons, ammunition and explosives were subsequently found.

During a patrol between Cape Bon and Mattimo, Petard and Paladin came across a Walrus amphibious aircraft that had been forced down by engine trouble. Petard towed the disabled flying boat to the former French base at Bizerta on 10 June.

Hopes of home leave were raised and dashed when Petard passed Gibraltar and sailed out into the Atlantic only to join up with the incoming Sicily invasion force. She was patrolling on 10 July, the first day of the landings, but returned to Malta to embark Allied Supreme Commander General Dwight Eisenhower and his staff on 14 July and take them to the British beaches at Pachino and the Gulf of Noto. Having attended two conferences, Eisenhower re-embarked and was soon on his way back to Malta.

While shelling a road near Catania with three other ships next day, Petard was hit by a round fired from a tank; the shell passed through the ship but caused little damage. She took part in other bombardments; on one she narrowly avoided an aerial torpedo but was damaged on 30 July when going alongside the battleship Warspite at speed. She returned to Malta for repairs.

==== Italy ====
By the middle of August the occupation of Sicily was complete; the Eighth Army could concentrate on the Italian mainland. Over the next month Petard was employed mostly on escort work, including being part of the screening force of 23 destroyers for the aircraft carriers Illustrious and Formidable and the battleships Nelson, Rodney, Warspite and Valiant. By 15 September the beaches at Salerno were in crisis. The American admiral in command of the invasion armada called for extra naval gun-fire support. Warspite and Valiant responded. Petard landed Warspite's Forward Observation Officer, (FOO), using her cutter, then stayed close in-shore to use her own guns to help to retrieve the situation.

That evening, while defending against a German bombing and torpedo attack, Petard came off worse in another encounter with Warspite. A six-inch shell, thought to have come from the battleship, exploded in the forward seaman's mess deck; two men were killed, six others were wounded. In early October Petard was based in Brindisi, from where she crossed the Adriatic, searching coves and inlets between Iasun island and Dubrovnik for German shipping. It was after leaving the area for Malta and refuelling before moving to the Dodecanese islands, that the crew learned of the loss of Queen Olga.

==== The Aegean ====
Petard's Aegean campaign, in what became known as the "destroyers' graveyard", began on 7 October 1943, the day that the island of Cos or Kos, fell to the Germans. She, with Panther was escorting the anti-aircraft cruiser Carlisle and searching at night, with two Hunt-class destroyers, for a German force reportedly heading for the island of Leros. They withdrew at dawn, the two Hunts being relieved by Rockwood (also Hunt-class) and the Miaoulis. The five-ship flotilla was attacked by sixteen Ju 87 dive bombers. Panther was sunk and Carlisle, hit four times, was damaged beyond repair. Air cover was reduced when American North Africa-based Lockheed P-38 Lightnings were transferred to the Central Mediterranean theatre. Petard made two trips to Leros at night with troops, vehicles and stores, hiding in neutral Turkish waters during the day. A third attempt had to be abandoned while Petard was in Leros harbour due to the severity of the bombing.

These reinforcement runs continued, with varying degrees of success. Air attacks were not the only worry, another threat was from mines. On 22/23 October Petard and another destroyer, Eclipse, acting after the loss of the Hunt class Hurworth and the Adrias (which lost a third of her forward section before being beached), entered a minefield east (rather than west) of Kalymnos Island. Eclipse was sunk with great loss of life, but Petard, picking up survivors, managed to withdraw to safety.

The tempo did not let up. On 24/25 October, after landing a naval base party at Leros, Petard moved to a Turkish bay to lay up for the day. She continued to be scrutinised by the Turks and buzzed by German aircraft. On another occasion, Turkish officials boarded the ship demanding to know when Petard might sail. It was only when shown a stripped-down (but perfectly serviceable) engine and being told that it was essential it was repaired that they relented. Wardroom hospitality also helped.

For Petard's fifth Aegean sortie, Egan, as senior officer, was in charge of a three-destroyer flotilla loaded with men and stores that met up with the cruiser Aurora on 30 October; her extra anti-aircraft firepower was soon needed. Having thwarted a high-altitude attack, with help from accompanying Beaufighters, a further raid by 14 Ju 87s hit Aurora amidships, killing 46 and wounding 20. Aurora withdrew, escorted by the destroyer Beaufort. That left Petard and Belvoir to complete their mission to Leros. Still harassed by bombing, the two ships continued; Belvoir had a lucky escape when she was hit by a bomb that failed to explode and later was found deep in the ship, carried up on deck and unceremoniously dumped over the stern.

Petard's next foray was with the Hunt-class destroyers Rockwood and the Polish ORP Krakowiak. On 9 November her RDF picked up a vessel in the vicinity of Kalymnos Island which turned out to be a landing craft accompanied by two caïques packed with soldiers. The three ships opened fire with their main armament. Krakowiak then fired a star-shell over Kalymnos harbour, its light revealed a merchant ship, which was set on fire by the destroyers; Egan took Petard into the mouth of the harbour to confirm the destruction of the merchant ship and fire a torpedo at the harbour entrance. Aircraft on Cos were engaged by her four-inch guns. During the withdrawal Rockwood was hit by a glider bomb which failed to explode but started a fire; the damage was such that Petard was asked for a tow. With sporadic attacks still coming from the air, tow preparations were very quickly carried out. Temporary shelter was gained in a landlocked bay in Turkey. While there it was discovered that the bomb had torn through thawing beef, creating a gory scene which the damage-control party initially mistook for a massacre: Rockwood was eventually towed to Alexandria.

Petard's last Aegean task on 19 November 1943 was to assist in the evacuation of British forces from Leros; but no escaping personnel were found. She was then ordered to Haifa for a boiler clean and leave over Christmas. This was to be followed by going east to engage the Japanese.

== The Far East, part one ==
In January 1944 a fleet assembled in Alexandria and passed through the Suez Canal for deployment to the East Indies and the Pacific; Petard was in her usual escort role. Following extensive exercises and drills, there was a welcome break when the aircraft carrier Unicorn and the battlecruiser Renown were diverted to Cochin in south west India on 24 January; Petard was part of their escort. Her arrival in Trincomalee, Ceylon on 28 January was marked by the contrast between the immaculate fleet and the patches and rust stains on Petard and Paladin. The two "P"s were banished to a nearby creek to 'paint ship'. Petard had other worries; her main armament fired, among other types, semi-armour piercing (SAP) ammunition, but there was none to be had in Alexandria or Trincomalee; this shortage was to be noticeable before too long.

The two destroyers joined Convoy KR 8 in the Indian Ocean on the last part of its journey to Colombo. While underway to meet it, they encountered a huge herd of whales which seemed to be fearless; there was danger of collision as the ships tried to maintain their anti-submarine zig-zag. On 10 February the two destroyers left a refuelling point at Addu Atoll and sailed west along the equator to rendezvous with the convoy. On 12 February Petard, now under the newly promoted Commander Rupert Egan, was involved in the destruction of the Japanese B1 type submarine I-27 after it had sunk the troop ship Khedive Ismail with the loss of 1,297 lives.

=== The I-27 action ===
On a clear day and a calm sea, torpedo tracks were easily sighted heading for the troop ships. Khedive Ismail was hit and sank in minutes. Petard responded with a number of depth charge attacks, one of which, like the submarine, was close to the main group of survivors; these attacks were initially unsuccessful. After her third pattern, a larger than normal submarine (which turned out to be almost as long and have a greater displacement than Petard), was forced to the surface. Petard and Paladin (which had been picking up survivors), engaged the submarine with their four-inch main armament. Petard stopped firing when Paladin adopted a course to ram the Japanese vessel. Petard, whose captain was the senior officer, frantically signalled her sister-ship to abort the ramming, fearing fatal damage to her consort. Paladin complied and turned away from her intended 'victim', but her momentum took her broadside into the submarine's hydroplane, opening a gash 15 ft (4.6 m) long in Paladin's hull.

With Paladin out of action, it fell to Petard to continue the attack, which she did with several close-range depth charge attacks; all to no avail, they could not be set shallow enough to cause any damage, but they did divert the Japanese submarine's attention from the helpless Paladin. Petard pulled away to engage the submarine with her four-inch guns once more, but this was also ineffective: hits were registered, but they were with impact-fuzed shells due to the lack of SAP ammunition. Petard then tried a torpedo attack, but it took seven attempts before there was any sign of success. Two and a half hours had passed since the submarine was forced to the surface.

Douglas Vowles, a Leading Seaman operating "B" gun, sighted I-27's log book floating in the water near the stricken submarine amidst a school of sharks that was corralling the Japanese survivors. Vowles recovered the logbook that contained much valuable information on Japanese activity in the Pacific. He was mentioned in despatches. Petard then went to assist Paladin, transferring all survivors and towing the disabled destroyer 100–150 nmi (190–280 km; 120–170 mi) (sources vary), to Addu Atoll.

== Home and more repairs ==
More escort duties followed, but they were uneventful. With Paladin homeward bound for repairs, Petard sailed to Bombay, where she enjoyed a nine-day break before leading the River-class frigates Plym and Helford, the Dutch ship Derg and Convoy BA 66A to Aden. Her next job involved meeting the Richelieu in the Red Sea and escorting her (but only as far as Aden). On her return to Trincomalee in April, Petard was soon employed on sallies with capital ships in various groups. This training preceded Operation Cockpit, a diversionary attack to reduce pressure on American fleets further east. Petard joined Force 69, and took part in the bombardment of Japanese installations.

In late July Petard escorted a convoy from the Seychelles to Aden. She was then instructed to sail alone for Britain; most of the crew had not been home for over two years. Just after passing through a strangely quiet Suez Canal, Petard sighted and recovered the crew, complete with hand baggage, of the American Liberty ship Samslarnia in the eastern Mediterranean. The freighter had been torpedoed but had not sunk. Part of her cargo was silver bullion. After an overnight stop in Plymouth, Petard arrived in Portsmouth on 16 August 1944 bearing a total of 49 patches on her hull.

Following repairs and refit in dry dock, Petard set out for the naval base at Scapa Flow with a new crew in early 1945. En route she had 13 Asdic contacts with German U-boats in the Irish Sea, firing patterns of depth charges without result. Leaving the 'Flow', she was in transit to meet a Russian convoy, but diverted into dry-dock at North Shields to rectify damage to her propeller which had apparently been caused by her own depth charges. While she was there the war in Europe ended, but Petard had not finished yet. She was heading for the Far East once more. On her way out of the Clyde she passed surrendered U-boats.

== The Far East, part two ==
Petard went into dry dock once more in Alexandria before passing through the Suez Canal, arriving in Trincomalee back at full war readiness. In Operation Zipper, the planned re-occupation of Malaya, Petard was to be point ship. The Japanese surrender, following the atomic bombings of Hiroshima and Nagasaki, meant that such operations would not be necessary. Despite their capitulation, it was not clear that all the Japanese forces would obey the surrender order, or indeed, knew about it. Ships like Petard maintained a high state of readiness. That caution seemed to be justified when, a week after Victory over Japan Day, the second 'yellow' air raid warning of the day was shown to be for a solitary Japanese reconnaissance machine, which flew off when approached by nearby carrier-borne aircraft.

Petard was kept busy with the aftermath of war; she led the cruiser Cleopatra and the Royal Indian Navy Bathurst-class corvette, Bengal, through a narrow swept channel in the Malacca Strait, which had been marked by three Indian Navy minesweeper flotillas, towards Singapore. Her guns and men with rifles were kept busy, firing many rounds at the floating mines that were released. Petard was ordered to intercept a Japanese destroyer that turned out to be called Kamikaze. Taking a dispatch case from the Japanese ship and ignoring a request for a receipt, she sailed back to Cleopatra. She was then part of a force which included the cruiser Cumberland, which was sent to Batavia, in the Dutch East Indies. On her way back to Singapore after yet another escort mission, Petard ran into a tornado, which resulted in thousands of disoriented birds using the ship as a temporary perch. She was also involved in the uprising in Java; at one point ferrying Japanese prisoners of war from Tanjung Priok to an island near Singapore. In all, Petard crossed the equator eight more times in the area of the Dutch East Indies before sailing once again to Trincomalee in late March 1946. Over two months later she returned to Portsmouth.

== Post-war era ==
Petard was placed in reserve in Harwich in September 1946, being moved to Chatham in March 1951. In 1953 she was selected for conversion to a Type 16 fast anti-submarine frigate, with the new pennant number F26. She arrived at Devonport on 29 April 1953 under tow from Envoy; two days later she was towed to Belfast, arriving on 4 May. She was converted there by Harland and Wolff, being completed in December 1955. She was mothballed in Southampton and towed to Devonport where she was laid up until 1960. Petard was re-commissioned later that year and amongst other Home Fleet duties was used as a Sea Training Ship for Junior Seamen Trainees from HMS Ganges. She was declared for disposal in May 1964; under the 1965–1966 Naval Estimates, she entered Devonport dockyard on 31 January 1966 to de-equip and was broken up in 1967 by P. W. McLellan at Bo'ness.
