= HMS Dulverton (L63) =

Destroyer of the Royal Navy

Coordinates: 36°50′N 27°30′E

History

United Kingdom
- Name: HMS Dulverton
- Ordered: 4 September 1939
- Builder: Alexander Stephen and Sons, Govan
- Laid down: 16 July 1940
- Launched: 1 April 1941
- Commissioned: 28 September 1941
- Honours and awards: Libya 1942; Sirte 1942; Mediterranean 1942; Malta Convoys 1942; Sicily 1943; Salerno 1943; Aegean 1943
- Fate: Damaged and scuttled on 13 November 1943
- Badge: On a Field barry wavy of six White and Blue within an annulet per fess Red and Green, a Griffin's claw erased Red grasping a riding whip and an axe in saltire Gold.

General characteristics
- Class & type: Type II Hunt-class destroyer
- Displacement: 1,050 tons standard; 1,490 tons full load
- Length: 85.34 m
- Beam: 9.62 m
- Draught: 2.51 m (8 ft 3 in)
- Propulsion: 2 shaft Parsons geared turbines; 19,000 shp
- Speed: 25.5 knots (25½ kn full)
- Range: 3,600 nmi (6,670 km) at 14 knots (26 km/h)
- Complement: 164
- Armament: 6 × QF 4 in Mark XVI on twin mounts Mk. XIX; AAA – 2 × 4 12.7mm Vickers, 2 x 20 mm; 6 Thornycroft depth charge throwers

HMS Dulverton was a Type II Hunt-class destroyer of the Royal Navy. Launched in 1941, she saw service during the Second World War until being damaged by German aircraft in 1943 during the Battle of Leros, and was scuttled. The Commander during her last battle was Stuart Austen Buss, MVO, DSC, RN. He did not survive.

Dulverton was ordered from Alexander Stephen and Sons of Govan on the outbreak of war in 1939. She was laid down on 16 July 1940, and launched 1 April 1941. She was completed by September 1941.

== Service history ==
Dulverton participated in many operations, including escorting troop convoys bound for Suez Canal and the convoys to Malta including the first one to lift the siege there, supporting the British Eighth Army in North Africa, the Tobruk Raid, and the destruction of the German submarine U-559 with other destroyers and the Royal Air Force.

In October 1943 Dulverton was involved in the Dodecanese Campaign, as part of a force that was trying to capture the Greek islands of Kos and Leros on 20 October and again on 4 November. On 12 November, Dulverton returned to support the garrison on Leros which had just been invaded by the Germans. On 13 November, whilst five miles off the coast of Kos, she was attacked by German Do 217 E-5 aircraft from KG 100 using Hs 293 glider bombs, one of which struck Dulverton abreast of the bridge. Six officers and 114 ratings were evacuated from the ship before she was scuttled by HMS Belvoir, but three officers including the Captain of the 5th Destroyer Flotilla and 75 ratings were lost.

== Publications ==
- Colledge, J. J.; Warlow, Ben (2006) [1969]. Ships of the Royal Navy: The Complete Record of All Fighting Ships of the Royal Navy from the 15th Century to the Present (3rd Rev ed.). London: Chatham Publishing. ISBN 978-1-86176-281-8. OCLC 67375475.
- English, John (1987). The Hunts: a history of the design, development and careers of the 86 destroyers of this class built for the Royal and Allied Navies during World War II. England: World Ship Society. ISBN 0-905617-44-4.
