= Italian destroyer Giacomo Medici =

Italian La Masa-class destroyer

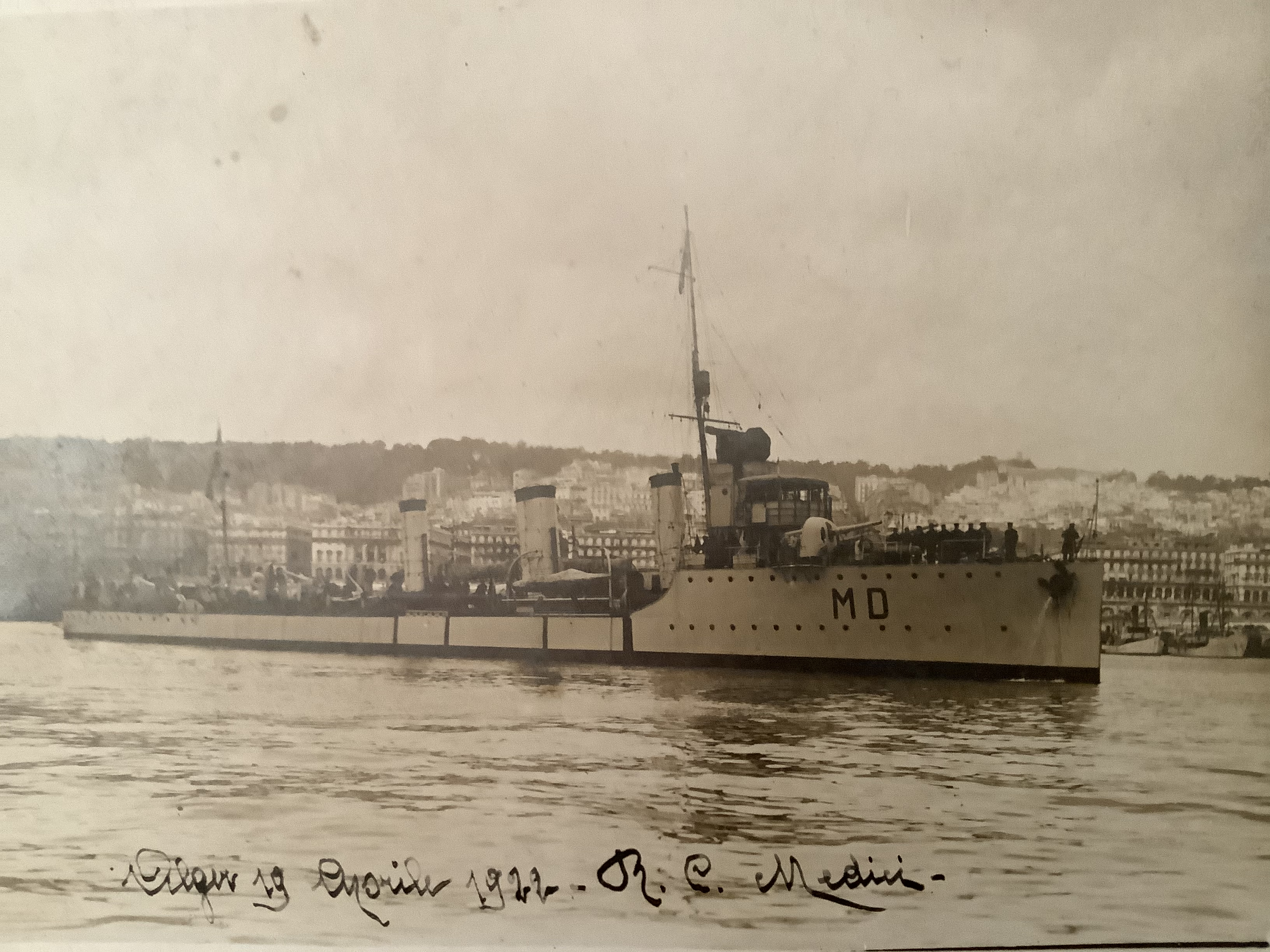
- Giacomo Medici off Algiers on 19 April 1922.

History

Kingdom of Italy
- Name: Giacomo Medici
- Namesake: Giacomo Medici (1817–1882), Italian general and politician
- Builder: Cantieri navali Odero, Sestri Ponente, Kingdom of Italy
- Laid down: 2 October 1916
- Launched: 6 September 1918
- Completed: 13 September 1918
- Commissioned: 13 September 1918
- Reclassified: Torpedo boat 1 October 1929
- Identification: Pennant number MD
- Motto: Signemus fidem sanguinis (Let Us Sign the Faith of Blood)
- Fate: Sunk 16 April 1943; Stricken 18 October 1946; Refloated 1952; Scrapped

General characteristics (as built)
- Type: Destroyer
- Displacement: 785 long tons (798 t) (standard); 851 long tons (865 t) (full load)
- Length: 72.5 m (237 ft 10 in) (waterline)
- Beam: 7.3 m (23 ft 11 in)
- Draught: 2.8 m (9 ft 2 in)
- Installed power: 15,500 shp (11,558 kW); maximum 17,000 shp (12,677 kW)
- Propulsion: 2 × Tosi steam turbines; 4 × Thornycroft boilers
- Speed: 33.6 knots (62.2 km/h; 38.7 mph)
- Range: 2,230 nmi (4,130 km; 2,570 mi) at 12.5 knots (23.2 km/h; 14.4 mph); 410 nmi (759 km; 472 mi) at 28.5 knots (52.8 km/h; 32.8 mph)
- Complement: 4 officers, 74 non-commissioned officers and sailors
- Armament: As built: 4 × 102 mm (4 in)/45 guns; 2 × 76.2 mm (3 in)/40 AA; 4 × 450 mm (18 in) torpedo tubes; 10 mines

Giacomo Medici was an Italian La Masa-class destroyer. Commissioned into service in the Italian Regia Marina ("Royal Navy") in 1918, she served in the final weeks of World War I. During the interwar period, she took part in operations during the Corfu incident in 1923 and was reclassified as a torpedo boat in 1929. During World War II, she took part in convoy escort operations in support of the Greco–Italian War as well as in the Mediterranean campaign until she was sunk in 1943.

== Construction and commissioning ==
Giacomo Medici was laid down at the Cantieri navali Odero (English: Odero Shipyard) in Sestri Ponente, Italy, on 2 October 1916. She was launched on 6 September 1918 and completed and commissioned on 13 September 1918.

== Service history ==
=== World War I ===
Giacomo Medici entered service in time to take part in the final weeks of World War I. She did not participate in any significant operations before the war ended in November 1918.

=== Interwar period ===
During the Corfu incident between Italy and the Kingdom of Greece, a force composed of Giacomo Medici, the battleships Conte di Cavour and Giulio Cesare, the armored cruisers San Giorgio and San Marco, the destroyers Generale Antonio Cascino, Generale Carlo Montanari, Giacinto Carini, and Giuseppe La Farina, the torpedo boat Premuda, the coastal torpedo boats 50 OS and 53 AS, the motor torpedo boats MAS 401, MAS 404, MAS 406, and MAS 408, and the submarines Agostino Barbarigo and Andrea Provana departed Taranto, Italy, on the evening of 30 August 1923 bound for Corfu with orders to occupy the island. The Italian ships arrived off Corfu on 31 August and communicated to the Greek governor of the island the conditions of surrender, which required lowering of the Greek flag and raising the Italian flag over the island, disarming all Greek soldiers and gendarmes, ceasing all communications, and ceding control of all activities on the island to Italian authorities. Not receiving a satisfactory answer to these damands, the Italian ships opened fire at 16:00, bombarding the Old Fortress and the New Fortress for 15 minutes. Refugees had taken shelter there, and the Italian bombardment killed 10 of them and injured several others. The Greek governor then surrendered and the Italian expeditionary force — made up of sailors from the Italian ships, the Italian Royal Army's 48th Infantry Regiment "Ferrara" (equipped with a battery of eight 75 mm guns), and an infantry brigade of 5,000 men — landed on Corfu. Most of the ships then returned to Taranto, but Giacomo Medici and the other four destroyers as well as one of the armored cruisers, the submarines, and the MAS boats remained at Corfu. Once Italy and Greece resolved their disagreement, the rest of the Italian ships and the expeditionary force on the island left Corfu between 24 and 29 September 1923.

Giacomo Medici was reclassified as a torpedo boat on 1 October 1929.

=== World War II ===
==== 1940 ====
===== June–October =====
World War II broke out in September 1939 with Nazi Germany's invasion of Poland. Fascist Italy joined the war on the side of the Axis powers with its invasion of France on 10 June 1940. At the time, Giacomo Medici was based at Brindisi, Italy, as part of the 7th Torpedo Boat Squadron, which also included the torpedo boats Angelo Bassini, Enrico Cosenz, and Nicola Fabrizi. She operated on escort duty along the shipping routes in the southern Adriatic Sea and between Italy and Greece until September 1942.

On 20 August 1940 the Regia Marina established the Comando Superiore Traffico Albania (Maritrafalba, the Albanian Higher Traffic Command), responsible for convoy escort services between Italy and Albania. Maritrafalba became active on 5 September 1940. Based at Brindisi, Giacomo Medici was assigned to Maritrafalba along with two elderly destroyers, nine other torpedo boats, three auxiliary cruisers, and the motor torpedo boats of the 13th MAS Squadron. On 5 September, Giacomo Medici got underway to join the auxiliary cruiser Barletta and the torpedo boat Palestro in escorting the motor ship Rossini and the steamer Italia, carrying a combined 1,090 men of the Italian Royal Army's 49th Infantry Division "Parma" and 97 tonnes (95 long tons; 107 short tons) of supplies, from Bari, Italy, to Durrës (known to the Italians as Durazzo), Albania. On 6 September, Giacomo Medici and Palestro escorted Italia and Rossini as they made their return voyage to Italy in ballast.

On 21 September 1940 Giacomo Medici escorted the steamer Hermada — carrying 140 cattle and 2,240 tonnes (2,200 long tons; 2,470 short tons) of artillery, commissary goods, clothing, and motor vehicles — from Brindisi to Vlorë (known to the Italians as Valona), Albania. On 26 September, Giacomo Medici, the torpedo boat Polluce and the auxiliary cruiser Ramb III, escorted Italia and Rossini, with a combined 1,950 soldiers and 128 tonnes (126 long tons; 141 short tons) of supplies, from Bari to Durrës. On 28 September Giacomo Medici got underway from Bari for Durrës, escorting the steamers Carmen, Giorgio Bottiglieri, and Tarquinia and the small tanker Abruzzi, all carrying civilian goods. At 18:39 or 18:40 that day, an underwater explosion took place that sank Carmen 5 nautical miles (9.3 km; 5.8 mi) from Durrës at 41°17′N 019°11′E. Giacomo Medici and other ships immediately set out from Durrës and rescued Carmen′s entire crew. Some of Carmen′s survivors claimed their ship had been torpedoed — probably, if they were correct, by the British submarine HMS Osiris — but the Regia Marina considered it most likely that Carmen had struck a mine.

On 1 October 1940 Giacomo Medici escorted the steamers Assiria, Oreste, and Premuda as they traveled in ballast from Durrës to Bari. On 4 October she joined the torpedo boat Pallade and the auxiliary cruiser Capitano Antonio Cecchi in escorting the motor ships Puccini and Verdi and the steamer Quirinale from Bari to Durrës, where they disembarked 2,400 soldiers and unloaded 140 tonnes (140 long tons; 150 short tons) of supplies. On 5 October Giacomo Medici and Pallade escorted Puccini, Quirinale, and Verdi as they made their return voyage in ballast from Durrës to Bari.

Maritrafalba was disbanded on 12 October 1940 but reconstituted on 21 October, and Giacomo Medici again was placed under its control along with the two elderly destroyers, nine other torpedo boats, four auxiliary cruisers, and the 13th MAS Squadron for convoy escort and antisubmarine patrol duty. At 04:15 on 21 October, Giacomo Medici left Brindisi and escorted the postal ships Filippo Grimani and Piero Foscari to Durrës. The ships departed Durrës the same day and returned to Brindisi, which they reached at 17:15. Giacomo Medici, Filippo Grimani, and Piero Foscari repeated the voyage on 22 October, steaming from Brindisi to Durrës and returning to Brindisi at 17:20.

===== Greco-Italian War =====
Giacomo Medici then was assigned temporarily to the Forza Navale Speciale (Special Naval Force). Tasked with occupying Corfu, the force, commanded by Ammiraglio di squadra (Squadron Admiral) Vittorio Tur, also included the light cruiser Bari (Tur's flagship), the light cruiser Taranto, the destroyers Augusto Riboty and Carlo Mirabello, the torpedo boats Altair, Andromeda, Angelo Bassini, Antares, Aretusa, and Nicola Fabrizi, and the tankers Garigliano, Sesia, and Tirso. Plans called for merchant ships to land the Royal Army's 47th Infantry Division "Bari" and a battalion of the Regia Marina′s Regiment "San Marco" on Corfu on 28 October 1940 — the day the Greco–Italian War broke out with Italy's invasion of Greece — but the amphibious landing was postponed due to rough seas, first to 30 October, then to 31 October, and then again to 2 November before it was cancelled because of the disappointing performance of Italian forces on the Greek front. The 47th Infantry Division "Bari" was reassigned to operations on the front in Epirus, and the merchant ships proceeded to Vlorë to disembark the division there.

Meanwhile, Giacomo Medici left Brindisi at 00:50 on 2 November 1940, with the torpedo boat General Antonio Cantore to escort a convoy composed of the steamers Capo Vado, Italia, and Tirso, the motor ships Città of Agrigento, Città di Bastia, Città di Savona, Città di Trapani, and Marin Sanudo and the landing ship Sesia as they transported 4,670 troops, 240 draft animals, 100 motor vehicles, 48 motorcycles, four trucks, three tanks, 16 light tanks, 11 carts, four ovens, nine artillery pieces, and two boats of the 47th Infantry Division "Bari" — initially assigned to the cancelled landing on Corfu — to Vlorë to reinforce Italian forces on the Greek front. The convoy reached Vlorë at 09:00 on 2 November, and Giacomo Medici subsequently returned to Brindisi.

Giacomo Medici got back underway from Brindisi at 03:49 on 4 November 1940, escorting the steamer Antonio Locatelli — carrying 80 soldiers, 142 motor vehicles, 17.3 tonnes (17.0 long tons; 19.1 short tons) of fuel and 4 tonnes (3.9 long tons; 4.4 short tons) of other supplies — to Durrës, which the two ships reached at 17:00 that day. At 03:00 on 6 November, Giacomo Medici and the torpedo boat Curtatone departed Vlorë, escorting the motor ship Donizetti and the steamers Italia, Piemonte, and Quirinale, which were returning to Italy in ballast. The ships arrived at Bari at 19:30 that day.

At 23:30 on 8 November 1940, Giacomo Medici, Capitano Antonio Cecchi, Curtatone, and Generale Antonio Cantore left Bari escorting the steamers Argentina, Firenze, and Italia and the motor ship Città di Marsala, carrying a combined 3,219 soldiers and 287 tonnes (282 long tons; 316 short tons) of supplies. The convoy reached Durrës at 16:00 on 9 November. At 16:00 on 10 November Giacomo Medici and Generale Antonio Cantore left Durrës escorting the same four ships as they returned to Italy in ballast. They arrived at Bari at 08:10 on 11 November.

At 19:00 on 13 November 1940 Giacomo Medici left Durrës with the torpedo boat General Marcello Prestinari escorting the motor ships Barbarigo, Puccini, and Verdi, which were returning in ballast to Bari, where they arrived at 13:30 on 14 November. On 15 November at 00:20, Giacomo Medici and the torpedo boat Francesco Stocco left Bari escorting the steamers Nautilus and Poseidone, carrying civilian goods, on a voyage to Vlorë, which they reached at 19:00.

Giacomo Medici and Curtatone left Vlorë at 07:00 on 17 November 1940 to escort the motor ship Maria and the steamers Sardegna and Tagliamento, proceeding to Italy in ballast. The ships arrived in port at 18:30, after which Giacomo Medici and Sardegna continued to Bari. At 01:00 on 19 November Giacomo Medici, Andromeda, and Capitano Antonio Cecchi departed Bari to escort the steamers Argentina and Sardegna — carrying 3,084 men and 162 tonnes (159 long tons; 179 short tons) of materials — to Vlorë, where they arrived 12 hours later.

At 04:50 on 23 November 1940, Giacomo Medici got underway from Vlorë escorting Argentina, Piemonte, and Sardegna, which were returning to Italy in ballast. The ships arrived at Bari at 24:00. On 28 November, Giacomo Medici and the auxiliary cruiser Lago Tana left Brindisi to escort Argentina, Città di Trapani, and Tagliamento — carrying 1,809 men, seven motor vehicles, 488 draft animals, and 592 tonnes (583 long tons; 653 short tons) of supplies — to Vlorë, where the ships arrived at 15:00.

==== 1941 ====
===== Greco-Italian War =====
On 24 January 1941 Giacomo Medici began her first operation of the year for Maritrafalba, leaving Bari at 20:00 and escorting the motor ship Marin Sanudo and the steamers Monstella and Zeno — carrying 183 soldiers, 1,286 draft animals, 192 motor vehicles, and 78 tonnes (77 long tons; 86 short tons) of supplies — to Durrës, where the ships arrived at 10:30 on 25 January. At 03:45 on 26 January, she set off from Durrës escorting the steamship Italia, the motor ship Puccini, and the military tanker Prometeo, returning in ballast to Bari, where they arrived at 23:00. On 27 January Giacomo Medici and the auxiliary cruiser Barletta left Bari at 19:00 to escort the motor ships Città di Alessandria, Città di Savona, Puccini, and Rossini — transporting 3,161 men and 1,726 tonnes (1,699 long tons; 1,903 short tons) of materials — to Durrës. The convoy arrived at Durrës at 09:10 on 28 January. Giacomo Medici returned to Bari the same day, escorting the steamers Luana, Rosandra, and Scarpanto, all of which were returning to Italy in ballast.

On 30 January 1941, Giacomo Medici and Barletta got underway from Bari at 00:00 to escort the motor ships Donizetti and Città di Tripoli and the steamers Caterina and Titania, which were carrying a total of 1,506 soldiers, 688 draft animals, and 128 tonnes (126 long tons; 141 short tons) of fodder and other supplies. The convoy arrived at Durrës at 14:00 after a 14-hour voyage, and Giacomo Medici left to return to Italy at 18:30 on 31 January, escorting Donizetti and the steamer Casaregis, both in ballast, to Bari, where they arrived at 08:00 on 1 February 1941. On 2 February, Giacomo departed Bari at 22:00 with the auxiliary cruiser Città di Genova to escort the motor ship Verdi and the steamers Italia, Milano, and Quirinale — carrying 3,947 soldiers and 289 tonnes (284 long tons; 319 short tons) of supplies — to Durrës, which the convoy reached on the morning of 3 February. At 20:30 on 4 February, Giacomo Medici left Durrës escorting Italia, Quirinale, and the steamer Zena, all in ballast and headed for Bari, where they arrived at 23:35.

On 5 February 1941, Giacomo Medici and Barletta got underway from Bari at 23:00 to escort the motor ships Città di Alessandria, Città di Bastia, Narenta, and Puccini to Durrës, where they arrived at 13:00 on 6 February to disembark 2,261 soldiers and unload 330.5 tonnes (325.3 long tons; 364.3 short tons) of supplies and 218 tonnes (215 long tons; 240 short tons) of other materials. On 9 February, Giacomo Medici escorted the merchant ships Iseo, Tergestea, and Verdi from Durrës to Brindisi, where Tergestea and Verdi remained while Giacomo Medici escorted Iseo to Bari. Giacomo Medici got back underway at 02:00 on 11 February to escort the motor ship Barbarigo and the steamers Laura C., Sant'Agata, and Tagliamento — carrying 139 men, 526 draft animals, 242 motor vehicles, and 73 tonnes (72 long tons; 80 short tons) of supplies — to Durrës, where the convoy arrived at 15:45. She left Durrës at 03:30 on 12 February, escorting the motor ships Città di Savona, Città di Tripoli and Rossini as they made a voyage in ballast to Bari, which they reached at 18:30. On 16 February, Giacomo Medici left Brindisi at 18:30 escorting the steamers Diana, with 56 soldiers and 397 draft animals aboard, and Iseo, which had loaded various supplies at Bari, to Vlorë. The ships arrived at Vlorë at 16:00. On 18 February, Giacomo Medici and the auxiliary cruiser Brindisi left Vlorë at 13:30 escorting the motor ship Città di Agrigento and the steamer Argentina, both carrying wounded men, and the steamer Monstella, in ballast, to Brindisi, arriving there at 22:35.

At 18:40 on 20 February 1941 Giacomo Medici and the auxiliary cruiser Brioni left Bari to escort the motor ships Città di Bastia, Città di Tripoli and Puccini and the steamer Mameli, carrying a combined 1,965 soldiers, 4,181 tonnes (4,115 long tons; 4,609 short tons) of supplies for them, and 108 tonnes (106 long tons; 119 short tons) of other supplies. The convoy reached Durrës at 22:10 on 21 February. At 0900 on 24 February Giacomo Medici left Durrës bound for Bari as escort for a convoy consisting of the steamers Rosandra, Sagitta, and Zena, all in ballast. The convoy reached Bari at 23:30. At 18:00 on 26 February Giacomo Medici got back underway from Bari to escort the steamers Caterina, Contarini, Sant'Agata, and Tagliamento, carrying 145 soldiers, 1,131 draft animals, 6.5 tonnes (6.4 long tons; 7.2 short tons) of fodder and 1,907 tonnes (1,877 long tons; 2,102 short tons) of other materials. The convoy arrived at Durrës at 10:45 on 27 February. At 17:50 on 1 March 1941, Giacomo Medici set off from Durrës headed for Bari, escorting the steamer Tagliamento and the motor ships Burmania and Tergestea, all in ballast. The ships arrived at 07:30 on 2 March.

Giacomo Medici and Brioni got underway from Bari at 00:00 on 3 March 1941 escorting the steamer Italia and the motor ships Città di Alessandria, Città di Savona, and Riv. Transporting 2,478 soldiers, 136 motor vehicles, and 310 tonnes (310 long tons; 340 short tons) of supplies, the convoy arrived at Durrës at 14:00 on the same day. At 00:30 on 4 March, Giacomo Medici left Durrës to escort the steamers Aventino and Milano, in ballast, and the motor ship Rossini, which was carrying 235 lightly injured men, to Bari. The ships reached Bari at 20:50. Giacomo Medici left Bari at 00:30 on 6 March with Capitano Antonio Cecchi escorting the steamers Aventino and Milano and the motor ships Narenta and Rossini to Durrës, where they arrived at 11:40 to disembark 3,171 men, 137 draft animals, 239 tonnes (235 long tons; 263 short tons) of provisions and 248 tonnes (244 long tons; 273 short tons) of other supplies. At 06:20 on 8 March, Giacomo Medici left Durrës escorting Barbarigo, Milano, and Rossini, all returning to Italy in ballast. The ships arrived at Bari at 17:15.

At 03:25 on 19 March 1941 Giacomo Medici and the auxiliary cruiser Francesco Morosini left Brindisi escorting the motor ships Città di Agrigento and Città di Marsala, headed for Vlorë, where they arrived at 13:00 to disembark 1,337 soldiers and 19 tonnes (19 long tons; 21 short tons) of supplies. At 19:30 the same day, she got back underway to escort Città di Agrigento and Città di Marsala on a return voyage in ballast, reaching Brindisi at 04:20 on 20 March. At 06:10 on 20 March, Giacomo Medici and the torpedo boat Altair left Brindisi and escorted the steamers Argentina, Diana, and Piemonte — carrying a combined 3,869 men and 612 tonnes (602 long tons; 675 short tons) of materials — to Vlorë, where they arrived at 12:15. At 20:00 the same day, Giacomo Medici set off from Vlorë escorting Argentina and Piemonte, both in ballast, with which she arrived at Brindisi at 03:00 on 21 March. Giacomo Medici departed Brindisi at 05:10 on 22 March escorting the steamers Contarini, Miseno, and Nurage and the motor ship Carlotta, which were carrying a load of 426 tonnes (419 long tons; 470 short tons) of diesel fuel, 500 tonnes (492 long tons; 551 short tons) of fodder, 830 tonnes (817 long tons; 915 short tons) of gasoline (petrol), and 1,788 tonnes (1,760 long tons; 1,971 short tons) of other supplies, arriving in Durrës at 16:45. On 23 March, Giacomo Medici left Durrës at 17:00 bound for Bari, escorting the steamers Carmela, Esterina, and Pontinia, all in ballast. The ships reached their destination at 15:30 on 24 March.

Giacomo Medici and Brioni left Bari on 25 March 1941 at 20:00, escorting Italia, Quirinale, and Rossini, which were carrying 3,107 men and 630 tonnes (620 long tons; 694 short tons) of supplies. The convoy reached Durrës at 08:00 on 26 March. At 21:45 that evening, Giacomo Medici got back underway, escorting Barbarigo, Italia, and Quirinale, all in ballast, and the ships arrived at Bari at 09:00 on 27 March. At 19:00 on 27 March Giacomo Medici and the auxiliary cruiser Brindisi left Bari bound for Durrës, escorting the motor ships Città di Savona, Città di Trapani, Città di Tripoli, and Donizetti, which were carrying a combined 2,717 men and 380 tonnes (374 long tons; 419 short tons) of supplies. The ships arrived at 09:00 on 28 March. At 20:00 that evening, Giacomo Medici left Durrës escorting Città di Tripoli, with 195 lightly wounded men on board, and the steamers Istria, Triton Maris, and Zena, all in ballast. The convoy reached Bari at 11:45 on 29 March. On 30 March 30, Giacomo Medici and Brindisi left Bari at 21:30 escorting the steamer Monstella and the motor ship Riv, loaded with 99 soldiers, 687 draft animals, 122 motor vehicles, and 922 tonnes (907 long tons; 1,016 short tons) of supplies. They arrived at Durrës at 15:15 on 31 March. On 2 April 1941 at 03:30, Giacomo Medici departed Durrës escorting the steamers Aventino, operating on postal service, and Campidoglio, in ballast, to Bari, where they arrived at 18:00.

On 3 April 1941 at 01:30, Giacomo Medici left Bari escorting the steamers Diana, Luana, and Tagliamento, which were carrying 73 soldiers, 432 draft animals, 94 motor vehicles, and 964 tonnes (949 long tons; 1,063 short tons) of materials. The convoy arrived at Durrës at 14:45. At 01:00 on 4 April, Giacomo Medici began a voyage from Durrës to Bari, escorting the motor ship Donizetti and the steamers Bolsena and Perla, all in ballast. The convoy arrived at Bari at 16:40.

At 00:00 on 6 April 1941 — the day that Germany began a decisive intervention in the Greco–Italian War — Giacomo Medici and Barletta left Bari and headed for Durrës, escorting Città di Agrigento and Città di Trapani, which were loaded with 1,265 soldiers, three motor vehicles, and 15 tonnes (15 long tons; 17 short tons) of supplies. The ships arrived at 16:30. Immediately afterwards, Giacomo Medici and Barletta took over the escort of a convoy composed of the steamer Italia and the motor ships Città di Marsala, Puccini, and Rossini, all in ballast, which had left Durrës at 16:00. The convoy arrived at Bari at 07:00 on 7 April. At 02:00 on 8 April Giacomo Medici set out from Brindisi bound for Vlorë escorting the steamers Aprilia and Ascianghi, which were carrying 514.5 tonnes (506.4 long tons; 567.1 short tons) of hay and oats and 78 tonnes (77 long tons; 86 short tons) of frozen meat. The convoy arrived at 14:30. Giacomo Medici got back underway at 08:15 on 9 April, departing Vlorë and escorting the steamers Dormio, Leonardo Palomba, Pontinia, and Tripolino, which arrived in Brindisi at 19:30.

At Brindisi on 19 April 1941 Giacomo Medici took over escort duties from the auxiliary cruiser Brioni of a convoy made up of the steamers Iseo, Sagitta, Tergestea, and Vesta, transporting a total of nine soldiers, 101 motor vehicles, 2,422 tonnes (2,384 long tons; 2,670 short tons) of ammunition, 1,480 tonnes (1,457 long tons; 1,631 short tons) of supplies, and 5,546 tonnes (5,458 long tons; 6,113 short tons) of other materials. The convoy left Bari at 22:30 that day and arrived in Durrës at 15:20 on 20 April, the day that the Kingdom of Greece surrendered to Germany. At 00:30 on 22 April Giacomo Medici set out from Durrës escorting the steamers Anna Martini, Carmela, and Loreto, all in ballast, with which she arrived at Bari at 19:00 the same day. On 23 April 1941, Greece surrendered to Italy, bringing the Greco–Italian War to an end.

===== April–December =====
On 25 April 1941, Giacomo Medici and Brindisi left Bari at 21:00 to escort the steamer Aventino and the motor ships Donizetti and Narenta to Durrës, where they arrived at 09:00 on 27 1941 with 1,136 soldiers and 1,365 tonnes (1,343 long tons; 1,505 short tons) of supplies on board. On 29 April, Giacomo Medici and the destroyer Carlo Mirabello set off from Durrës at 05:00 escorting the steamers Aventino, Donizetti, and Narenta, all in ballast, and the postal steamer Campidoglio. Campidoglio left the convoy at Brindisi, and the rest of the convoy proceeded to Bari, where it arrived at 19:15. On 30 April at 18:00, Giacomo Medici left Bari escorting the steamers Silvano and Zena, reaching Durrës at 12:20 on 1 May. Giacomo Medici returned quickly to Bari, from which she departed at 21:00 the same day with Brindisi, escorting the motor ships Città di Tripoli and Donizetti and the steamer Laura C., which were transporting 733 soldiers and 2,100 tonnes (2,067 long tons; 2,315 short tons) of supplies. The convoy arrived at Durrës at 11:30am on 2 May. Meanwhile, Giacomo Medici and Brindisi took over the escort of the steamer Milano and the motor ship Città di Marsala, which were returning from Albania to Bari with 2,000 soldiers and a load of materials on board. That convoy reached Bari at 24:00.

At 23:00 on 4 May 1941, Giacomo Medici and Brindisi left Bari to escort the steamers Aventino, Italia, Milano, and Quirinale, which were carrying 3520 men and a load of materials, escorting them to Durrës, where they arrived at 10:30 on 5 May. On 6 May at 03:00, Giacomo Medici and Brindisi left Durrës escorting the same four steamers on their return voyage to Italy. They reached Bari at 15:30, carrying 6,528 soldiers, as well as materials. On 7 May, Giacomo Medici got underway from Bari escorting the motor ship Narenta, carrying a load of materials, and, after stopping at Brindisi, where the postal steamer Campidoglio joined the convoy, set course for Durrës, where the ships arrived at 11:30 on 8 May. On 9 May Giacomo Medici left Durrës at 05:30 to escort Campidoglio, still in postal service, to Brindisi, where she arrived at 13:00.

On 11 May 1941, Giacomo Medici left Brindisi at 03:00 with the auxiliary cruiser Zara to escort the steamer Francesco Crispi, carrying troops and supplies, to Vlorë, where they arrived after a six-hour voyage. Giacomo Medici and Zara got back underway at 14:45 on 11 May, leaving Vlorë and escorting Francesco Crispi, now with 700 prisoners-of-war aboard, to Brindisi, where they arrived at 20:30. At 01:30 on 15 May, Giacomo Medici departed Brindisi bound for Vlorë escorting the motor ship Città di Agrigento and the steamer Poseidone, transporting personnel and supplies. The ships arrived at Vlorë at 09:15, and Giacomo Medici put back to sea with Zara at 03:30 on 18 May to escort Aventino, Italia, Milano and Puccini to Bari, where they arrived at 18:00 and discharged 3,900 soldiers and a load of motor vehicles and materials.

On 5 June 1941, Giacomo Medici and Brioni escorted the motor ships Città di Bastia and Città di Marsala and from Durrës to Bari, and on 7 June she and Zara left Vlorë to escort the motor ship Città di Tripoli and the steamers Francesco Crispi and Galilea to Italy. Zara left the convoy at Brindisi while Giacomo Medici escorted the three merchant ships he rest of the way to Bari. On 10 June Giacomo Medici escorted the steamers Caterina and Istria and the motor ship Marin Sanudo, loaded with troops and supplies, from Bari to Durrës, and on 15 June she and Brindisi escorted Città di Marsala and Italia on a voyage from Bari to Durrës with troops and materials on board. On 16 June Giacomo Medici and Brindisi again escorted Città di Marsala and Italia as they proceeded from Durrës to Bari carrying troops and materials, while on 19 June Giacomo Medici and Zara escorted the steamer Argentina and the motor ship Viminale as they transported military materials from Vlorë to Brindisi. On 22 June Giacomo Medici and Brioni escorted the motor ships Città di Alessandria and Città di Tripoli from Bari to Brindisi and then to Missolonghi, known to the Italians as Missolungi) in Axis-occupied Greece, while on 29 June she and the auxiliary cruiser Olbia escorted the steamers Francesco Crispi and Galilea, loaded with military personnel and material, from Brindisi to Patras in Greece. On 30 June, Giacomo Medici and Zara escorted Aventino, Italia, Quirinale, and Rossini from Bari to Durrës, where they delivered military personnel and materials.

On 1 July 1941 Giacomo Medici and Zara first escorted Aventino, Italia, Quirinale, and Rossini — carrying a combined 4,290 soldiers and a load of materials — from Durrës to Bari. They next escorted the German steamers Castellon, Procida, and Trapani, loaded with German personnel and material, from Patras to Taranto. On 7 July Giacomo Medici escorted to the motor ship Viminale and the steamer Argentina — transporting personnel of the Royal Army and the Regia Marina bound for various destinations — from Brindisi to Vlorë. On 8 July Giacomo Medici escorted Argentina and Viminale from Vlorë to Brindisi, while on 9 July she escorted the steamer Rosandra on a voyage from Brindisi to Durrës carrying military personnel and material.

On 10 July 1941 Giacomo Medici and Zara escorted Aventino, Città di Marsala, Milano, and Rosandra — with a combined 3,580 soldiers and 1,400 militarized workers aboard — from Durrës to Bari, while on 11 July Giacomo Medici alone escorted Argentina and Viminale as they transported Royal Army and Regia Marina personnel from Brindisi to Vlorë. On 12 July she and Barletta escorted Argentina, Puccini, and Viminale as they transported 2,610 soldiers from Vlorë to Brindisi, and on 13 July they escorted Aventino and Rosandra — carrying military personnel headed to various destinations — on the Bari–Durrës route. On 14 July the two ships escorted Aventino and Rosandra from Durrës to Brindisi and then to Bari, this time loaded with troops returning to Italy.

On 19 July 1941, Giacomo Medici, Francesco Stocco, and Zara escorted Aventino, Città di Marsala, Italia, and Milano, carrying troops and materials, from Durrës to Kotor (known to the Italians as Cattaro). On 20 July Giacomo Medici and Barletta escorted Puccini, Quirinale, and Rossini as they transported troops and supplies from Durrës to Kotor, while on 21 July the two ships escorted Città di Marsala, Italia, Puccini, and Quirinale from Kotor to Durrës. On 22 July the two ships escorted Aventino, Città di Marsala, and Milano from Durrës to Kotor, and on 25 July Giacomo Medici and Brindisi escorted the steamer Rosandra, with 1,420 soldiers aboard, from Durrës to Brindisi. On 28 July Giacomo Medici escorted the motor ship Calitea — headed for Rhodes carrying 600 soldiers and 230 tonnes (226 long tons; 254 short tons) of supplies for the Italian military garrisons stationed on the islands of the Italian Dodecanese in the Aegean Sea — on the leg of Calitea′s voyage from Brindisi to Patras. On 30 July Giacomo Medici and the auxiliary cruiser Attilio Deffenu escorted from Brindisi to Patras the steamers Aventino (bound ultimately for Rhodes) and Italia, transporting Royal Army personnel headed for various destinations.

On 4 August 1941 Giacomo Medici escorted the motor ship Calitea from Patras to Brindisi, while on 9 August she and Brindisi escorted the motor ship Città di Marsala and the steamer Quirinale during a voyage in which they transported 1,500 soldiers from Durrës to Bari. On 10 August, Giacomo Medici and Brindisi escorted the steamers Maria and Milano — loaded with troops, motor vehicles, trailers, and other military materials — from Bari to Durrës. On 11 August the two ships escorted the steamers Milano and Rosandra as they made a voyage from Durrës to Bari with 1,500 soldiers and a load of motor vehicles and other materials aboard. On 21 August, Giacomo Medici escorted the steamer Lido from Bari to Sarandë (known to the Italians as Porto Edda) in Albania, while on 23 August she and Brindisi escorted Quirinale and the motor ships Città di Alessandria and Città di Bastia from Durrës to Bari during their voyage with 2,400 soldiers aboard. On 26 August Giacomo Medici and Attilio Deffenu escorted the steamers Argentina, Aventino, and Quirinale, with troops, motor vehicles, and supplies aboard, from Brindisi to Patras. On 30 August, Giacomo Medici escorted the steamship Alfredo Oriani as she transported troops from Kalamata (known to the Italians as Calamatta), Greece, to Patras. On the afternoon of 30 August 1941 Giacomo Medici rescued from rafts 20 survivors of the steamer Cilicia, which a submarine had sunk on 28 August in the Ionian Sea southwest of the Peloponnese.

On 4 September 1941, Giacomo Medici and Barletta escorted the steamers Galilea and Quirinale and the motor ship Viminale, all carrying troops, from Patras to Brindisi. On 18 September, Giacomo Medici and Brindisi escorted the steamers Aventino, Italia, and Rosandra as they transported troops and supplies from Bari to Durrës, while on 19 September they escorted the same three steamers on a voyage carrying 2,470 soldiers from Durrës to Bari. On 22 September Giacomo Medici escorted the steamer Gala from Taranto to Preveza (known to the Italians as Prevesa) in Greece, while on 29 September, again with Brindisi, she escorted Italia and Rosandra, carrying a combined 2,600 soldiers, from Durrës to Bari.

On 6 October 1941 Giacomo Medici and the auxiliary cruiser Arborea escorted Italia, Milano, and Rosandra, transporting military personnel headed for various destinations, from Bari to Durrës, and on 7 October they escorted the same three steamers returning from Durrës to Bari transporting the Royal Army's 7th Infantry Division "Lupi di Toscana". On 13 October Giacomo Medici escorted the motor ship Città di Trapani, carrying ammunition and other materials, on a voyage from Brindisi to Vlorë. On 16 October she escorted the steamer Devoli and motor ship Donizetti, loaded with troops, on the Vlorë–Brindisi route.

On 19 October 1941 Giacomo Medici and Zara escorted Aventino, Italia, Milano, and Rosandra from Bari to Durrës, where the merchant ships disembarked personnel of the Regia Marina and the Italian Regia Aeronautica (Royal Air Force). On 21 October, the two ships escorted the same four steamers, carrying 4,400 soldiers as well as motor vehicles, trailers, and other materials, from Durrës to Bari. On 23 October they escorted Aventino, Italia, and Rosandra, carrying troops and supplies, from Bari to Durrës. On 25 October Giacomo Medici and Zara escorted Aventino, Italia, Milano, and Rosandra from Durrës to Bari on a voyage in which the four steamers carried 3,400 soldiers, while on 29 October they escorted Aventino, Galilea, Italia, and Rosandra as they transported troops and supplies from Bari to Durrës. On 1 November, Giacomo Medici and Zara escorted the steamers Italia, Milano, Piemonte, and Rosandra — carrying a combined 5,400 soldiers — from Durrës to Bari.

Giacomo Medici subsequently underwent modification which saw the removal of one 102-millimetre (4 in) gun and the replacement of her 76-millimetre (3 in) guns with six 20-millimetre autocannons.

==== 1942 ====
After the completion of her modifications, Giacomo Medici resumed her convoy escort duties in the southern Adriatic Sea in 1942. On 7 April 1942 she left Bari with the auxiliary cruiser Brioni, the destroyer Euro, and the torpedo boat Angelo Bassini to escort the steamers Aventino, Italia, Ogaden, and Titania to Durrës. Angelo Bassini and Aventino had to return to Bari after colliding with one another, but the rest of the convoy reached Durrës. On 9 April Giacomo Medici and Brioni escorted Italia, carrying soldiers, from Durrës to Bari. On 22 April Giacomo Medici escorted the tanker Dora C. from Bari to Vlorë, while on 26 April she and the auxiliary cruiser Arborea escorted the steamer Monstella, carrying military personnel and materials, from Bari to Durrës.

On 7 May 1942 Giacomo Medici, Francesco Stocco, and the auxiliary cruiser Lorenzo Marcello escorted Donizetti and Quirinale, carrying troops and supplies, from Bari to Zakynthos (known to the Italians as Zante) in the Ionian Islands, and then from Zakynthos to Bari carrying soldiers returning to Italy. On 10 May, Giacomo Medici and Arborea escorted the steamers Diocleziano, Ezilda Croce, and Probita from Brindisi to Patras, and on 13 May they escorted the steamers Alba Julia, Balkan, and Rosario from Patras to Brindisi. On 16 May Giacomo Medici escorted Dora C. from Bari to Vlorë, while on 20 May she and Brioni escorted Aventino and Italia, loaded with troops and supplies, on the Bari-Durrës route. On 27 May Giacomo Medici and Arborea escorted Italia and Rosandra as they transported troops from Durrës to Bari, while on 30 May Giacomo Medici, Brioni, and the torpedo boat Generale Antonino Cascino escorted Italia, Rosandra, and the cargo steamer Chisone, carrying troops and materials, from Bari to Durrës.

On 8 June 1942 Giacomo Medici, Brioni, and Generale Antonino Cascino escorted Aventino and Rosandra, transporting troops and supplies, from Bari to Durrës. On 9 July Giacomo Medici and Brioni escorted Aventino, carrying troops and supplies, from Bari to Durrës, and then joined Lorenzo Marcello in escorting the steamer Milano as she made a voyage from Durrës to Bari carrying troops returning to Italy. On 16 July Giacomo Medici escorted the motor ship Calino from Bari to Patras. Leaving Calino at Patras to continue her voyage to Rhodes, Giacomo Medici returned to the convoy routes in the southern Adriatic Sea, where on 20 July she and Brioni escorted to Quirinale as she transported soldiers from Durrës to Bari. On 2 August Giacomo Medici, Zara, and the destroyer Sebenico escorted the motor ship Donizetti and the steamer Quirinale from Bari to Durazzo, Durrës while on 18 August Giacomo Medici escorted the steamers Brundisium, Dielpi, and Goggiam, loaded with various materials, from Brindisi to Patras.

On 12 September 1942, Giacomo Medici escorted the steamers Dubac and Tagliamento from Brindisi to Patras, while on 16 September she escorted the tanker Giorgio and the steamer Mameli from Preveza via Taranto to Brindisi. On 28 September she completed her last escort mission on the eastern convoy routes, escorting the steamer Dandolo from Gallipoli, Italy, to Patras. She subsequently was reassigned to convoy escort routes between Italy and North Africa.

=== 1943 ===
Giacomo Medici operated in support of Axis forces in the North African campaign into the spring of 1943. On 16 April 1943, she was moored at Catania, Sicily, when at 13:30 B-24 Liberator bombers of the United States Army Air Forces Ninth Air Force began bombing the port, seriously damaging the city and killing 146 civilians. An hour after the air raid began, bombs struck Giacomo Medici near her bridge and she began to sink by the bow. She rolled onto her starboard side and sank.

World War II ended in Europe in May 1945. On 18 October 1946, Giacomo Medici was stricken from the naval register. Her wreck was refloated in 1952 and subsequently scrapped.
