= Italian destroyer Angelo Bassini =

Italian La Masa-class destroyer

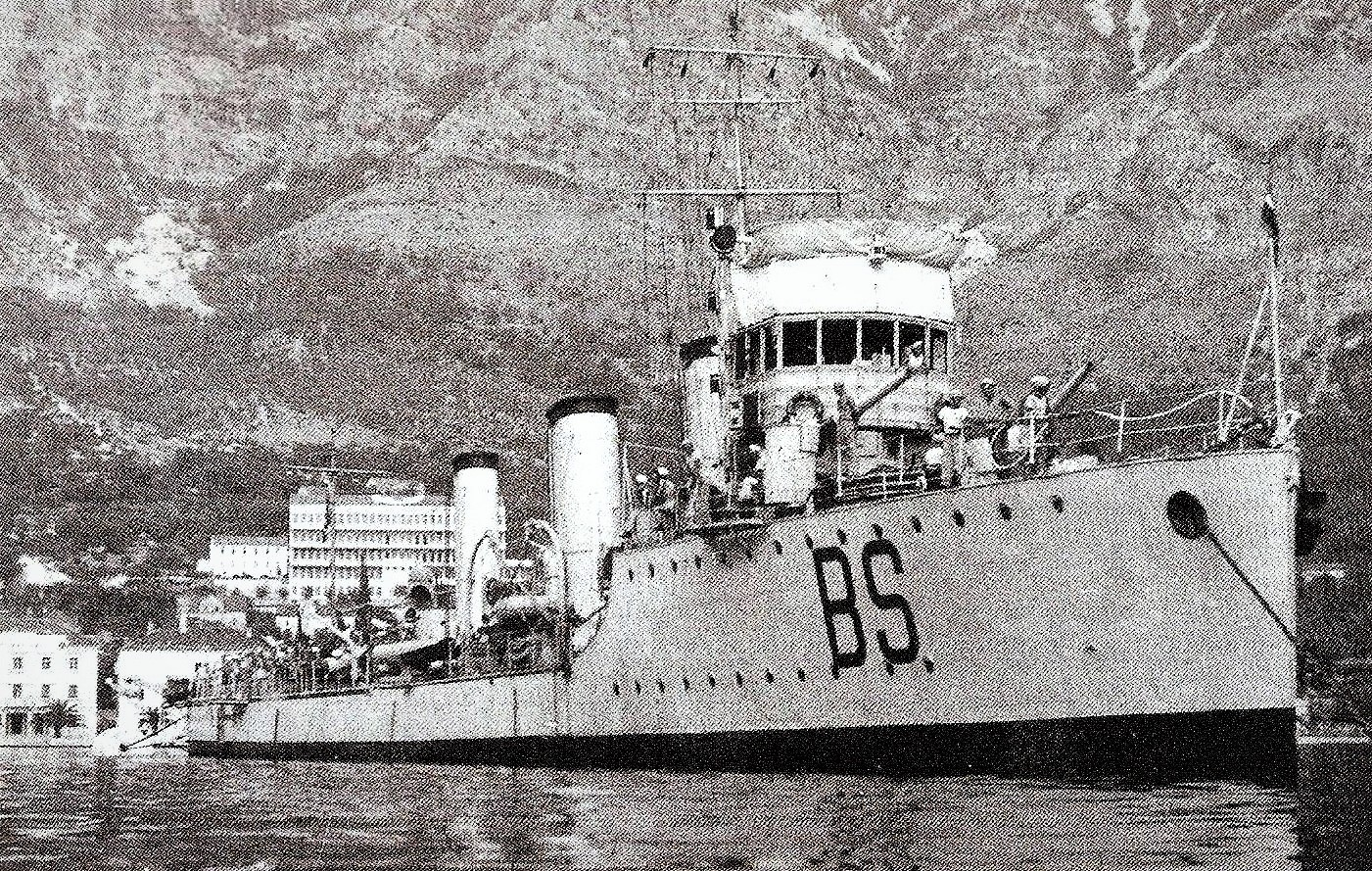
- Angelo Bassini anchored at Kotor in the early summer of 1941.

History

Kingdom of Italy
- Name: Angelo Bassini
- Namesake: Angelo Bassini (1815–1889), Italian soldier and patriot
- Builder: Cantieri navali Odero, Sestri Ponente, Kingdom of Italy
- Laid down: 2 October 1916
- Launched: 28 March 1918
- Completed: 1 May 1918
- Commissioned: 1 May 1918
- Identification: Pennant number BS
- Motto: Nemini cedit (No One Gives In)
- Reclassified: Torpedo boat 1 October 1929
- Fate: Sunk 28 May 1943; Stricken 18 October 1946; Refloated 1946; Scrapped

General characteristics (as built)
- Type: Destroyer
- Displacement: 785 long tons (798 t) (standard); 851 long tons (865 t) (full load)
- Length: 72.5 m (237 ft 10 in) (waterline)
- Beam: 7.3 m (23 ft 11 in)
- Draught: 2.8 m (9 ft 2 in)
- Installed power: 15,500 shp (11,558 kW); maximum 17,000 shp (12,677 kW)
- Propulsion: 2 × Tosi steam turbines; 4 × Thornycroft boilers
- Speed: 33.6 knots (62.2 km/h; 38.7 mph)
- Range: 2,230 nmi (4,130 km; 2,570 mi) at 12.5 knots (23.2 km/h; 14.4 mph); 410 nmi (759 km; 472 mi) at 28.5 knots (52.8 km/h; 32.8 mph)
- Complement: 4 officers, 74 non-commissioned officers and sailors
- Armament: As built: 4 × 102 mm (4 in)/45 guns; 2 × 76.2 mm (3 in)/40 AA; 4 × 450 mm (18 in) torpedo tubes; 10 mines

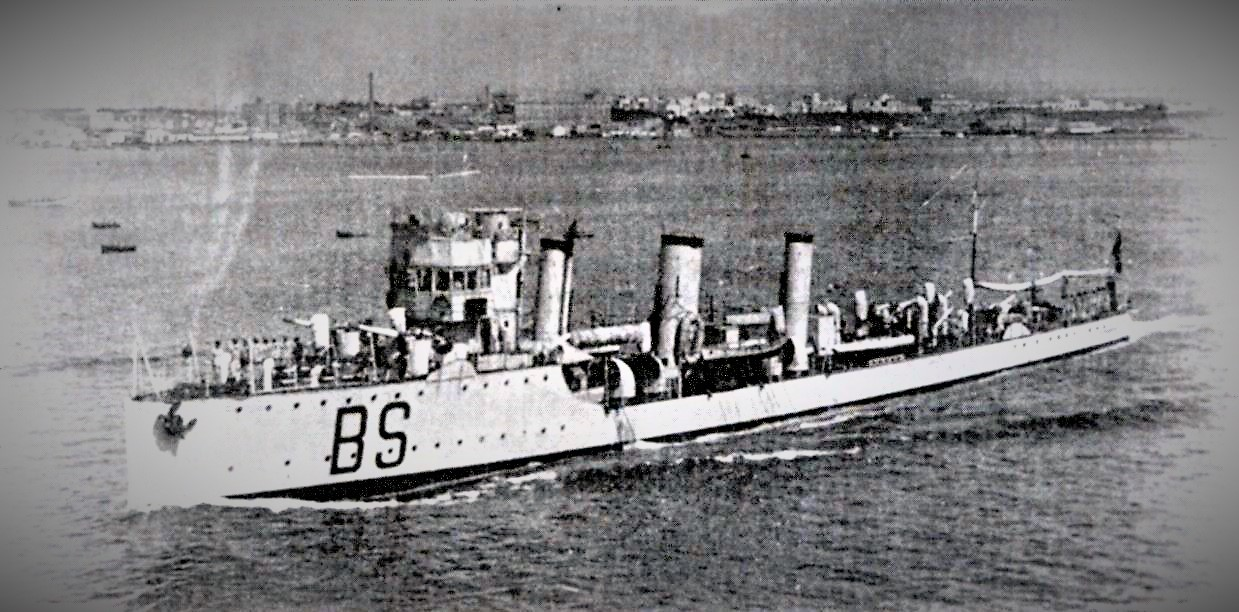
Angelo Bassini sometime between 1930 and 1941.

Angelo Bassini was an Italian La Masa-class destroyer. Commissioned into service in the Italian Regia Marina ("Royal Navy") in 1918, she served in the final months of World War I, participating in the Adriatic campaign. During the interwar period, she was reclassified as a torpedo boat in 1929. During World War II, she took part in the Adriatic campaign, operations in support of the Greco–Italian War, the Mediterranean campaign, and the Tunisian campaign until she was sunk in 1943.

== Construction and commissioning ==
Angelo Bassini was laid down at the Cantieri navali Odero (English: Odero Shipyard) in Sestri Ponente, Italy, on 2 October 1916. She was launched on 28 March 1918 and completed and commissioned on 1 May 1918.

== Service history ==
=== World War I ===
Angelo Bassini entered service in time to take part in the final months of World War I. She participated in the Adriatic campaign but not in any significant operations before the war ended in November 1918.

=== Interwar period ===
In 1922, the city of La Spezia awarded battle ensigns to Angelo Bassini, the scout cruisers Falco and Guglielmo Pepe, and the torpedo boat Premuda.

In 1929, Angelo Bassini and her sister ships Giacinto Carini, Giuseppe La Farina, and Nicola Fabrizi formed the 5th Destroyer Squadron, which together with the five-ship 6th Destroyer Squadron and the scout cruiser Carlo Mirabello constituted the 3rd Flotilla of the 2nd Torpedo Boat Division, a component of the 2nd Squadron, based at Taranto, Italy. Angelo Bassini was reclassified as a torpedo boat on 1 October 1929.

Capitano de vascello (Ship-of-the-Line Lieutenant) Giovanni Barbini took command of Angelo Bassini in November 1939. He left her about a year later to take command of Nicola Fabrizi, a role in which he received the Gold Medal of Military Valor for his actions during the Action in the Strait of Otranto in November 1940.

=== World War II ===
==== 1940 ====
===== June–October =====
World War II broke out in September 1939 with Nazi Germany's invasion of Poland. Fascist Italy joined the war on the side of the Axis powers with its invasion of France on 10 June 1940. At the time, Angelo Bassini was based at Brindisi, Italy, as part of the 7th Torpedo Boat Squadron, which also included Nicola Fabrizi and the torpedo boats Enrico Cosenz and Giacomo Medici. She operated on escort duty along the shipping routes in the southern Adriatic Sea and between Italy and Greece.

On 20 August 1940 the Regia Marina established the Comando Superiore Traffico Albania (Maritrafalba, the Albanian Higher Traffic Command), responsible for convoy escort services between Italy and the Italian protectorate of Albania. Based at Brindisi, Angelo Bassini was assigned to Maritrafalba along with two elderly destroyers, nine other torpedo boats, three auxiliary cruisers, and the motor torpedo boats of the 13th MAS Squadron. Maritrafalba became active on 5 September 1940, and on 17 September 1940 Angelo Bassini escorted the motor ship Filippo Grimani, operating as a postal vessel, from Brindisi to Durrës (known to the Italians as Durazzo), Albania, and later the same day she escorted Filippo Grimani′s sister ship Piero Foscari from Durrës to Brindisi. On 18 September she again escorted Piero Foscari, this time from Brindisi to Durrës, and then escorted Filippo Grimani from Durrës to Brindisi. On 19 September she escorted Filippo Grimani from Brindisi to Durrës and then Piero Foscari on the opposite route. On 20 September she escorted Piero Foscari from Brindisi to Durrës and then Filippo Grimani from Durrës to Brindisi. She continued this pattern over the next two days, escorting Filippo Grimani from Brindisi to Durrës and then Piero Foscari and the motor ship Narenta from Durrës to Brindisi on 21 September, and Piero Foscari from Brindisi to Durrës and then Filippo Grimani from Durrës to Brindisi on 22 September.

On 25 September 1940 Angelo Bassini escorted the steamers Nita, Oreste, and Premuda, carrying a combined load of 395 cattle, 1,079 draft animals, and 1,326 tonnes (1,305 long tons; 1,462 short tons) of supplies, from Bari, Italy, to Durrës, while on 29 September she again escorted Filippo Grimani from Brindisi to Durrës and then Piero Foscari from Durrës to Brindisi. On 30 September she escorted Piero Foscari from Brindisi to Durrës. She got back underway from Durrës the same day to escort Filippo Grimani to Brindisi, but the two ships encountered very heavy seas that forced them to return to Durrës. After the weather improved, the two ships made their voyage to Brindisi on 1 October. Maritrafalba was disbanded on 12 October 1940 but reconstituted on 21 October, and Angelo Bassini again was placed under its control along with the two elderly destroyers, nine other torpedo boats, four auxiliary cruisers, and the 13th MAS Squadron for convoy escort and antisubmarine patrol duty.

===== Greco-Italian War =====
Angelo Bassini then was assigned temporarily to the Forza Navale Speciale (Special Naval Force). Tasked with occupying Corfu, the force, commanded by Ammiraglio di squadra (Squadron Admiral) Vittorio Tur, also included the light cruiser Bari (Tur's flagship), the light cruiser Taranto, the destroyers Augusto Riboty and Carlo Mirabello, the torpedo boats Altair, Andromeda, Antares, Aretusa, Giacomo Medici, and Nicola Fabrizi, and the tankers Garigliano, Sesia, and Tirso. Plans called for merchant ships to land the Italian Royal Army's 47th Infantry Division "Bari" and a battalion of the Regia Marina′s Regiment "San Marco" on Corfu on 28 October 1940 — the day the Greco–Italian War broke out with Italy's invasion of Greece — but the amphibious landing was postponed due to rough seas, first to 30 October, then to 31 October, and then again to 2 November before it was cancelled because of the disappointing performance of Italian forces on the Greek front. The 47th Infantry Division "Bari" was reassigned to operations on the front in Epirus, and the merchant ships proceeded to Vlorë to disembark the division there.

Angelo Bassini resumed escort service on the Albanian shipping routes on 22 November 1940, when she left Brindisi at 06:30 as escort to the steamer Rialto, carrying civilian cargo, arriving at Vlorë at 12:00. She diverted from escort duty on 28 November when she participated along with the torpedo boat General Marcello Prestinari and the destroyers of the 15th Destroyer Squadron (Antonio Pigafetta, Augusto Riboty, Emanuele Pessagno, and Nicoloso da Recco) in a bombardment of Greek positions on the northeastern coast of Corfu. During the action, the Italian ships fired over 1,600 120-millimetre (4.7 in) and 102-millimetre (4 in) rounds.

On 1 December 1940 Angelo Bassini left Vlorë at 10:30 headed for Brindisi, escorting two merchant ships — the mixed motor vessel Città di Trapani and the cargo steamer Tagliamento, both in ballast — with which she arrived at Brindisi at 19:10. On 5 December, she departed Bari with the auxiliary cruiser Francesco Morosini, escorting the steamers Firenze and Milano and the motor ship Città di Marsala — carrying 2,674 soldiers and 301.5 tonnes (296.7 long tons; 332.3 short tons) of supplies — to Durrës. On 9 December at 01:10, she got underway from Durrës to escort Città di Marsala, Firenze, and Milano, which returned in ballast to Bari, where they arrived at 17:30. At 20:00 on 15 December Angelo Bassini and Francesco Morosini left Bari escorting Città di Marsala and the steamers Tergestea and Zena, transporting a combined 861 soldiers, 198 draft animals, and 504 motor vehicles, to Durrës, where they arrived at 13:35.

At 18:25 on 18 December 1940, Angelo Bassini left Durrës bound for Bari, escorting Zena and the steamer Romagna, both in ballast, arriving at 10:40 on 19 December. On 20 December at 15:00, Angelo Bassini left Bari escorting the steamers Carnia, Giuseppe Dormio, Miseno, and Pontinia — all carrying civilian cargo — for Durrës, where the ships arrived at 06:00 on 21 December. Angelo Bassini got back underway at 05:30 on 24 December, departing Durrës to escort the steamers Aventino and Vesta, both in ballast, to Bari, which they reached at 20:30.

At 03:00 on 26 December 1940 Angelo Bassini left Bari with the auxiliary cruiser Capitano A. Cecchi to escort Milano, the steamer Galilea, and the motor ships Puccini and Verdi, with 3,433 soldiers, 157 draft animals, and 608.5 tonnes (598.9 long tons; 670.8 short tons) of supplies on board, to Durrës. The destroyers Baleno, Folgore, and Fulmine operated in distant support of the convoy, which arrived at 16:00. On 27 December at 18:30, Angelo Bassini set off from Durrës escorting Milano, Puccini, and Verdi, all in ballast, arriving at Bari at 09:45 on 28 December. At 20:00 on 29 December she left Bari escorting the steamers Nita and Sant'Agata — which had a combined 103 men, 716 draft animals, 105 motor vehicles, and 28.5 tonnes (28.0 long tons; 31.4 short tons) of supplies on board — arriving in Durrës at 11:40 on 30 December. At 17:45 on 30 December, she departed Durrës escorting Aventino, the motor ship Donizetti, and the steamer Quirinale, arriving at Bari at 07:40 on 31 December 1940.

==== 1941 ====
===== Greco-Italian War =====
On 1 January 1941 at 02:00, Angelo Bassini left Bari with the auxiliary cruiser Barletta to escort Aventino, Quirinale, and the motor ship Città di Savona — with a combined 2,884 soldiers, 72 draft animals, and 348 tonnes (343 long tons; 384 short tons) of supplies on board — to Durrës. The convoy arrived at 15:50. At 18:00 on 2 January she left Durrës escorting Aventino, Città di Savona, and Quirinale as they returned in ballast to Bari, where they arrived at 10:00 on 3 January. On 24 January she escorted the steamers Brunner and Scarpanto, carrying a combined 192 tonnes (189 long tons; 212 short tons) of fuel and 397 tonnes (391 long tons; 438 short tons) of artillery, ammunition, provisions, and other supplies, and the military tanker Prometeo, loaded with fuel oil destined for the Regia Marina, from Brindisi to Durrës. On 25 January at 09:30 Angelo Bassini got underway from Durrës escorting the steamer Argentina, in ballast, and the steamer Merano, in postal service, with which she arrived at Brindisi at 17:20, while on 26 January at 23:00, she left Brindisi escorting the steamers Aprilia, Lido, Luciano, and Polcevera, which transported gasoline (petrol), ammunition, fodder, and other supplies to Vlorë, where they arrived at 10:30 on 27 January. On the same day at 17:30, Angelo Bassini left Vlorë escorting the steamers Absirtea and Arpione and the steam tanker Conte di Misurata, all in ballast, arriving at Brindisi at 08:00 on 28 January. On 30 January Angelo Bassini, Nicola Fabrizi, and the auxiliary cruiser Brindisi left Brindisi at 02:00 to escort Argentina and Città di Marsala — carrying a combined 1,230 men, 12 motor vehicles, and 234 tonnes (230 long tons; 258 short tons) of artillery pieces, clothing, ammunition, military supplies, and other supplies — to Vlorë, where they arrived at 09:30.

On 12 February 1941 at 00:15, Angelo Bassini left Brindisi with the tug Portofino to escort the steamers Carmela, Luana, and Neghelli — carrying a combined 1,309 tonnes (1,288 long tons; 1,443 short tons) of ammunition, gasoline (petrol), and other fuels — and Anna Capano, Anna Zippitelli, and Magliulo — all with civilian cargo — to Durrës, which the convoy reached at 13:00. At 06:00 on 22 February, Angelo Bassini left Durrës escorting the postal steamer Merano, with which she arrived at Brindisi at 15:15. At 22:00 on 23 February, Angelo Bassini and the auxiliary cruiser Brioni departed Bari to escort Aventino, Milano, Narenta, and Rossini, which were carrying 2,827 soldiers, 174 draft animals, and 731 tonnes (719 long tons; 806 short tons) of supplies, to Durrës, where they arrived at 09:25 on 24 February. On 26 February at 03:45, Angelo Bassini set off from Durrës escorting Aventino, Milano, and Rossini, all in ballast, on a voyage to Bari, where the ships arrived at 15:15.

On 1 March 1941, Angelo Bassini and Francesco Morosini got underway from Bari at 22:30 to escort Città di Marsala, Rossini, Zena, and the steamers Diana and Titania, which were carrying a total of 1,285 men, 1,676 draft animals, and 443 tonnes (436 long tons; 488 short tons) of ammunition and other supplies, to Durrës, which they reached at 14:45 on 2 March. On 3 March at 00:30, she left Durrës to escort the steamers Mameli and Sant'Agata, both in ballast, to Bari, where they arrived at 15:00. Angelo Bassini left Bari at 20:00 on 4 March with Brioni, escorting Puccini, Quirinale, and the motor ships Città di Agrigento and Città di Tripoli, with 3,126 men, 2.5 tonnes (2.5 long tons; 2.8 short tons) of forage, and 554 tonnes (545 long tons; 611 short tons) of other supplies. The convoy arrived at Durrës at 12:00 on 5 March. On 6 March at 10:30, Angelo Bassini left Durrës escorting Città di Tripoli and Quirinale, carrying a combined 316 wounded, and Puccini, in ballast, arriving at Bari at 22:45. At 16:00 on 9 March Angelo Bassini and Brioni got underway from Bari to escort Città di Tripoli, Puccini, Quirinale, and the motor ship Riv to Durrës, where they arrived at 17:30 to disembark 2,252 soldiers and unload 145 motor vehicles and 1,432 tonnes (1,409 long tons; 1,579 short tons). On 11 March 1941 at 04:00 Angelo Bassini departed Durrës escorting Città di Tripoli, with 207 wounded on board, and Puccini and Quirinale, both in ballast, back to Bari, where they arrived at 12:00.

At 01:40 on 14 March 1941 Angelo Bassini got underway from Bari with Capitano A. Cecchi, escorting Aventino, Filippo Grimani, Milano, Quirinale, and Rissoni — transporting the first echelon of the Royal Army's 56th Infantry Division "Casale", made up of 3,749 soldiers, 123 draft animals, 1,351 tonnes (1,330 long tons; 1,489 short tons) of provisions, and 605 tonnes (595 long tons; 667 short tons) of other supplies — to Durrës. On 15 March at 12:00, Angelo Bassini departed from Durrës escorting Aventino, with 228 wounded on board, and the motor ships Burmania, Narenta, and Rossini, all in ballast, arriving at Bari at 01:30 on 16 March. On 18 March Angelo Bassini and Brioni left Bari at 00:00, escorting Aventino, Puccni, Quirinale, and Rossini, — carrying a combined 3,703 soldiers, 98 draft animals, and 537 tonnes (529 long tons; 592 short tons) of supplies — to Durrës, where they arrived at 12:00. On 19 March at 17:00, Angelo Bassini left Durrës escorting Quirinale, with 384 lightly wounded aboard, and Aventino, Filippo Grimani, and Puccini, all in ballast, to Bari, arriving there at 07:00 on 20 March That same day, Angelo Bassini and Capitano A. Cecchi escorted Aventino, Puccini, Rossini, and Sant'Agata, loaded with 2,808 men, 833 draft animals, and 458 tonnes (451 long tons; 505 short tons) of supplies, from Bari to Durrës.

On 22 March 1941 at 09:30, Angelo Bassini left Durrës escorting Puccini, Rossini and the steamer Istria, all in ballast, to Bari, which they reached at 20:30. On 23 March at 20:00, she left Bari with the auxiliary cruiser Brindisi and escorted Città di Tripoli, Donizetti, Puccini, and the motor ship Barbarigo, with a total of 2,390 soldiers, 158 motor vehicles, and 1,270 tonnes (1,250 long tons; 1,400 short tons) of supplies aboard, to Durrës, where they arrived at 08:35 on 24 March. She then left Durrës at 19:15 on 24 March, escorting Città di Tripoli, with 162 lightly wounded aboard, and Milano, Narenta, and the steamer Monstella, all in ballast, arriving at Bari at 08:30 on 25 March. On 26 March at 18:00, Angelo Bassini got underway from Bari as escort to Istria, Zena, and the steamer Sagitta — with a combined 66 soldiers, 600 draft animals, 28 motor vehicles, and 5,938 tonnes (5,844 long tons; 6,546 short tons) of supplies on board — and the steamer Marco, carrying civilian cargo. The ships arrived at Durrës at 08:50 on 27 March. On 28 March at 07:00, Angelo Bassini departed Durrës bound for Bari, escorting Città di Marsala and the motor ship Città di Alessandria, with 250 wounded on board. The convoy arrived at 20:00. At 20:00 on 29 March she got underway from Bari with Capitano A. Cecchi, escorting Aventino, Puccini, Quirinale, and Rossini to Durrës, where they arrived at 08:45 on 30 March to disembark 3,408 soldiers and 65 draft animals and unload 371 tonnes (365 long tons; 409 short tons). On 31 March at 06:30, Angelo Bassini left Durrës escorting Puccini, in ballast, and Quirinale, with 286 lightly wounded aboard on a voyage to Bari, where the convoy arrived at 19:00.

Germany began a decisive intervention in the Greco–Italian War on 6 April 1941. The Kingdom of Greece surrendered to Germany on 20 April 1941 and to Italy on 23 April, bringing the war to an end.

===== April–December =====
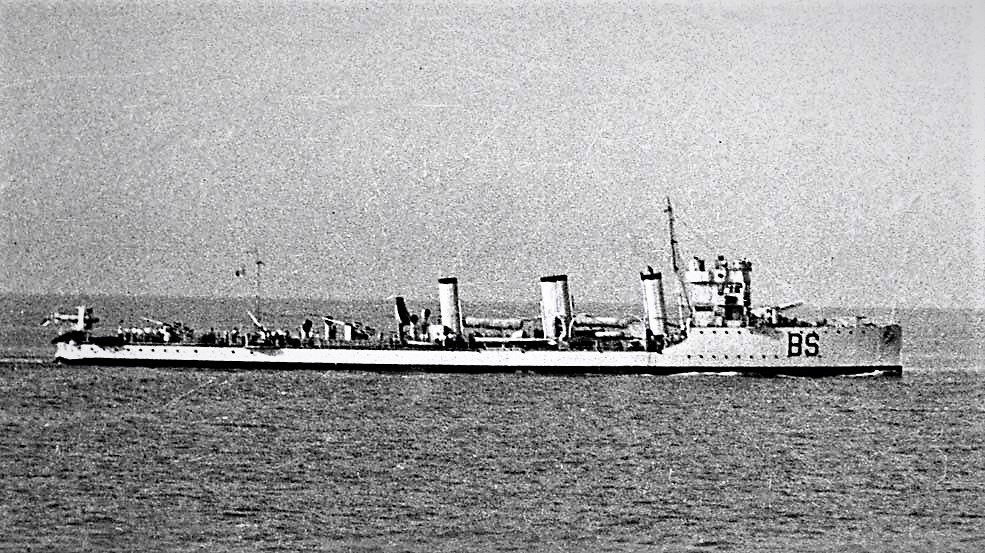
Angelo Bassinii on 2 August 1941.

At some time in 1941 or 1942 Angelo Bassinii underwent modification which saw the removal of two 102-millimetre (4 in) guns and two 450-millimetre (17.7 in) torpedo tubes, and the replacement of her 76-millimetre (3 in) guns with six 20-millimetre autocannons.

On 21 September 1941 Angelo Bassini and Brindisi escorted Aventino and the steamers Italia and Rosandra, with personnel, motor vehicles, and materiel of the Royal Army on board, from Bari via Kotor (known to the Italians as Cattaro) to Durrës. On 24 September the two ships again escorted Aventino, Italia, and Rosandra as they made a voyage from Durrës to Bari carrying 3,500 soldiers returning to Italy. On 25 September Angelo Bassini escorted Tagliamento and the steamer Fanny Brunner from Brindisi to Patras, Greece. On 29 September she escorted the tanker Utilitas on a voyage from Patras to Brindisi. On 22 October Angelo Bassini and the auxiliary cruiser Attilio Deffenu escorted the steamers Francesco Crispi and Piemonte and the motor ship Viminale, loaded with troops and supplies, from Bari to Patras. On 31 October Angelo Bassini escorted Città di Marsala and the steamer Volodda, carrying soldiers returning to Italy, from Patras to Brindisi.

==== 1942 ====
===== January–April =====
On 7 January 1942 Angelo Bassini and Brioni escorted Aventino, Quirinale, and Rosandra as they transported soldiers returning to Italy from Durrës to Bari. On 19 January Angelo Bassini and the auxiliary cruiser Città di Napoli escorted the steamer Città di Catania, with troops and supplies aboard, from Bari to Durrës, and later the same day Angelo Bassini alone escorted the tanker Cassala from Bari to Durrës. On 22 January Angelo Bassini and Città di Napoli again escorted Città di Catania from Bari to Durrës, and on 24 January they escorted Città di Catania on the return voyage to Bari.

On 11 February 1942 Angelo Bassini and Brindisi got underway from Bari to escort Francesco Crispi, Milano, and Piemonte via Corfu to Patras with a load of troops and materials. On 13 February, Angelo Bassini, Brindisi, and the destroyer Turbine escorted the three same merchant ships, loaded with troops and supplies, from Corfu to Patras. On 14 February Angelo Bassini and the auxiliary cruiser Egitto escorted the German steamer Bellona and the Romanian tanker Balkan from Patras to Corfu, and on 15 February they escorted the two merchant ships from Corfu to Brindisi. On 25 February Angelo Bassini and Brindisi escorted the steamers Abbazia, which was on a voyage from Vlorë, and Pozzuoli from Brindisi to Corfu with a load of grain and other materials. On 4 March 1942, Angelo Bassini and Brindisi escorted Abbazia and Pozzuoli from Corfu to Patras. On 15 March, Angelo Bassini and Città di Napoli escorted the tanker Celeno and the steamer Polcevera from Brindisi to Patras.

At 13:00 on 28 March 1942 Angelo Bassini, Città di Napoli, the destroyer Sebenico, and the torpedo boats Antonio Mosto, Castelfidardo, and San Martino, got underway from Patras to escort a convoy composed of Aventino, Francesco Crispi, Galilea, Italia, Piemonte, and Viminale, headed to Brindisi and then on to Bari loaded with 8,300 troops. Francesco Crispi, Galilea, Piemonte, and Viminale were transporting elements of the 3rd Alpine Division "Julia" returning to Italy from Greece, while Aventino and Italia were carrying men from the garrisons of the Italian Dodecanese headed home on leave. After passing Lefkada (known to the Italians as Capo Dukato), the convoy arranged itself in a double column, with Viminale leading the port column, followed by Piemonte and then Aventino, while Galilea led the starboard column with Francesco Cripsi astern of her and Italia bringing up the rear. The escorts arranged themselves around the troopships, with Città di Napoli, (flagship of both the escort ships and the convoy as a whole) ahead, Angelo Bassini in the rear, San Martino and Castelfidardo on the port side, and Antonio Mosto and Sebenico to starboard, with the escorts zigzagging as they convoy proceeded. At 22:45 that day the British submarine HMS Proteus torpedoed Galilea in the Ionian Sea 9 nautical miles (17 km; 10 mi) southwest of Antipaxos. Hit on her port bow, Galilea veered to port, lost speed, and went dead in the water 10 minutes after the torpedo hit her. As ordered before departure from Patras, the rest of the convoy continued its voyage, leaving only Antonio Mosto behind to assist the stricken ship. Galilea sank at 03:50 on 29 March at 39°04′N 020°05′E with the loss of either 991 or 995 lives, according to different sources. Only 284 men survived. The rest of the convoy arrived safely at Bari on 29 March.

On 3 April 1942 Angelo Bassini escorted the tanker Dora C. from Vlorë to Bari. On 7 April she departed Bari with Brioni, Giacomo Medici, and the destroyer Euro to escort Aventino, Italia, Titania and the steamer Ogaden to Durrës, but she collided with Aventino, and the two ships had to return to Bari.

===== October–November =====
On 2 October 1942 Angelo Bassini and Augusto Riboty escorted the tanker Devoli from Patras to Pylos (known to the Italians as Navarino), Greece. On 4 October the two ships escorted the motor vessel Calino on a voyage from Patras to Bari. On 5 October, Angelo Bassini escorted the Italian steamer Chisone and the German steaer H. Harp from Patras to Brindisi.

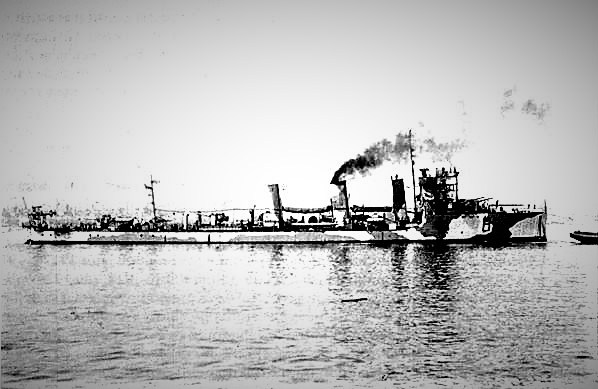
Angelo Bassini painted in a camouflage pattern sometime in 1942 or 1943

On 8 October 1942, Angelo Bassini left Brindisi under the command of Tenente di vascello (Ship-of-the-Line Lieutenant) Vaccarezza to escort the military cargo ship Enrichetta on a voyage to Pylos, loaded with fuel in drums and other supplies for the Greek bases of the Regia Marina. On 10 October, the ships were in mist, rain showers, high winds, and rough seas in the Ionian Sea with Angelo Bassini zigzagging on Enrichetta′s bow, alternating from one side of the steamer to the other, when Enrichetta turned onto a course of 158° at 09:40.Enrichetta was still on a course of 158° and proceeding at 7 knots (13 km/h; 8.1 mph) off Proti Island when Angelo Bassini lost sight of her at 13:30 while about 1,000 metres (1,100 yd) ahead and to starboard of her during a heavy thunderstorm with a north-northeasterly wind that reduced visibility to 300 metres (330 yd). Angelo Bassini ceased zigzagging and also set a course of 158°, and Vaccarezza temporarily suspended monitoring of the radio due to electrical interference by lightning. When the rain gradually slackened and visibility increased at 14:10, Angelo Bassini resumed zigzagging, but Enrichetta was nowhere to be seen, so Angelo Bassini steered toward a position where she assumed she would sight Enrichetta. By 14:20, with Angelo Bassini 5 nautical miles (9.3 km; 5.8 mi) by 326° from Proti Island, visibility had increased to 2 nautical miles (3.7 km; 2.3 mi), but there still was no sign of Enrichetta, so at 14:25 Angelo Bassini reversed course and increased speed to 18 knots (33 km/h; 21 mph). At 14:50 she sighted several buoys 1.5 nautical miles (2.8 km; 1.7 mi) to starboard, maneuvered to get closer, found several people in the water clinging to floating barrels and wreckage, and then discovered wreckage, several hundred fuel drums, half a dozen buoys, and about 50 block torpedoes scattered across an area about 1,000 metres (1,100 yd) in diameter. At 15:30 she lowered her jolly boat and two smaller boats to rescue the people in the water — a difficult operation in the rough seas — and the first survivors came aboard Angelo Bassini at around 16:00. They reported that a British submarine, later identified as HMS P43 (later renamed HMS Union), had hit Enrichetta with three torpedoes, detonating her cargo of fuel drums, and that she sank at 37°11′N 021°26′E about 30 seconds after the drums exploded. Two Italian Regia Aeronautica (Royal Air Force) Macchi fighter aircraft flew over the scene of the rescue operation, which concluded at 17:30. Finding herself unable to transmit a report of the sinking because of interference with radio traffic by bad weather, Angelo Bassini hoisted her boats back aboard at 17:45 and began a search of the area for additional survivors. Finding none, she headed at full speed for Pylos at 17:54, encountering along the way two patrol boats and a tug headed from Pylos toward the scene of the sinking. She arrived at Pylos at 19:10. Of the 151 men on board Enrichetta, 61 disappeared at sea, while Angelo Bassini rescued 78, of whom 18 were injured. Two of the injured died after reaching port, bringing the final death toll to 63.

On 21 October 1942 Angelo Bassini escorted the steamer Cesco and the tanker Devoli from Preveza, Greece, to Vlorë and then to Brindisi. On 26 October she escorted Cesco from Bari to Vlorë. On 29 October she escorted the military transport Pluto and the merchant steamer Volodda from Brindisi to Patras.

On 6 November 1942 Angelo Bassini left Taranto with Antonio Mosto and the torpedo boat Castore to escort the tanker Giorgio to Patras, from which Giorgio continued to Souda, Crete, under the escort of Castore alone. On 15 November Angelo Bassini escorted the tanker Berbera, which was towing the tug Teseo, from Patras to Vlorë. On 25 November Angelo Bassini escorted the modern cargo ship Valfiorita from Corfu to Taranto.

==== 1943 ====
On 7 January 1943 Angelo Bassini and the auxiliary cruiser Città di Genova escorted Milano as Milano transported troops and supplies from Bari to Durrës. On 11 January the two ships escorted Rosandra as she carried troops returning to Italy from Durrës to Bari. On 11 February, Angelo Bassini left Bari at 18:00 escorting a convoy which arrived at Corfu at 10:00 on 12 February. She left Corfu at 22:00 the same day, arriving at Patras at 15:00 on 13 February.

Later in February 1943 Angelo Bassini, like many other Italian and German torpedo boats and escort ships, was used for the rapid transportation of troops and supplies to Tunisia, where the broader North African campaign was culminating in the Tunisian campaign. On 12 March 1943 Angelo Bassini, the auxiliary cruiser Lazzaro Mocenigo, and the torpedo boat Giuseppe Missori escorted Milano and Quirinale from Bari to Durrës.

At 00:00 on 23 April 1943 Angelo Bassini got underway from Messina, Sicily, to join the corvettes Euterpe and Gabbiano and the torpedo boat Climene in escorting the steamer Galiola, which was making a voyage from Reggio Calabria to Tunis loaded with ammunition. As the convoy steamed along the north coast of Sicily at 06:05 Italian time (04:50 British time) on 24 April, the British submarine HMS Sahib torpedoed Galiola between Vulcano and Sicily, and Galiola blew up, broke in two, and sank in three minutes 5 nautical miles (9.3 km; 5.8 mi) northwest of Milazzo. While the torpedo boats rescued survivors, a German Luftwaffe Junkers Ju 88 bomber sighted Sahib near the surface and dropped a bomb, which missed. Climene almost immediately detected Sahib on sonar and counterattacked, followed by the two corvettes. The three ships dropped a combined 30 depth charges. Severely damaged by the depth charges and leaking badly, Sahib surfaced at 07:00 Italian time (05:45am British time). The Ju 88 strafed Sahib and the escort ships opened machine gun fire on her. After taking measures to scuttle their submarine, Sahib′s entire crew of 48 men abandoned ship. Also hit by gunfire from Climene, Sahib sank by the stern shortly afterwards in the Tyrrhenian Sea at 38°30′N 015°15′E, 2 nautical miles (3.7 km; 2.3 mi) from Capo di Milazzo. The Italian ships rescued Sahib′s entire crew, one of whom later died of his wounds.

==== Loss ====
On 28 May 1943 Angelo Bassini was moored at Leghorn (Livorno) when 92 United States Army Air Forces bombers attacked, extensively damaging the city and its port and killing 294 civilians. The bombers sank numerous ships in the harbor including Angelo Bassini, which suffered a devastating bomb hit, capsized, and sank. All of her crew survived.

Angelo Bassini was stricken from the naval register on 18 October 1946. Her wreck was refloated in 1946 and subsequently scrapped.
