= Italian destroyer Giacinto Carini =

Italian La Masa-class destroyer

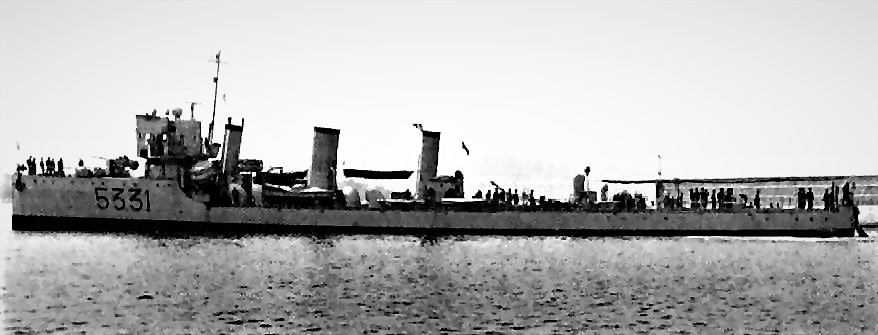
- Giacinto Carini as a minesweeper in the 1950s.

History

Kingdom of Italy
- Name: Giacinto Carini
- Namesake: Giacinto Carini (1821–1880), Italian patriot and politician
- Builder: Cantieri navali Odero, Sestri Ponente, Kingdom of Italy
- Laid down: 1 September 1916
- Launched: 7 November 1917
- Completed: 28 September 1917
- Commissioned: 30 November 1917
- Reclassified: Torpedo boat 1929
- Identification: Pennant number CA, CR (1917–1954)
- Motto: Fide fidentia (Trust in Faith)
- Fate: To Italian Republic 1946

Italian Republic
- Reclassified: Coastal minesweeper 1953
- Stricken: 31 December 1958
- Identification: Pennant number M 5331 (1954–1958)
- Renamed: GM 517
- Reclassified: Pontoon
- Fate: Scrapping began May 1963
- Notes: GM 517 served as a training hulk

General characteristics (as built)
- Type: Destroyer
- Displacement: 785 long tons (798 t) (standard); 851 long tons (865 t) (full load)
- Length: 72.5 m (237 ft 10 in) (waterline)
- Beam: 7.3 m (23 ft 11 in)
- Draught: 2.8 m (9 ft 2 in)
- Installed power: 15,500 shp (11,558 kW); maximum 17,000 shp (12,677 kW)
- Propulsion: 2 × Tosi steam turbines; 4 × Thornycroft boilers
- Speed: 33.6 knots (62.2 km/h; 38.7 mph)
- Range: 2,230 nmi (4,130 km; 2,570 mi) at 12.5 knots (23.2 km/h; 14.4 mph); 410 nmi (759 km; 472 mi) at 28.5 knots (52.8 km/h; 32.8 mph)
- Complement: 4 officers, 74 non-commissioned officers and sailors
- Armament: As built: 4 × 102 mm (4 in)/45 guns; 2 × 76.2 mm (3 in)/40 AA; 4 × 450 mm (18 in) torpedo tubes; 10 mines

Giacinto Carini was an Italian La Masa-class destroyer. Commissioned into service in the Italian Regia Marina ("Royal Navy") in 1917, she served in World War I, participating in the Adriatic campaign. During the interwar period, she took part in operations during the Corfu incident in 1923 and was reclassified as a torpedo boat in 1929. She took part in the Mediterranean campaign of World War II. After the fall of Fascist Italy and the Italian armistice with the Allies in 1943, she switched to the Allied side and operated as a unit of the Italian Co-belligerent Navy until 1945. A part of the Italian Navy (Marina Militare) after the Italian Republic replaced the Kingdom of Italy in 1946, she remained in service during the Cold War and was reclassified as a coastal minesweeper in 1953. Stricken in 1958, she subsequently served as the training hulk GM 517 until scrapped in 1963.

== Construction and commissioning ==
Giacinto Carini was laid down at the Cantieri navali Odero (English: Odero Shipyard) in Sestri Ponente, Italy, on 1 September 1916. She was launched on 7 November 1917 and completed and commissioned on 30 November 1917.

== Service history ==
=== World War I ===
Giacinto Carini entered service in time to take part in the final year of World War I. She was assigned to the 4th Destroyer Squadron at Brindisi, Italy, and saw service in the Adriatic campaign.

On 10 March 1918, the destroyers Antonio Mosto, with the motor torpedo boat MAS 100 in tow, and Ippolito Nievo, towing MAS 99, set out for a raid on Portorož (known to the Italians as Portorose) on the coast of Austria-Hungary, with Giacinto Carini, the scout cruisers Alessandro Poerio, Augusto Riboty, Carlo Mirabello, and Cesare Rossarol, the destroyer Pilade Bronzetti, and a French Navy destroyer squadron led by the destroyer Casque in support. Antonio Mosto, Ippolito Nievo, MAS 99, and MAS 100 reached the vicinity of Portorož, but then had to postpone the operation due to bad weather. The ships attempted the raid again on 16 March, but adverse weather again forced its postponement. They made a third attempt on 8 April 1918, but after aerial reconnaissance ascertained that the port of Portorož was empty, the Italians again called off the operation.

On the night of 9–10 April 1918 Giacinto Carini was part of a force of several Italian and French Navy destroyers escorting the three battleships of the Italian 2nd Naval Division from Brindisi to Taranto, Italy. During the predawn hours of 10 April, two of the French destroyers, Faulx and Mangini, collided in the Strait of Otranto and Faulx sank. About an hour later, after the ships entered the Ionian Sea, Giacinto Carini accidentally rammed her sister ship Benedetto Cairoli, and Benedetto Cairoli sank off Santa Maria di Leuca, Italy. With a severely damaged bow, Giacinto Carini reached port.

Giacinto Carini was under repair for the rest of World War I. By late October 1918, Austria-Hungary had effectively disintegrated, and the Armistice of Villa Giusti, signed on 3 November 1918, went into effect on 4 November 1918 and brought hostilities between Austria-Hungary and the Allies to an end. World War I ended a week later with the armistice between the Allies and the German Empire on 11 November 1918.

=== Interwar period ===
Giacinto Carini saw extensive service in the Mediterranean Sea and Red Sea during the interwar period. During the Corfu incident between Italy and the Kingdom of Greece, a force composed of Giacinto Carini, the battleships Conte di Cavour and Giulio Cesare, the armored cruisers San Giorgio and San Marco, the destroyers Generale Antonio Cascino, Generale Carlo Montanari, Giacomo Medici, and Giuseppe La Farina, the torpedo boat Premuda, the coastal torpedo boats 50 OS and 53 AS, the motor torpedo boats MAS 401, MAS 404, MAS 406, and MAS 408, and the submarines Agostino Barbarigo and Andrea Provana departed Taranto, Italy, on the evening of 30 August 1923 bound for Corfu with orders to occupy the island. The Italian ships arrived off Corfu on 31 August and communicated to the Greek governor of the island the conditions of surrender, which required lowering of the Greek flag and raising the Italian flag over the island, disarming all Greek soldiers and gendarmes, ceasing all communications, and ceding control of all activities on the island to Italian authorities. Not receiving a satisfactory answer to these damands, the Italian ships opened fire at 16:00, bombarding the Old Fortress and the New Fortress for 15 minutes. Refugees had taken shelter there, and the Italian bombardment killed 10 of them and injured several others. The Greek governor then surrendered and the Italian expeditionary force — made up of sailors from the Italian ships, the Italian Royal Army's 48th Infantry Regiment "Ferrara" (equipped with a battery of eight 75 mm guns), and an infantry brigade of 5,000 men — landed on Corfu. Most of the ships then returned to Taranto, but Giacinto Carini and the other four destroyers as well as one of the armored cruisers, the submarines, and the MAS boats remained at Corfu. Once Italy and Greece resolved their disagreement, the rest of the Italian ships and the expeditionary force on the island left Corfu between 24 and 29 September 1923.

Capitano di corvetta (Corvette Captain) Carlo Bergamini, a future admiral and commander of the Italian fleet, was Giacinto Carini′s commanding officer from 28 June to 23 December 1926. In 1929, Giacinto Carini and her sister ships Angelo Bassini, Giuseppe La Farina, and Nicola Fabrizi formed the 5th Destroyer Squadron, which together with the five-ship 6th Destroyer Squadron and the scout cruiser Carlo Mirabello constituted the 3rd Flotilla of the 2nd Torpedo Boat Division, a component of the 2nd Squadron, based at Taranto, Italy. Giacinto Carini was reclassified as a torpedo boat in 1929.

Bergamini, by then a capitano di fregata (frigate captain), again served as Giacinto Carini′s commanding officer from 16 July 1931 to 24 March 1932, and during this second tour in command tested a fire-control system, the "Galileo–Bergamini" system, which he had designed. In the early months of 1940, Capitano di corvetta (Corvette Captain) Lorenzo Bezzi commanded her. Later that year, shortly after Italy entered World War II, Bezzi died while in command of the submarine Console Generale Liuzzi and subsequently received a posthumous Gold Medal of Military Valor.

=== World War II ===
World War II broke out in September 1939 with Nazi Germany's invasion of Poland. Fascist Italy joined the war on the side of the Axis powers with its invasion of France on 10 June 1940. At the time, Giacinto Carini was based at La Spezia as part of the 16th Torpedo Boat Squadron, which also included the torpedo boats Calatafimi, Castelfidardo, Curtatone, Giuseppe La Masa, and Monzambano. During the war, she mainly operated on escort duty. Between 9 and 15 June 1940 she joined Curtatone and the torpedo boat Sirio in escorting the minelayers Crotone, Elbano Gasperi, Fasana, and Giuseppe Orlando while they laid minefields off Elba.

After 1940 Giacinto Carini underwent a revision of her armament which saw the removal of two 102-millimetre (4 in) guns and two torpedo tubes and the replacement of her 76-millimetre (3 in) guns with six 20-millimetre autocannons. In April 1941, the definitive EC3/ter version of the Gufo radar, which had just been created at the beginning of 1941, was installed aboard her for testing; during the tests, the radar detected a surface target at a range of 12 kilometres (6.5 nautical miles; 7.5 miles) and an aircraft at a range of 8 kilometres (4.3 nautical miles; 5.0 miles).

On 11 November 1942, Giacinto Carini collided in the port of Genoa with the sailing vessel V 208 Araldo, which was operating as a patrol vessel.

On 8 September 1943, the Kingdom of Italy announced an armistice with the Allies and switched sides in the war, prompting Nazi Germany to begin Operation Achse, the disarmament by force of the Italian armed forces and the occupation of those portions of Italy not yet under Allied control. Giacinto Carini avoided capture and proceeded with her sister ship Nicola Fabrizi to Malta, where they handed themselves over to the Allies on 21 September 1943. The two ships departed Malta in company with the torpedo boats Aliseo, Animoso, Fortunale, and Indomito on 5 October 1943 and returned to Italy. Giacinto Carini subsequently operated on the Allied side as a unit of the Italian Co-belligerent Navy through the end of the war in Europe in May 1945.

=== Post-World War II ===
After the Italian Republic replaced the Kingdom of Italy in 1946, Giacinto Carini continued in service in the Italian Navy (Marina Militare). She was reclassified as a minesweeper in 1953. She was stricken on 31 December 1958 and reclassified as a pontoon with the designation GM 517. GM 517 remained in service as a training hulk for the Corpo degli Equipaggi Militari Marittimi (CEMM, "Corps of Naval Crews") at La Maddalena, Sardinia, for a few years until she was sold for scrapping, which began in May 1963.
