= Italian destroyer Benedetto Cairoli =

Italian La Masa-class destroyer

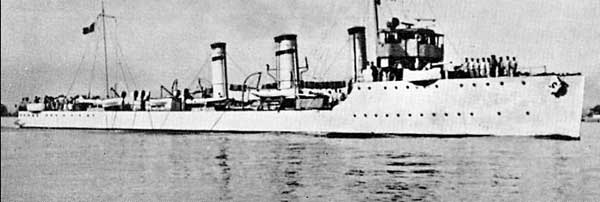

History

Kingdom of Italy
- Name: Benedetto Cairoli
- Namesake: Benedetto Cairoli (1825–1889), Italian patriot, soldier, and politician
- Builder: Cantieri navali Odero, Sestri Ponente, Kingdom of Italy
- Laid down: 1 September 1916
- Launched: 28 December 1917
- Completed: 3 February 1918
- Commissioned: 1918
- Fate: Sunk in collision 10 April 1918

General characteristics
- Type: Destroyer
- Displacement: 785 long tons (798 t) (standard); 851 long tons (865 t) (full load)
- Length: 72.5 m (237 ft 10 in) (waterline)
- Beam: 7.3 m (23 ft 11 in)
- Draught: 2.8 m (9 ft 2 in)
- Installed power: 4 × Thornycroft boilers; 15,500 shp (11,558 kW); maximum 17,000 shp (12,677 kW)
- Propulsion: 2 × Tosi steam turbines
- Speed: 33.6 knots (62.2 km/h; 38.7 mph)
- Range: 2,230 nmi (4,130 km; 2,570 mi) at 12.5 knots (23.2 km/h; 14.4 mph); 410 nmi (759 km; 472 mi) at 28.5 knots (52.8 km/h; 32.8 mph)
- Complement: 4 officers, 74 non-commissioned officers and sailors
- Armament: 4 × 102 mm (4 in)/45 guns; 2 × 76.2 mm (3 in)/40 AA; 4 × 450 mm (18 in) torpedo tubes; 10 mines

Benedetto Cairoli was an Italian La Masa-class destroyer. Commissioned into service in the Italian Regia Marina ("Royal Navy") in 1918. She served in World War I, participating in the Adriatic campaign. Only a little more than two months after entering service, she sank after a collision.

== Construction and commissioning ==
Benedetto Cairoli was laid down at the Cantieri navali Odero (English: Odero Shipyard) in Sestri Ponente, Italy, on 1 September 1916. She was launched on 28 December 1917 and completed and commissioned on 3 February 1918.

== Service history ==
=== World War I ===
Benedetto Cairoli entered service in time to take part in the final year of World War I. She was assigned to the 4th Destroyer Squadron at Brindisi, Italy, and served in the Adriatic campaign.

On the night of 9–10 April 1918 Benedetto Cairoli was part of a force of several Italian and French Navy destroyers escorting the three battleships of the Italian 2nd Naval Division from Brindisi to Taranto, Italy. During the predawn hours of 10 April, two of the French destroyers, Faulx and Mangini, collided in the Strait of Otranto and Faulx sank. About an hour later, after the ships entered the Ionian Sea, Benedetto Cairoli′s sister ship Giacinto Carini accidentally rammed her, and Benedetto Cairoli sank a few hours later off Santa Maria di Leuca, Italy. The Royal Australian Navy destroyer HMAS Torrens rescued her survivors, but one member of Torrens′s crew was swept overboard and drowned in heavy seas during the rescue operation. Meanwhile, Giacinto Carini reached port with a severely damaged bow and remained under repair for the rest of World War I.
