= La Masa-class destroyer =

Italian class of naval destroyer

La Masa Class
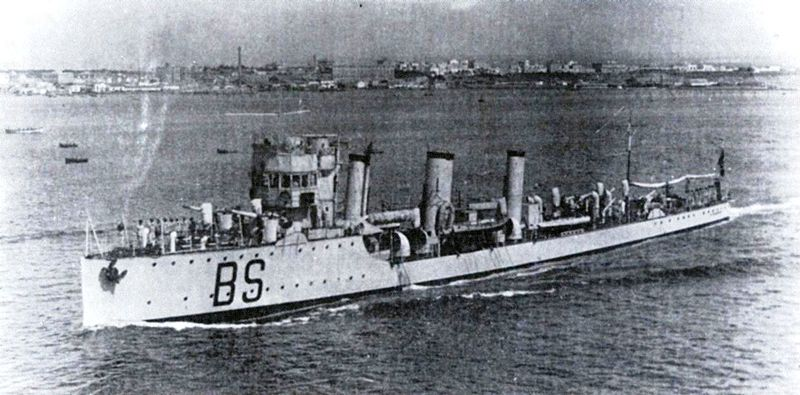
- Angelo Bassini in 1923

Class overview
- Name: La Masa class
- Builders: Cantieri navali Odero, Odero Shipyard,Sestri Ponente
- Operators: Regia Marina; Italian Navy
- Preceded by: Giuseppe Sirtori class
- Succeeded by: Audace-class destroyer
- Built: 1917–1919
- In service: 1917–1958
- Completed: 8
- Lost: 6
- Retired: 2

General characteristics (as built)
- Type: Destroyer
- Displacement: 851 long tons (865 t) (full load); 785 long tons (798 t) (standard)
- Length: 72.5 m (237 ft 10 in) (length at the waterline)
- Beam: 7.3 m (23 ft 11 in)
- Draught: 2.8 m (9 ft 2 in)
- Installed power: 15,500 shp (11,600 kW); max 17,000 shp (13,000 kW)
- Propulsion: 2 × Tosi steam turbines; 4 × Thornycroft boilers
- Speed: 33.6 knots (62.2 km/h; 38.7 mph)
- Range: 2,230 nmi (4,130 km; 2,570 mi) at 12.5 knots (23.2 km/h; 14.4 mph); 410 nmi (760 km; 470 mi) at 28.5 knots (52.8 km/h; 32.8 mph)
- Complement: 4 officers, 74 NCOs and sailors
- Armament: 4 × 102 mm (4 in)/45 guns; 2 × 76.2 mm (3 in)/40 AA; 4 × 450 mm (18 in) torpedo tubes; 10 mines

The La Masa class was a class of eight destroyers of the Italian Regia Marina (Royal Navy) constructed during the First World War, during which one ship was lost in a collision. Like other obsolete Italian destroyers, the seven surviving ships were reclassified as torpedo boats in 1929, and served during Second World War. Two ships were sunk in air attacks while in Italian service during the Second World War, one was sunk by a mine, and two more were scuttled. The remaining two ships survived the war and continued to serve in the post-war Italian Navy (Marina Militare) before being decommissioned in 1957–1958.

== Design and description ==
The La Masa class was developed from the Sirtori class destroyers. Four ships were ordered in 1915, four more in 1916. All eight ships were built by the Odero shipyard in Sestri Ponente near Genoa. Their main armament was provided by four 102 mm (4 in) Schneider-Armstrong 1917 L/45 guns, the two bow ones side by side, the two aft one behind the other on the centre line. These guns were Italian-made licensed copies of the British QF 4in Mk V gun. The secondary armament was provided by two 76.2 mm (3 in) L/40 Ansaldo anti-aircraft guns (in place of the 40 mm (2 in) of the Sirtori-class) and four 6.5 mm (0.26 in) Colt-Browning machine guns. Additionally, the destroyers carried four 450 mm (18 in) torpedo tubes in twin mounts. Also up to ten mines could be deployed. Because of these new and heavy armaments, the main armament was reduced compared to the Sirtori-class from six to four. Because two aft guns were positioned on the center line, the broadside was still made up of three guns.

The ships were 73.5 m (241 ft) long o/a, 7.3 m (24 ft) wide and had 2.8 m (9 ft 2 in) draught. Their displacement was 785 long tons (798 t) standard and 851 long tons (865 t) full load. The machinery consisted of four oil-fired Thornycroft boilers and two Tosi steam turbines that delivered 15,500 shp (11,600 kW). The ships had two shafts. The maximum speed when commissioned was 33.6 knots (62.2 km/h; 38.7 mph) but it had dropped to just 30 knots (56 km/h; 35 mph) at the beginning of World War II. The fuel storage amounted to 150 tons of oil, the range was 2,230 nmi (4,130 km; 2,570 mi) at cruising speed of 12.5 knots (23.2 km/h; 14.4 mph). The ship's complement was 4 officers and 74 ratings.

In 1929 the ships were reclassified as torpedo boats. Their armament was modified after Italy's entry into WW2, mainly in order to strengthen their anti-air capabilities. The modifications differed between ships. Between 1940 and 1942 five of the ships - Angelo Bassini, Enrico Cosenz, Nicola Fabrizi, Giuseppe La Farina, Giacomo Medici - had two or even three of their 102 mm guns and one of their two torpedo tubes removed. Six 20 mm (0.79 in) Breda Model 35 L/65 anti-aircraft guns were installed in their place as well as two depth charge throwers. On Giacinto Carini and Giuseppe La Masa a 533 mm (21 in) triple torpedo tube set was installed behind the third funnel, in addition to the 450 mm twin tube set on the aft deck. Moreover, these two ships had four 20 mm Breda Model 35 anti-aircraft guns installed in twin mounts. After the modifications, the displacement varied between 660 t (650 long tons) standard and 875 t (861 long tons) full load.

The two ships that survived the war, Giacinto Carini and Nicola Fabrizi, were converted into minesweepers in 1953-4 by the Italian Navy. As minesweepers, they retained only one 102 mm gun and three 20 mm AA guns, but were now equipped with radar and mine clearing gear.

== Service ==
The destroyers of the La Masa class, like their predecessors, were used in the Adriatic against the Austro-Hungarian k.u.k. Kriegsmarine. One ship was lost on 10 April 1918, when the Benedetto Cairoli which had only been in service for two months, sank in the Ionian Sea after a collision with her sister ship Giacinto Carini.

When the armistice came into effect at the end of the First World War, two ships of the class, Giuseppe La Masa and Nicola Fabrizi, belonged to a squadron led by Audace, which took Trieste with 200 Carabiniere. On the night of 8 October 1919, Agostino Bertani, which was only completed in June 1919 as the penultimate ship of the class, was taken over by officers in Trieste, who wanted to join Gabriele D'Annunzio in Fiume. They sailed with the destroyer to Fiume. D'Annunzio declared Fiume independent against the wishes of the Italian government. Italy captured Fiume in December 1920 and the ships that defected to D'Annunzio's legionaries returned to the Regia Marina in January 1921, where they were decommissioned. Along with the other defected ships, Bertani was renamed: she was put back into service as Enrico Cosenz. The new namesake Enrico Cosenz (1820–1898) was the first chief of staff of the Italian army.

In 1923, several destroyers of the class were deployed in the Corfu incident with the squadrons off Corfu and in the Dodecanese, which were intended to exert pressure on Greece.

== Ships ==
| Name | Pennant | Builder | Laid down | Launched | Completed | Operational History |
|---|---|---|---|---|---|---|
| Giuseppe La Masa | LM | Odero, Sestri Ponente | 1 September 1916 | 6 September 1917 | 28 September 1917 | Seized by Nazi Germany on 9 September 1943 in Naples, scuttled on 11 September 1943 |
| Giacinto Carini | CA, CR | Odero, Sestri Ponente | 1 September 1916 | 7 November 1917 | 30 November 1917 | Reclassified as minesweeper in 1954, stricken in December 1958 |
| Benedetto Cairoli | | Odero, Sestri Ponente | 1 September 1916 | 28 December 1917 | 3 February 1918 | Sunk on 10 April 1918 in the Ionian Sea after a collision with the sister ship Giacinto Carini |
| Angelo Bassini | BS | Odero, Sestri Ponente | 2 October 1916 | 28 March 1918 | 1 May 1918 | Sunk on 28 May 1943 in Livorno after an American air raid |
| Nicola Fabrizi | FB | Odero, Sestri Ponente | 1 September 1916 | 8 July 1918 | 12 July 1918 | Reclassified as minesweeper in 1954, stricken in February 1957 |
| Giuseppe La Farina | FR, LF | Odero, Sestri Ponente | 29 December 1917 | 12 March 1919 | 18 March 1919 | Sunk on 4 May 1941 after hitting a mine off the Tunisian coast |
| Agostino Bertani (after 1921: Enrico Cosenz) | CS | Odero, Sestri Ponente | 23 December 1917 | 6 June 1919 | 13 June 1919 | Scuttled in the Adriatic near Lastovo on 27 September 1943 after sustaining heavy damage in a German air raid |
| Giacomo Medici | MD | Odero, Sestri Ponente | 2 October 1916 | 6 September 1918 | 13 September 1919 | Sunk in Catania on 16 April 1943 by an American air raid |

== Sources ==
- Fraccaroli, Aldo (1985). "Italy". In Gray, Randal (ed.). Conway's All the World's Fighting Ships 1906–1921. Annapolis: Naval Institute Press. pp. 252–290. ISBN 978-0-87021-907-8.
- Roberts, John (1980). "Italy". In Chesneau, Roger (ed.). Conway's All the World's Fighting Ships 1922–1946. New York: Mayflower Books. pp. 280–317. ISBN 0-8317-0303-2.
- Whitley, M. J. (1988). Destroyers of World War Two: An International Encyclopedia. Annapolis, Maryland: Naval Institute Press. ISBN 0-87021-326-1.
