= Italian destroyer Giuseppe La Masa =

Italian La Masa-class destroyer

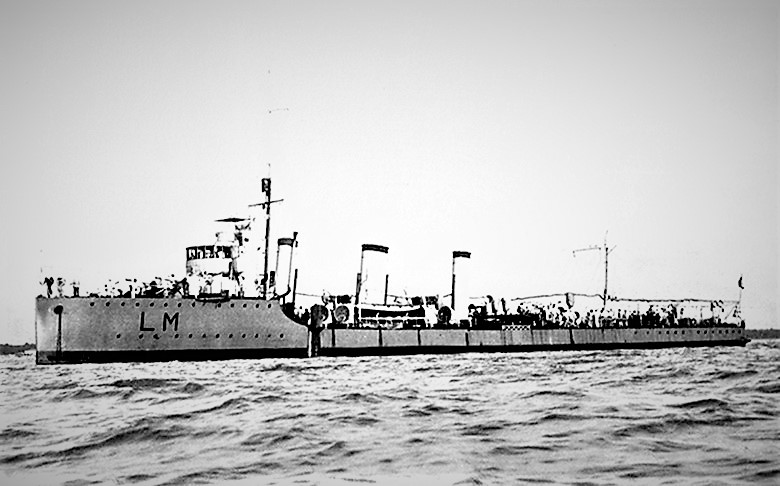
- Giuseppe La Masa in 1923.

History

Kingdom of Italy
- Name: Giuseppe La Masa
- Namesake: Giuseppe La Masa (1819–1881), Italian patriot, politician, and soldier
- Builder: Cantieri navali Odero, Sestri Ponente, Kingdom of Italy
- Laid down: 1 September 1916
- Launched: 6 September 1917
- Completed: 28 September 1917
- Commissioned: 28 September 1917
- Reclassified: Torpedo boat 1 October 1929
- Identification: Pennant number LM
- Motto: Immutata fide (Unchanged Faith)
- Fate: Scuttled 11 September 1943

General characteristics (as built)
- Type: Destroyer
- Displacement: 785 long tons (798 t) (standard); 851 long tons (865 t) (full load)
- Length: 72.5 m (237 ft 10 in) (waterline)
- Beam: 7.3 m (23 ft 11 in)
- Draught: 2.8 m (9 ft 2 in)
- Installed power: 15,500 shp (11,558 kW); maximum 17,000 shp (12,677 kW)
- Propulsion: 2 × Tosi steam turbines; 4 × Thornycroft boilers
- Speed: 33.6 knots (62.2 km/h; 38.7 mph)
- Range: 2,230 nmi (4,130 km; 2,570 mi) at 12.5 knots (23.2 km/h; 14.4 mph); 410 nmi (759 km; 472 mi) at 28.5 knots (52.8 km/h; 32.8 mph)
- Complement: 4 officers, 74 non-commissioned officers and sailors
- Armament: As built: 4 × 102 mm (4 in)/45 guns; 2 × 76.2 mm (3 in)/40 AA; 4 × 450 mm (18 in) torpedo tubes; 10 mines

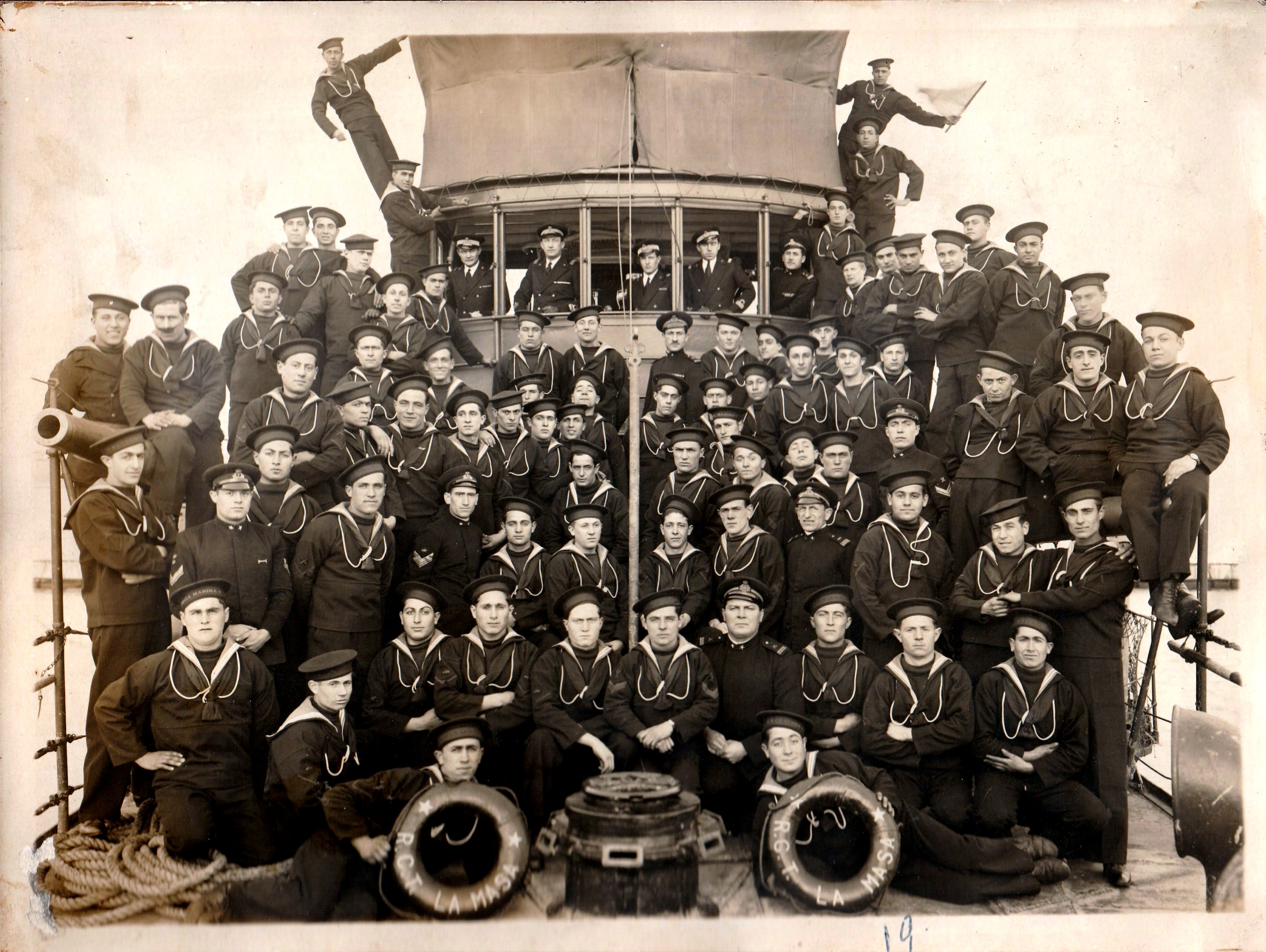
The crew of Giuseppe La Masa in 1919.

Giuseppe La Masa was the lead ship of the Italian La Masa-class destroyers. Commissioned into service in the Italian Regia Marina ("Royal Navy") in 1917, she served in World War I, participating in the Adriatic campaign. She also deployed to protect Italian interests during the Corfu incident in 1923. Reclassified as a torpedo boat in 1929, she took part in the Mediterranean campaign of World War II until the Italian armistice with the Allies in 1943, when her crew scuttled her to prevent her use by the Germans.

== Construction and commissioning ==
Giuseppe La Masa was laid down at the Cantieri navali Odero (English: Odero Shipyard) in Sestri Ponente, Italy, on 1 September 1916. She was launched on 6 September 1917 and completed and commissioned on 28 September 1917.

== Service history ==
=== World War I ===
The first La Masa-class ship to enter service, Giuseppe La Masa took part in the final stages of World War I. On the night of 1–2 July 1918 she joined the destroyers Audace, Francesco Stocco, Giovanni Acerbi, Giuseppe Missori, Giuseppe Sirtori, and Vincenzo Giordano Orsini in providing distant support to a formation consisting of the torpedo boats Climene and Procione and the coastal torpedo boats 15 OS, 18 OS, 48 OS, 3 PN, 40 PN, 64 PN, 65 PN, and 66 PN. While 15 OS, 18 OS, and 3 PN, towing dummy landing pontoons, staged a simulated amphibious landing to distract Austro-Hungarian troops in support of an Italian advance on the Italian front, 48 OS, 40 PN, 64 PN, 65 PN, and 66 PN bombarded the Austro-Hungarian lines between Cortellazzo and Caorle, proceeding at low speed between the two locations, with Climeme and Procione in direct support. Meanwhile, an Austro-Hungarian Navy force consisting of the destroyers Balaton and Csikós and the torpedo boats TB 83F and TB 88F had put to sea from Pola late on the evening of 1 July to support an Austro-Hungarian air raid on Venice. After an Italian MAS motor torpedo boat made an unsuccessful torpedo attack against Balaton, which was operating with a faulty boiler, at first light on 2 July, the Italian and Austro-Hungarian destroyers sighted one another at 03:10 on 2 July. The Italians opened gunfire on the Austro-Hungarians, who returned fire. During the brief exchange of gunfire that followed, Balaton, in a more advanced position, suffered several shell hits on her forward deck, while Giuseppe La Masa, Audace, and Giuseppe Missori fired on Csikós and the two torpedo boats, scoring a hit on Csikós in her aft boiler room and one hit on each of the torpedo boats. On the Italian side, Francesco Stocco suffered damage which set her on fire and killed and injured some of her crew. While Giovanni Acerbi remained behind to assist Francesco Stocco, the Austro-Hungarians withdrew toward Pola and the Italians resumed operations in support of their own torpedo boats.

By late October 1918, Austria-Hungary had effectively disintegrated, and the Armistice of Villa Giusti, signed on 3 November 1918, went into effect on 4 November 1918 and brought hostilities between Austria-Hungary and the Allies to an end. On 3 November, Giuseppe La Masa got underway from Venice with Audace, Giuseppe Missori, and the destroyer Nicola Fabrizi and rendezvoused with the torpedo boats Climene and Procione, which had departed Cortellazzo. The Italian ships then proceeded to Trieste, which they reached at 16:10. The ships disembarked 200 members of the Carabinieri and General Carlo Petitti di Roreto, who proclaimed Italy's annexation of the city to a cheering crowd in a celebration of the unification of Trieste with Italy. On 5 November 1918, Giuseppe La Masa, Giuseppe Missori, the battleship Ammiraglio di Saint Bon, and the destroyers Giuseppe Cesare Abba and Rosolino Pilo entered the port at Pola, after which units embarked on the ships occupied the city over the following days. World War I ended with an armistice between the Allies and the German Empire on 11 November 1918.

=== Interwar period ===
On 20 August 1923, during the Corfu incident, Giuseppe La Masa left Taranto, Italy, with Giuseppe Sirtori, the battleships Duilio and Andrea Doria, the scout cruiser Augusto Riboty, the destroyers Generale Achille Papa, Generale Antonio Cantore, Generale Antonio Chinotto, and Generale Marcello Prestinari, a minesweeper, and two auxiliary ships. The force proceeded to Portolago on the island of Leros in the Aegean Sea, from which it operated to protect the Italian Dodecanese from possible acts of hostility on the part of the Kingdom of Greece. She was reclassified as a torpedo boat on 1 October 1929.

=== World War II ===
World War II broke out in September 1939 with Nazi Germany's invasion of Poland. Italy joined the war on the side of the Axis powers with its invasion of France on 10 June 1940. At the time, Giuseppe La Masa was based at La Spezia as part of the 16th Torpedo Boat Squadron, which also included the torpedo boats Calatafimi, Castelfidardo, Curtatone, Giacinto Carini, and Monzambano. During the war, she mainly operated on escort duty in the Tyrrhenian Sea. After 1940 she underwent a revision of her armament which saw the removal of three 102-millimetre (4 in) guns, the replacement of her 76-millimetre (3 in) guns with eight 20-millimetre autocannons, and the replacement of two of her 450-millimetre (17.7 in) torpedo tubes with three 533-millimetre (21 in) tubes.

On 9 February 1941, the British Royal Navy's Force H carried out Operation Grog, a naval and aerial bombardment of Genoa and La Spezia. At 11:47 Fleet Air Arm aircraft from the British aircraft carrier HMS Ark Royal shot down an Italian Regia Aeronautica (Royal Air Force) 287th Squadron CANT Z.506 Airone reconnaissance floatplane which had sighted Force H before the plane could transmit a message reporting the sighting. Giuseppe La Masa rescued the plane's crew in the Tyrrhenian Sea at around 17:00 and at 17:15 transmitted the plane's sighting — of an aircraft carrier, two battleships, and other ships 45 nautical miles (83 km; 52 mi) bearing 300 degrees from Cap Corse, Corsica, at 43°22′N 008°35′E, heading northwest on a course of 300 to 310 degrees. The plane's report was quite accurate except with regard to the British ships' course, but it was several hours old when Giuseppe La Masa transmitted it for the plane's crew. It did not reach the commander of the Italian fleet, Admiral Angelo Iachino, until 17:55, just under eight hours after the plane's sighting, too late to be useful in any Italian attempt to intercept the British, who returned to Gibraltar without any counterattack by the Regia Marina.

On 8 September 1943, the Kingdom of Italy announced an armistice with the Allies and switched sides in the war, prompting Nazi Germany to begin Operation Achse, the disarmament by force of the Italian armed forces and the occupation of those portions of Italy not yet under Allied control. At the time, Giuseppe La Masa was undergoing overhaul at Naples. She was unable to put to sea, so her crew scuttled her at Naples on 11 September 1943 to prevent her capture by German forces.
