= Bassini =

Bassini is a surname of Italian origin. The name may refer to:

- Achille De Bassini (1819–1881), Italian operatic baritone
- Angelo Bassini (1815–1889), Italian soldier and patriot
- Edoardo Bassini (1844–1924), Italian surgeon; noted for surgical procedure for repairing hernias
- Rubens Bassini (1933–1985), Brazilian musician and percussionist
- Laurence Bassini (b. 1970), English businessman

== See also ==
- Italian destroyer Angelo Bassini
