= Sestri =

Sestri may refer to:

- Sestri Levante, a municipality in the Province of Genoa (Italy)
- Sestri Ponente, a suburb of the city of Genoa (Italy)
