= SS Francesco Crispi (1925) =

1925 Italian passenger ship

History
- Name: Francesco Crispi
- Namesake: Francesco Crispi
- Owner: (1926–1932) Citra - Compagnia Italiana Transatlantica; (1932–1937) Tirrenia (Flotte Riunite Florio-Citra); (1937–1943) Lloyd Triestino
- Port of registry: (Kingdom of Italy) Triest, Italy
- Builder: Ansaldo G. & Co. - Societa Nazionale di Navigazione Ansaldo
- Yard number: 194
- Laid down: 1920
- Launched: 10 September 1926
- Completed: December 1926
- Acquired: December 1926
- Maiden voyage: December 1926
- In service: December 1926
- Out of service: 19 April 1943
- Identification: Official number: 1438; Call sign: IBJM
- Fate: Torpedoed and sunk on 19 April 1943

General characteristics
- Type: Passenger ship
- Tonnage: 7,600 GRT
- Length: 136.3 m (447 ft 2 in)
- Beam: 16.1 m (52 ft 10 in)
- Depth: 8.2 m (26 ft 11 in)
- Installed power: Six steam turbines
- Propulsion: Two screws
- Sail plan: Genoa - Livorno - Naples - Messina - Port Said - Port Sudan - Massawa - Aden - Dante - Mogadishu - Kismayo - Mombasa - Zanzibar - Dar es Salaam
- Speed: 16 knots (30 km/h; 18 mph)
- Capacity: Accommodation for 445 passengers (69 in First class, 170 in Second class & 206 in Steerage)
- Notes: Two masts and two funnels

SS Francesco Crispi was an Italian passenger ship that was serving as a troopship when she was torpedoed and sunk by the British submarine HMS Saracen on 19 April 1943 in the Tyrrhenian Sea 18 nautical miles (33 km) west off Elba while she was travelling from Livorno to Bastia in convoy, with the loss of 800 lives.

== Construction ==
Francesco Crispi was laid down at the Ansaldo G. & Co. shipyard in La Spezia, Italy in 1920 for the Transatlantica Italiana Società di Navigazione, to be used for the express mail service between Italy and the Americas, but due to financial problems the construction of the ship was suspended. After several years on 22 December 1925, the incomplete ship was purchased by the Compagnia Italiana Transatlantica which resumed her construction. The ship was able to be launched on 10 September 1926 and was completed in December that same year. The ship was 136.3 metres (447 ft 2 in) long, had a beam of 16.1 metres (52 ft 10 in) and a depth of 8.2 metres (26 ft 11 in). She was assessed at 7,600 GRT and had six steam turbines driving two screw propellers that could achieve a speed of 16 knots (30 km/h; 18 mph). The ship had accommodation for 445 passengers including 69 in First class, 170 in Second class, and 206 in Steerage. She had one sister ship, Giuseppe Mazzini.

== Early career ==
Francesco Crispi entered service in December 1926 for Compagnia Italiana Transatlantica and sailed the Genoa to Dar es Salaam route with stopovers in Livorno, Naples, Messina, Port Said, Port Sudan, Massawa, Aden, Dante, Mogadishu, Kismayo, Mombasa and Zanzibar. The ship underwent some refits before being transferred to Tirrenia on 15 December 1931 and adding Cape Town as a new destination until 28 July 1932. Francesco Crispi saw brief service as a troopship during the Second Italo-Ethiopian War, shipping thousands of Italian soldiers to fight in Ethiopia. The ship was transferred to Lloyd Triestino in 1937, the same year the ship would bring a piece of the Obelisk of Axum from Ethiopia to Italy so it could be reassembled in Rome.

== War service and loss ==
Francesco Crispi was requisitioned by the Italian Royal Navy on 2 January 1941 and once again put to use as a troopship which she started in February 1941 when she departed Brindisi for Albania in convoy. Francesco Crispi always sailed in convoy for ports in Albania and Greece, including on 28 March 1942 when her convoy was attacked by British submarines, resulting in the loss of the troopship Galilea alongside nearly 1,000 of the men aboard her, yet Francesco Crispi escaped undamaged. In June 1942, the ship was chosen as one of the troopships that would participate in the proposed Axis invasion of Malta, the invasion however never manifested and was called off on 5 January 1943. Instead, Francesco Crispi was utilized to ship Italian forces from Livorno to Corsica beginning in November 1942 to offset the Anglo-American landings in French North Africa. During her voyages to Corsica, the ship suffered multiple incidents such as an unsuccessful aircraft attack on 8 January 1943, which saw two dropped bombs explode in close proximity to the ship but failed to damage her, and an attack from the British submarine HMS Torbay on 27 February 1943, which fired four torpedoes at Francesco Crispi but all missed their target. On 12 March 1943, the French submarine Casabianca fired four torpedoes at the convoy which included Francesco Crispi, but all missed their targets.

Francesco Crispi departed Livorno on a routine voyage to Bastia in convoy on 19 April 1943, when at 12.58 am, the convoy was spotted by the submarine HMS Saracen which proceeded to get into position to strike Francesco Crispi and another merchant ship in the convoy. Saracen fired six torpedoes at the ships from a distance of 4,600 metres (15,091 ft 10 in) at 1.25 pm and three torpedoes struck Francesco Crispi while the other torpedoes missed their target. The ship quickly started to sink by the stern as the troops aboard her took to the lifeboats or jumped overboard. Three lifeboats were successfully launched before the ship's bow rose vertically out of the water and sank beneath the waves only 16 minutes after the attack. The Italian destroyer Giuseppe La Masa, which had escorted Francesco Crispi before the attack, tried to sink the British submarine by the use of depth charges, but the submarine managed to escape unscathed. A vast rescue operation was launched by the Italian command following the sinking of Francesco Crispi and 676 men were rescued over the next four hours by many rescue ships which included the tugboats Turbine and Vulcano, the steamers Angela and Capitano Sauro, several fishing boats and a number of Italian Royal Navy vessels including those that were originally part of the initial convoy such as the Italian armed merchant cruiser Caralis. Most of the survivors were landed at their original destination of Bastia and a total of 70 survivors were instead landed at Portoferraio, additionally 16 bodies were recovered at sea of which 13 were buried in Bastia. Additional areal searches were held by the use of aircraft but no more survivors were spotted, which led to a final death toll of about 800 men.

== Wreck ==
Francesco Crispi's wreck was discovered on 31 May 2015 at 42°45′N 9°42′E. The wreck lies upright and partially buried in the muddy seabed in 507 metres (1,663 ft) of water. The ship remains mostly intact and is populated by large colonies of white corals. Following her discovery, a silver memorial plaque was left on the site to honour all the lives that were lost in the ship's sinking.
