= Angelo Bassini =

Italian soldier and patriot

- Born: July 29, 1815; Pavia, Kingdom of Sardinia
- Died: January 3, 1889 (aged 73); Pavia, Kingdom of Italy
- Military career
- Allegiance: Kingdom of Sardinia; Kingdom of Italy
- Branch: Royal Sardinian Army; Royal Italian Army
- Rank: Colonello (Colonel)
- Conflicts: First Italian War of Independence; Expedition of the Thousand; Second Italian War of Independence; Battle of Aspromonte; Third Italian War of Independence; Battle of Monte Suello; Battle of Mentana
- Awards: Silver Medal of Military Valor

Angelo Bassini (Pavia, 29 July 1815 – Pavia, 3 January 1889) was an Italian patriot and soldier who served during the unification of Italy, including duty as a colonello (colonel) during the Expedition of the Thousand.

== Biography ==
Angelo Bassini was born in Pavia in the Kingdom of Sardinia on 29 July 1815 to a family of probable Milanese origins. He served initially in the Imperial Austrian Army, but deserted to take part in the First Italian War of Independence on the Italian side in 1848. During the war, he participated in the defense of Rome against French forces during the Siege of Rome in 1849.

During the Second Italian War of Independence in 1859 he served as a Redshirt under Giuseppe Garibaldi in 1859, and in 1860 he was assigned to the 8th Company with the title of colonello (colonel) during Garibaldi's Expedition of the Thousand. He again served under Garibaldi during the Battle of Aspromonte in 1862.

With the outbreak of the Third Italian War of Independence in 1866, Bassini enlisted in Garibaldi's Corpo Volontari Italiani (Italian Volunteer Corps) as tenente colonnello (lieutenant colonel) of the 3rd Regiment. On 3 July 1866 he was wounded in the Battle of Monte Suello, for which he received the Silver Medal of Military Valor with the citation: "Slightly wounded, he continued to fight."

Discharged from the army in 1866, Bassini returned to Pavia, where he dedicated himself to educational assistance, but on 3 November 1867 he participated in the Battle of Mentana. He died in Pavia on 3 January 1889.

== Honors and awards ==
- Silver Medal of Military Valor

== Commemoration ==
The Italian Regia Marina (Royal Navy) destroyer Angelo Bassini was named for Bassini.
