= Cannon 102/45 =

Cannone da 102/45 S.A. Mod. 1917
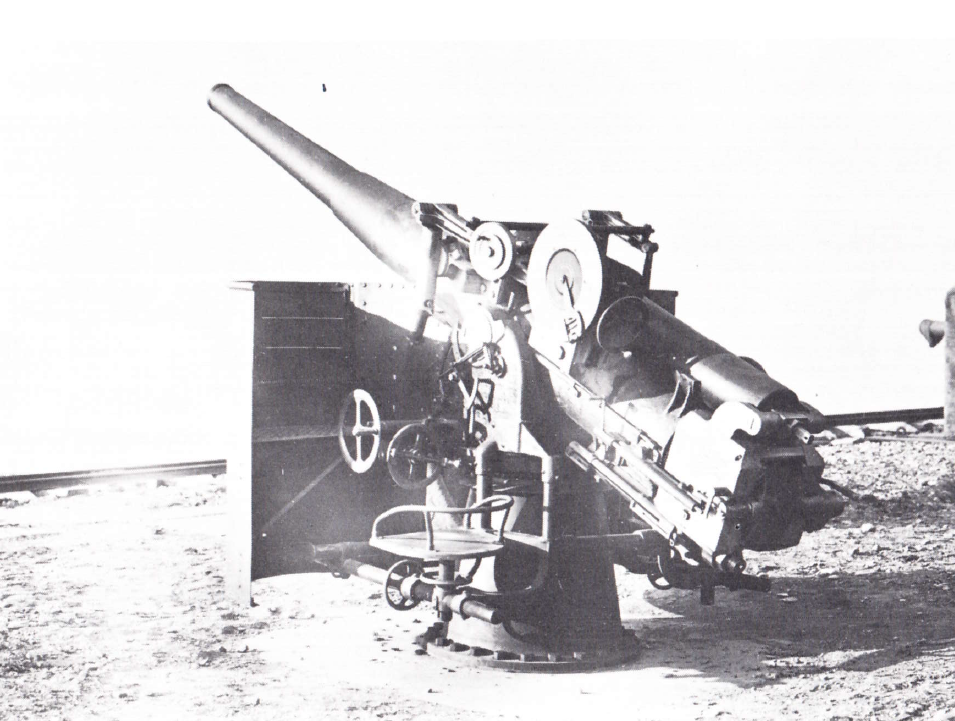
- A Cannone da 102/45 S.A. Mod. 1917 at the range.
- Type: Naval gun Coastal artillery
- Place of origin: United Kingdom

Service history
- In service: 1917-1945
- Used by: Italy; Spain
- Wars: World War I Spanish Civil War; World War II

Production history
- Manufacturer: Ansaldo
- Produced: 1917-1919
- Variants: Schneider-Armstrong; Mod. 1917-1919

Specifications
- Mass: 2,350 kilograms (5,180 lb)
- Length: 4.79 meters (15 ft 9 in)
- Barrel length: 4.57 meters (15 ft 0 in)
- Shell: 102x749,5 R
- Shell weight: 13.75 kilograms (30.3 lb)
- Caliber: 102 millimeters (4.0 in); 45 Caliber
- Breech: Rotating vertical breech block
- Elevation: -10°/+30°
- Traverse: -360°
- Rate of fire: 7 rpm
- Muzzle velocity: 850 m/s (2,800 ft/s)
- Maximum firing range: Horizontal: 15 kilometres (9.3 mi) at +30°

The Cannone da 102/45 S.A. Mod. 1917 was a naval gun of the Italian Navy in World War I and World War II, which was later modified for shore based coastal artillery roles.

== History ==
During World War I the United Kingdom delivered a QF 4 inch Mk V naval gun, serial No.974 to Italy to act as a template for licensed production by the Ansaldo Company.

The Mark V was constructed of a tapered inner A tube, A tube, taper wound wire, full-length jacket and breech ring.

The 102/45 differs from the original British gun mainly by the breech block: while the Mark V had an horizontal slyding breech block the 102/45 had a Schneider type vertical rotating breech block. The gun used fixed quick-fire ammunition. The production at Ansaldo run from 1917 to 1919.

There were two models produced: Schneider-Armstrong Mod. 1917 in single mount and Schneider-Armstrong Mod. 1917-1919 in twin mount.

While the single Schneider-Armstrong Mod. 1917 proved to be satisfactory the twin Schneider-Armstrong Mod. 1917-1919 was not and its use was limited to the Curtatone-class.

In the mid '20s the gun was replaced as the standard gun of the new destroyer classes by the 120/45, installed starting with the Sella-class.

In 1937, during the Spanish Civil War, the former scouts Alessandro Poerio (renamed Huesca) and Guglielmo Pepe (renamed Teruel) were handed over to the Nationalists complete with their single S.A. Mod. 1917 guns. During service with the Spanish Navy the 102/45s were fitted with new shields.

In 1942 the Spanish Navy decided to disarm the two worn-out units and re-use their artillery: two 102/45 guns were assigned to arm the destroyer Velasco and another four to two coastal batteries.

== Interesting facts ==
- The muzzle velocities of the 102/45 are higher than the Mk V 719 m/s (2,360 ft/s) implying greater working pressure. What effect this had on barrel life and accuracy is unknown.
- The rates of fire for the 102/45 (7 rpm) and Mk V (8-10 rpm) are different.

== Types ==
Mounts	Model	Weight	Elevation	Naval Classes
Single Mount	Schneider-Armstrong Mod. 1917	4,600 kg	-10°/+30°	Generali-class, Palestro-class, La Masa class, Giuseppe Sirtori (since 1920), Mirabello-class (since 1920), Alessandro Poerio class (since 1918).
Twin Mount	Schneider-Armstrong Mod. 1917-1919	10,194 kg	-10°/+30°	Curtatone-class.

== Bibliography ==
- Ministero della Marina (1929). Manuale del cannoniere. Roma.
- Ministero della Marina (1927). tavola: Cannone da 102/45 S.A. 1917 su affusto normale, a culla ed a piedistallo - tavola: Cannone da 102/45 S.A. 1917-1919 su affusto a culla binata ed a piattaforma. Roma.
- M.V.S.N. (1943). Nozioni di cultura tecnica e militare per l'ufficiale della MILMART. Roma.
- Castronovo, Valerio (1997). Storia dell'Ansaldo Vol.4- L'Ansaldo e la Grande Guerra, 1915-1918. Roma: Laterza.
- Fioravanzo, Giuseppe (1971). I cacciatorpediniere italiani 1900-1971. Roma: USMM.
- Mortera Pérez, Artemio (2006). La artilleria naval en la guerra civil española, 1936/39.
- Campbell, John (1985). Naval Weapons of World War Two. Naval Institute Press. ISBN 0-87021-459-4.
- Fraccaroli, Aldo (1974). Italian Warships of World War II. London, England: Ian Allan Publishing. OCLC 834485650.
- Friedman, Norman (2011). Naval Weapons of World War One. Barnsley, South Yorkshire, UK: Seaforth. ISBN 978-1-84832-100-7.
