= Cantieri navali Odero =

Italian shipyard

Cantieri navali Odero (Odero Shipyard)
- Industry: Shipbuilding
- Founded: 1846
- Defunct: 1949
- Headquarters: Genoa-Sestri Ponente

Cantieri navali Odero ("Odero Shipyard") is a defunct Italian shipyard. Founded in 1846 by the Westerman brothers in Genoa-Sestri Ponente, the company was taken over by Nicolò Odero in 1872. Together with the Ansaldo-San Giorgio shipyard at Muggiano and the armament works of Vickers-Terni, it was amalgamated into Odero-Terni by Attilio Odero, which, in turn, absorbed the Cantiere navale fratelli Orlando of Leghorn (Livorno) two years later. The consolidated company became the Società per la Costruzione di Navi, Macchine ed Artiglierie Odero-Terni-Orlando (OTO) (later OTO Melara). The shipyard closed in 1949.

== Bibliography ==
- Brescia, Maurizio (2012). Mussolini's Navy: A Reference Guide to the Regina Marina 1930–45. Annapolis, Maryland: Naval Institute Press. ISBN 978-1-59114-544-8.

== See also ==
- Category:Ships built by Cantieri navali Odero
