= Sestri Ponente =

Industrial suburb of Genoa, Italy

Coordinates: 44.4240°N 8.8500°E

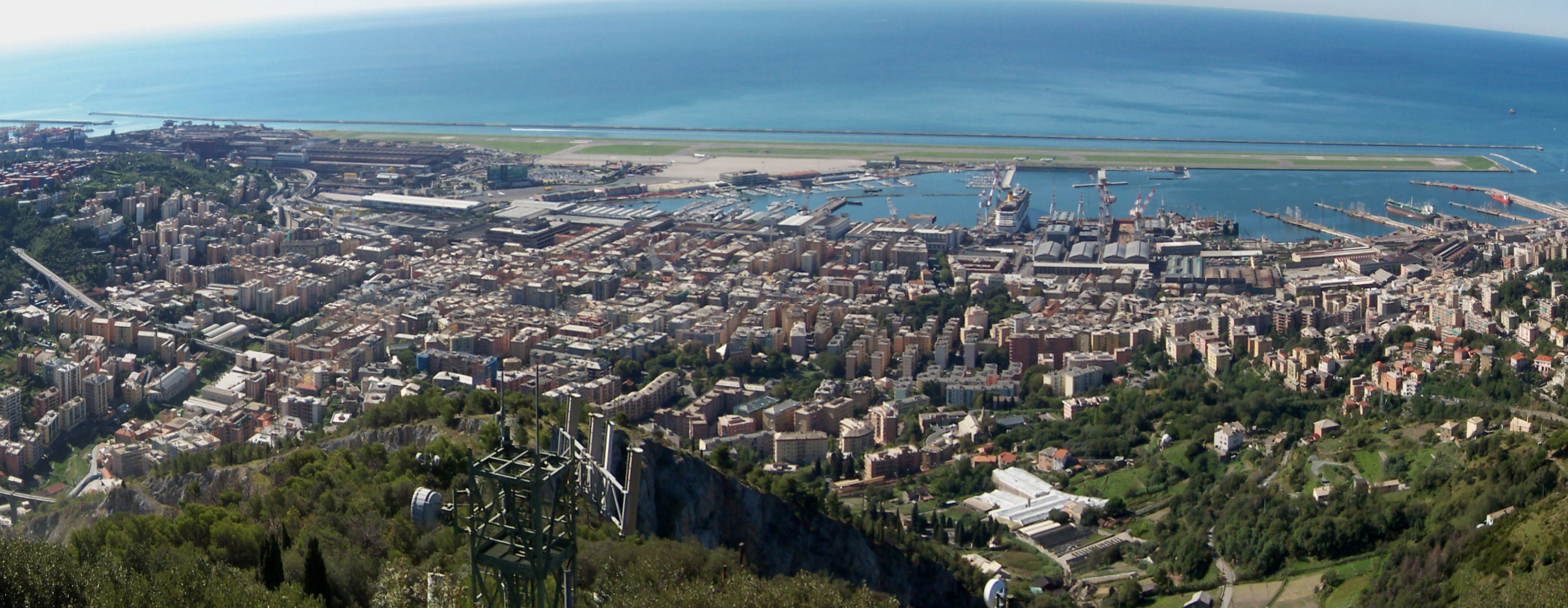
- Interactive map of Sestri Ponente
- Country: Italy
- Region: Liguria
- Metropolitan City: Genoa
- City: Genoa
- District: Medio Ponente

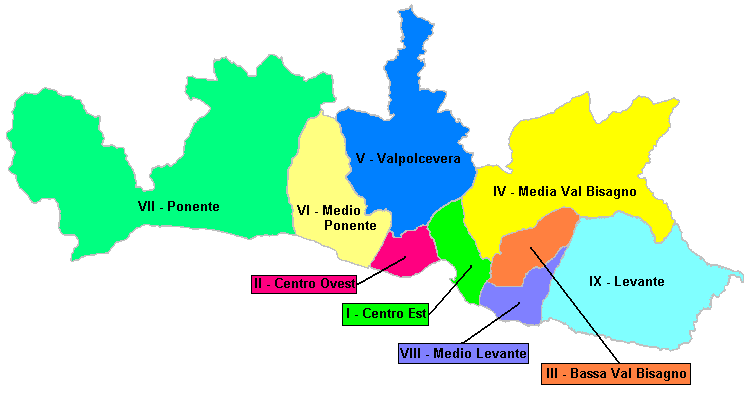
The Medio Ponente (municipio) administrative district is the westernmost of the yellow areas.

Sestri Ponente is an industrial suburb of Genoa in northwest Italy. It is part of the Medio Ponente municipio of Genoa.

== Geography ==
Historical population
1901	17,225	(100%)

It is situated on the Ligurian Sea four miles to the west of the city, between Pegli and Cornigliano. Its population is currently about 50,000, but in the 1970s it was as high as 80,000.

== History ==
The name is derived from the Latin Sextum, a small village that was likely founded in the second century A.D., where stones were assembled for the Roman road that left from Genoa. No physical records exist about the population of Sestri before the fifteenth century.

Around 1911, the town had iron-works saw-mills, shipbuilding yards and tanneries and factories for macaroni, matches and tobacco.

== Economy ==
The links to the transport sector continue to this day; Sestri Ponente is home to Genoa Cristoforo Colombo Airport. Another major source of employment are the shipyards, part of the Fincantieri. They are currently enjoying the benefits of the current ship construction boom after the blows felt from the 1970s to the 1990s.
