= List of protected cruisers of Italy =

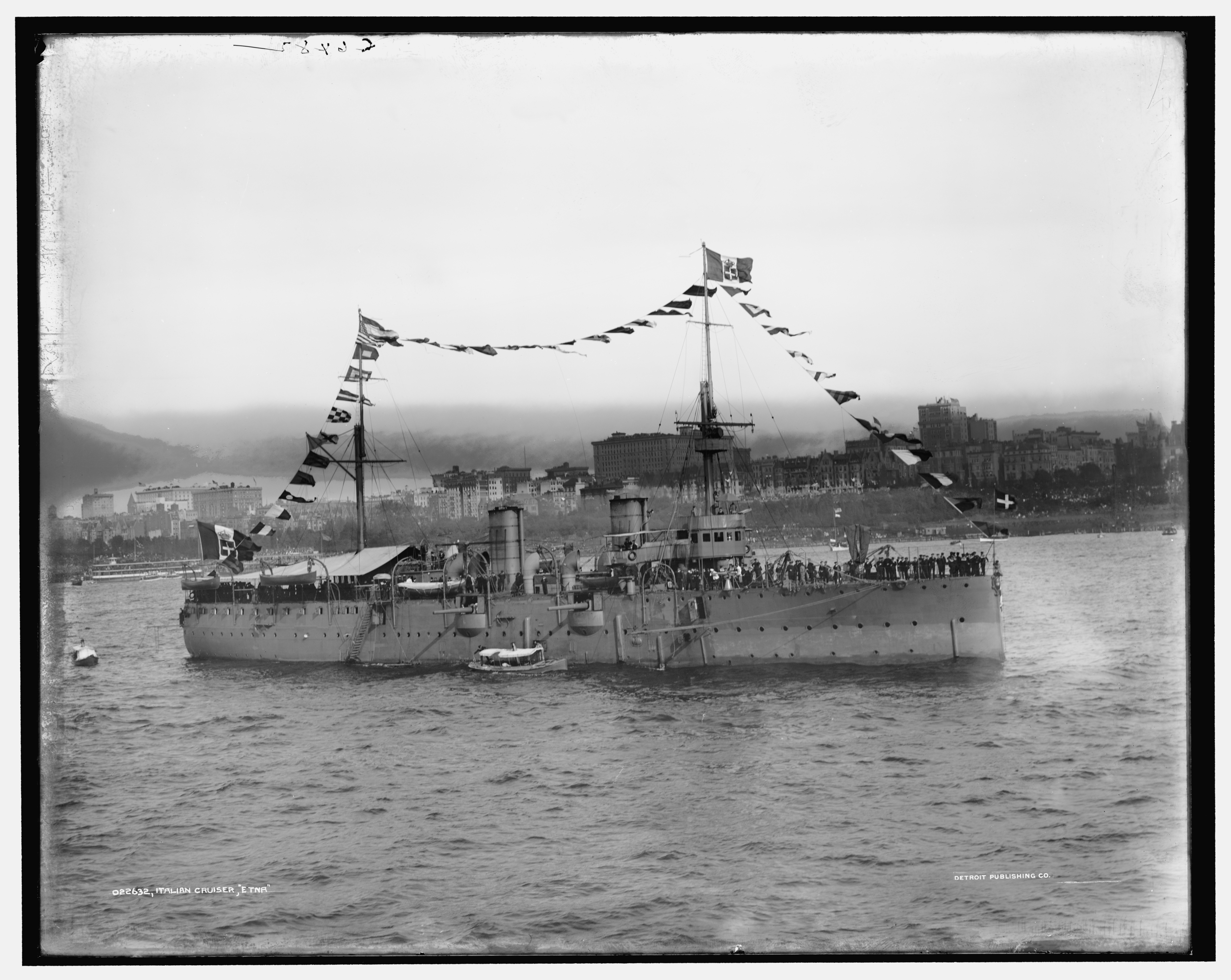
Etna during a visit to the United States in 1909

From the 1880s to 1910s, the Italian Regia Marina (Royal Navy) built or purchased twenty protected cruisers; the earliest vessels were either built or designed in Britain, though later vessels were constructed in Italy, to Italian designs. Several of these cruisers were ground-breaking warships: Dogali was the first major warship equipped with triple-expansion engines and Piemonte was the first warship armed entirely with quick-firing guns. The first two designs, Giovanni Bausan and the Etna class, were armed with large-caliber guns and marked a brief experimentation with the Jeune École in the 1880s, which represented a shift away from expensive battleships in favor of cheaper vessels that could theoretically destroy battleships easily. Italian naval strategists quickly discarded the concept and returned to more traditional strategies centered on a fleet of battleships. As a result, later cruisers returned to medium-caliber batteries.

The first several designs were intended to fill a variety of roles, including fleet scouts and colonial cruisers, but beginning with Calabria, which was solely intended for colonial duties, the Regia Marina began to build more specialized vessels. Quarto, Nino Bixio, and Marsala were designed as fast scouts for the main fleet, and the last design, the Campania class, were slower vessels for use in the colonies. One vessel, Libia, was an exception to Italian design preferences. The ship had been ordered by the Ottoman Navy, but the Ottomans failed to pay for the ship, so she remained incomplete until the Italo-Turkish War in 1911, when she was seized by Italy and completed for the Regia Marina.

Italian protected cruisers served in many roles across the globe. Many were deployed to Italy's colonies in Africa, or to foreign stations in the Americas and Asia to show the flag. They were also assigned to the main fleet in the Mediterranean, where they served as scouts. As the vessels aged, many were converted for secondary duties, becoming training ships, depot ships, and headquarters ships. Many of the early vessels saw action during the Italo-Turkish War, bombarding Ottoman positions in North Africa and the Arabian Peninsula and blockading ports in the Red Sea. During World War I, most of the vessels saw little action, owing to the cautious strategy adopted by both Italy and Austria-Hungary, but Quarto battled an Austro-Hungarian cruiser in 1915 and Marsala took part in the Battle of the Strait of Otranto in May 1917. After the war, most of the remaining vessels were scrapped or reduced to secondary roles, having been supplanted by ex-German and Austro-Hungarian vessels taken as war prizes and newer light cruisers built in the 1920s.

Key
Armament	The number and type of the primary armament
Armor	The thickness of the deck armor
Displacement	Ship displacement at full combat load
Propulsion	Number of shafts, type of propulsion system, and top speed/horsepower generated
Service	The dates work began and finished on the ship and its ultimate fate
Laid down	The date the keel began to be assembled
Commissioned	The date the ship was commissioned

== Giovanni Bausan ==
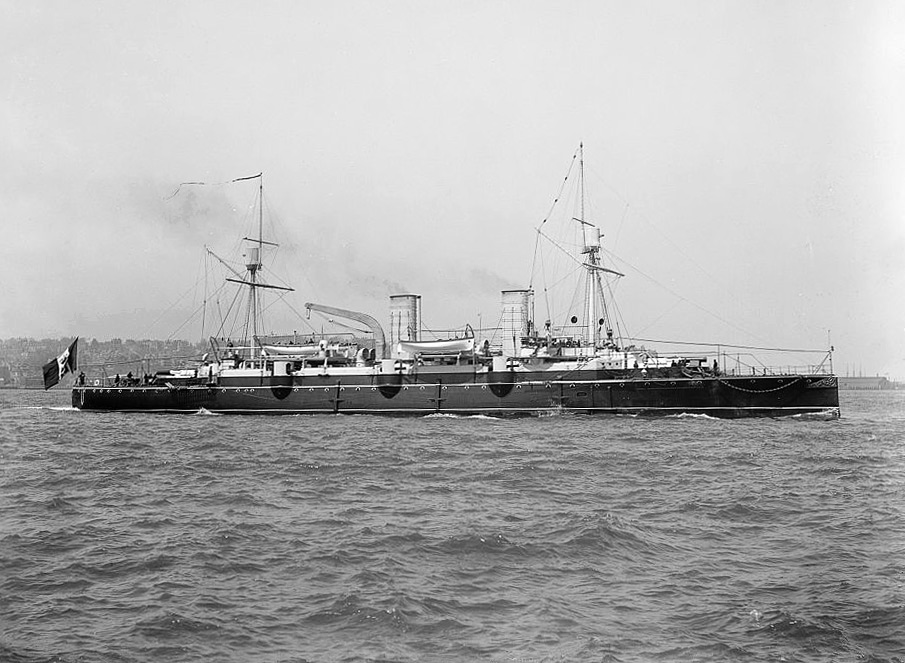
Giovanni Bausan, probably in the United States in 1893

Giovanni Bausan was the first protected cruiser built for the Italian Regia Marina (Royal Navy). The ship was designed by George Rendel at the Armstrong Whitworth shipyard in Britain; the design was based on the Chilean Esmeralda. Equipped with a pair of 10-inch (254 mm) guns, Giovanni Bausan was intended as a "battleship destroyer", since these weapons would be able to defeat the heavy armor of the much larger—and much more expensive—battleships in foreign navies. She nevertheless proved to be unsatisfactory for this role, since the guns fired too slowly and she was too unstable to be a good gunnery platform. Construction of the ship—along with the subsequent Etna class, for which Giovanni Bausan provided the basis—represented the Regia Marina's brief experimentation with the Jeune École doctrine.

Giovanni Bausan frequently served abroad. She participated in the conquest of Eritrea in 1887–1888 as the flagship of the Italian squadron during the campaign. She took part in the Venezuelan crisis of 1902–1903 alongside several other Italian, British, and German warships. The ship was withdrawn from front-line service by 1905 and was employed as a training ship. During the Italo-Turkish War of 1911–1912, she provided gunfire support to Italian troops ashore in North Africa. By the outbreak of World War I, Giovanni Bausan had been relegated to secondary duties, first as a distilling ship, and later as a depot ship for seaplanes. The ship was disarmed during the conflict and ultimately was sold to ship-breakers in March 1920.

Summary of the Giovanni Bausan class
Ship	Armament	Armor	Displacement	Propulsion	Service		
Ship	Armament	Armor	Displacement	Propulsion	Laid down	Commissioned	Fate
Giovanni Bausan	2 × 10 in (254 mm) guns	1.5 in (38 mm)	3,082 long tons (3,131 t)	2 shafts, 2 compound-expansion steam engines, 6,470 ihp (4,820 kW), 17.4 knots (32.2 km/h; 20.0 mph)	21 August 1882	9 May 1885	Sold for scrap, 1920

== Etna class ==
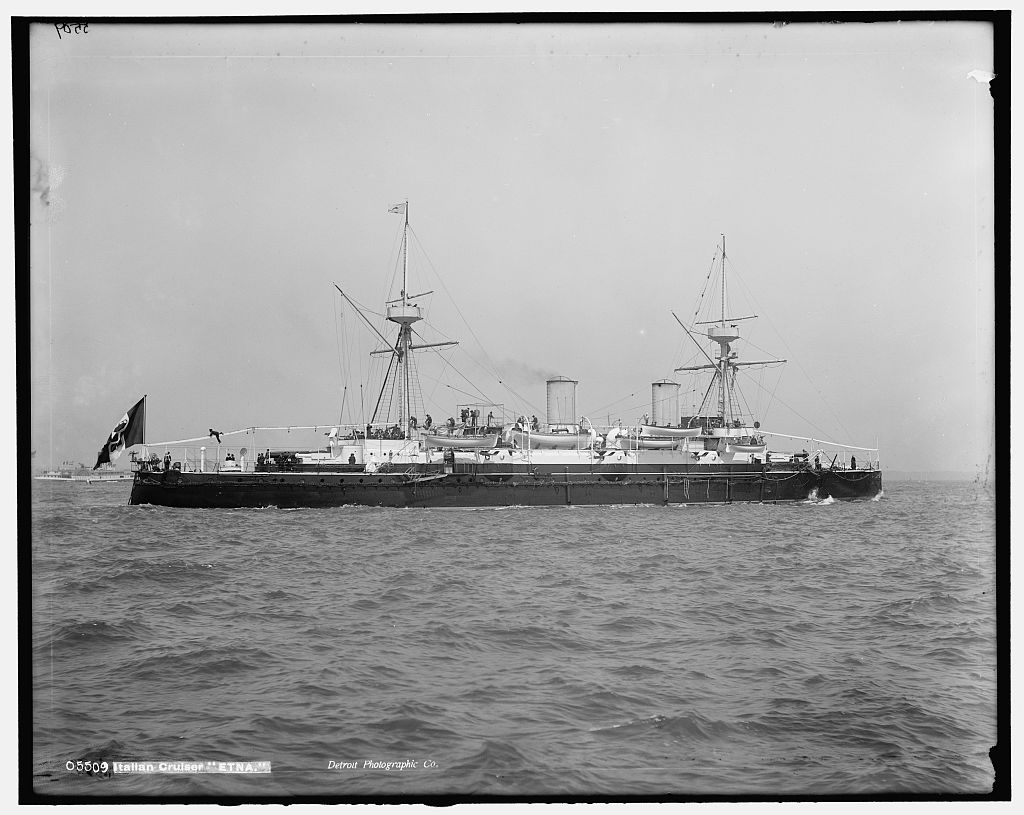
Etna, probably during her visit to the United States with Giovanni Bausan

The Etna class was an improved version of the preceding Giovanni Bausan, being slightly larger but carrying the same armament and armor protection. License-built variants of the earlier ship, they were partially designed by George Rendel, who had also designed Giovanni Bausan. As such, they suffered from the same limitations as the earlier vessel that were imposed by their slow-firing 10-inch guns and poor stability.

The four cruisers nevertheless had long service lives, which included periods with the main Italian fleet as well as on foreign stations. Etna served on the North American Station from 1893 to 1895, and in 1899, Ettore Fieramosca, Vesuvio, and Stromboli participated in the suppression of the Boxer Uprising in China. Etna was rebuilt into a training ship in 1905–1907, and in 1909 she took part in the Hudson–Fulton Celebration. Ettore Fieramosca was the first member of the class to be decommissioned, and she was sold for scrap in 1909. Stromboli followed in 1911 and Vesuvio was discarded in 1915. Etna remained in service longer than her sisters; she saw action during the Italo-Turkish War, and during World War I, she served as the headquarters ship in Taranto. She was ultimately discarded in 1921.

Summary of the Etna class
Ship	Armament	Armor	Displacement	Propulsion	Service		
Ship	Armament	Armor	Displacement	Propulsion	Laid down	Commissioned	Fate
Etna	2 × 10 in guns	1.5 in	3,373 to 3,474 long tons (3,427 to 3,530 t)	2 shafts, 2 horizontal compound-expansion steam engines, 6,252 to 7,480 ihp (4,662 to 5,578 kW), 17 kn (31 km/h; 20 mph)	19 January 1884	2 December 1887	Sold for scrap, 1921
Stromboli	2 × 10 in guns	1.5 in	3,373 to 3,474 long tons (3,427 to 3,530 t)	2 shafts, 2 horizontal compound-expansion steam engines, 6,252 to 7,480 ihp (4,662 to 5,578 kW), 17 kn (31 km/h; 20 mph)	31 August 1884	20 March 1888	Sold for scrap, 1911
Vesuvio	2 × 10 in guns	1.5 in	3,373 to 3,474 long tons (3,427 to 3,530 t)	2 shafts, 2 horizontal compound-expansion steam engines, 6,252 to 7,480 ihp (4,662 to 5,578 kW), 17 kn (31 km/h; 20 mph)	10 July 1884	16 March 1888	Sold for scrap, 1915
Ettore Fieramosca	2 × 10 in guns	1.5 in	3,373 to 3,474 long tons (3,427 to 3,530 t)	2 shafts, 2 horizontal compound-expansion steam engines, 6,252 to 7,480 ihp (4,662 to 5,578 kW), 17 kn (31 km/h; 20 mph)	31 December 1885	16 November 1889	Sold for scrap, July 1909

== Dogali ==
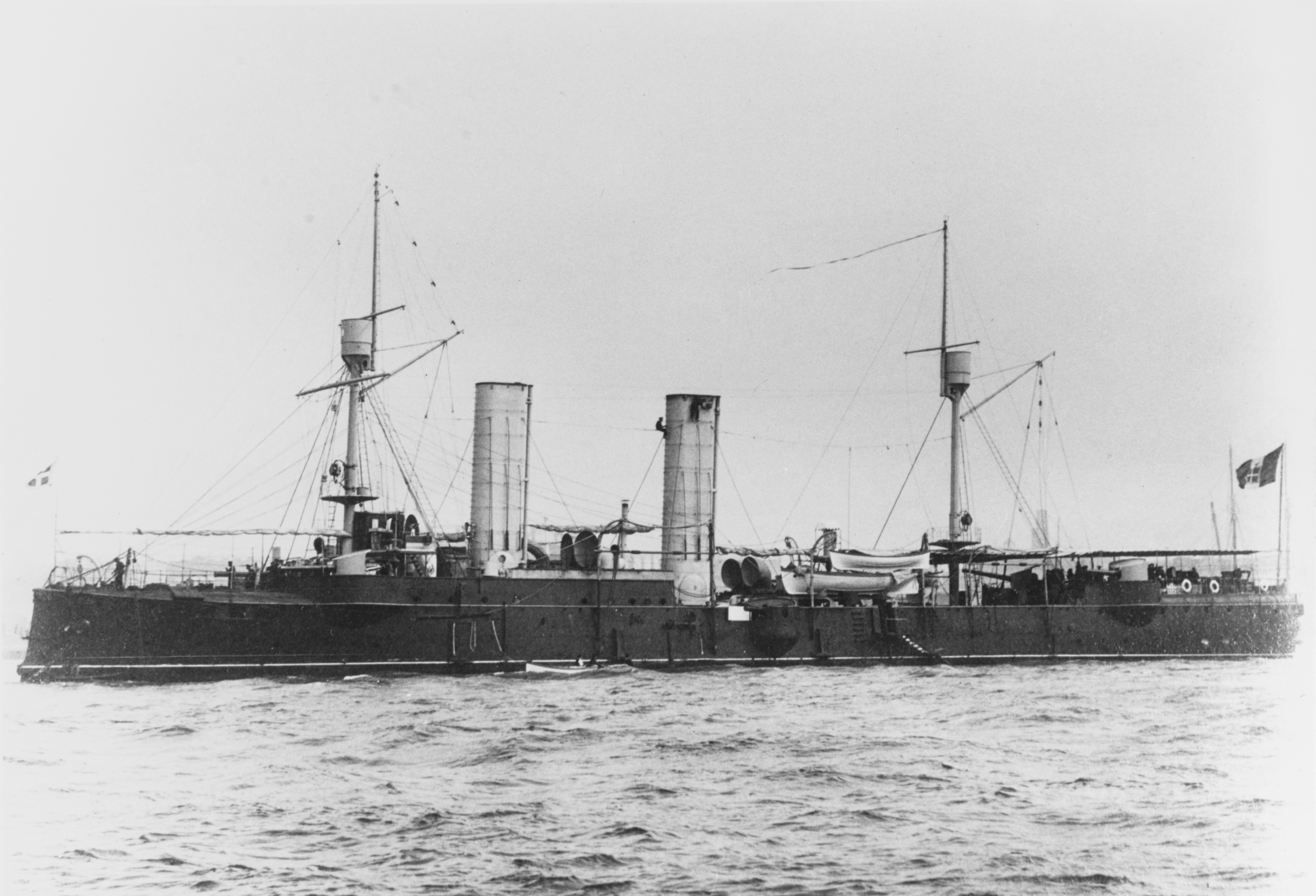
Dogali in the 1890s

Dogali was originally designed by William Henry White of Armstrong Whitworth for the Greek Navy. She was initially named Salamis, but the Greek Navy put the ship up for sale while she was still under construction. Italy purchased the vessel and renamed her Angelo Emo and then Dogali before she entered service. Her career was uneventful, with her early years spent with the main fleet conducting training exercises. In 1893 she represented Italy at the World's Columbian Exposition, and was present in Brazil during the Revolta da Armada (Revolt of the Fleet), where she protected Italian interests from the unrest. In 1908, Italy sold 'Dogali to Uruguay, and she was renamed 25 de Agosto. In 1911, she became Montevideo, and she was decommissioned in 1914. She remained in the Uruguayan Navy's inventory until 1932, when she was sold for scrap.

Summary of the Dogali class
Ship	Armament	Armor	Displacement	Propulsion	Service		
Ship	Armament	Armor	Displacement	Propulsion	Laid down	Commissioned	Fate
Dogali	6 × 5.9 in (150 mm) guns	2 in (51 mm)	2,050 long tons (2,080 t)	2 shafts, 2 vertical triple-expansion steam engines, 7,179 ihp (5,353 kW), 19.66 kn (36.41 km/h; 22.62 mph)	13 February 1885	28 April 1887	Sold to Uruguay, 1908, scrapped, 1932

== Piemonte ==
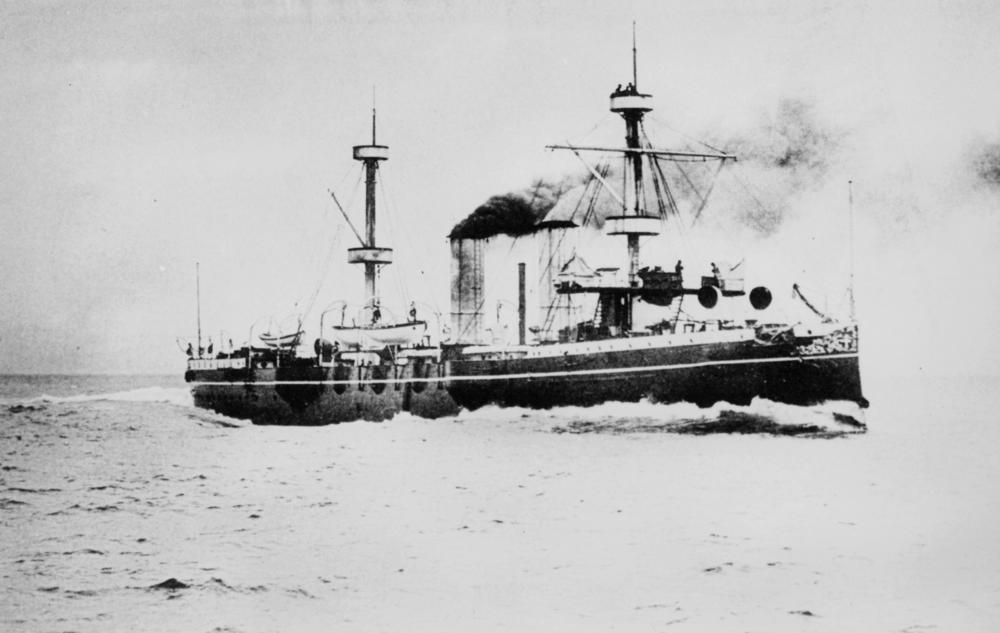
Piemonte steaming at high speed

Piemonte, designed by Philip Watts at Armstrong Whitworth, was based on the preceding Dogali. Originally intended to carry a pair of 8-inch (203 mm) guns and four 6-inch (152 mm) guns, the Italian Navy instead requested a uniform battery of six 6-inch guns. She proved to be a revolutionary vessel, as she was the first major warship to be armed entirely with quick-firing, medium-caliber guns; these became the standard for all cruisers from the 1890s onward.

The ship had an eventful career. She was briefly assigned to the main fleet, but by the early 1890s, she was serving abroad in the Red Sea and Indian Ocean. In 1896 she was sent to Brazil to protect Italian nationals in the country after unrest in the country targeted Europeans. By 1901, Piemonte was assigned to the East Asia Station. By the outbreak of the Italo-Turkish War, the ship was again stationed in the Red Sea. She led a pair of destroyers in the Battle of Kunfuda Bay, where she sank or destroyed seven Ottoman gunboats, destroying Ottoman naval strength in the area. For the rest of the war, she blockaded and bombarded Ottoman ports. During World War I, she was assigned to the Second Fleet, based in Brindisi, but she did not see action. Piemonte was sold for scrap in 1920.

Summary of the Piemonte class
Ship	Armament	Armor	Displacement	Propulsion	Service		
Ship	Armament	Armor	Displacement	Propulsion	Laid down	Commissioned	Fate
Piemonte	6 × 6 in (152 mm) guns	3 in (76 mm)	2,473 long tons (2,513 t)	2 shafts, 2 vertical triple-expansion steam engines, 12,000 ihp (8,900 kW), 22 kn (41 km/h; 25 mph)	1887	8 August 1889	Scrapped, 1920

== Regioni class ==
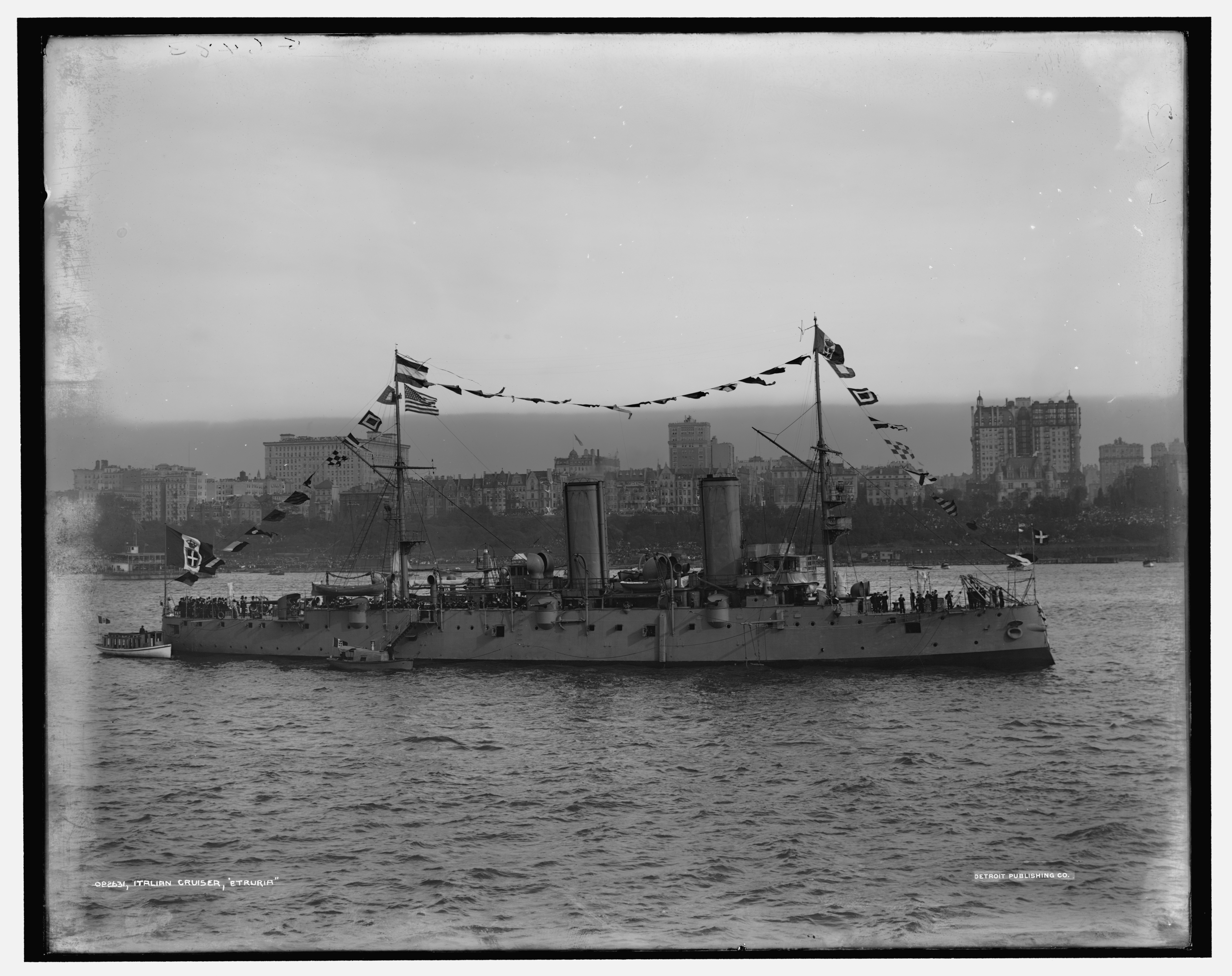
Etruria in the United States in 1909

The six Regioni-class cruisers—so named as all vessels save Elba were named for regions of Italy—were the first protected cruisers designed by Italian naval architects. They were built by four different shipyards, and so varied slightly in size, speed, and armament. They proved to be a disappointment in service, owing to their slow speed and weak armor protection.

They served in a variety of capacities throughout their careers, including scouts for the main fleet, colonial cruisers, and representatives of Italy at major foreign events. While on the China Station, Elba observed the Russo-Japanese War, including the Battle of Chemulpo Bay in 1904, where she picked up Russian survivors. Lombardia was converted into a depot ship for submarines in 1906. Elba and Liguria were equipped with observation balloons in 1907–1908. In 1910, Umbria was sold to Haiti and renamed Consul Gostrück, though she quickly sank under the care of her inexperienced crew.

The remaining ships, except for Lombardia, took part in the Italo-Turkish War. They were relegated to secondary roles during World War I, except for Puglia, which battled the Austro-Hungarian cruiser SMS Novara and later covered the evacuation of the Serbian Army from Durazzo. Etruria was deliberately blown up by Italy as a deception operation against Austria-Hungary. The remaining ships were broken up for scrap in the early 1920s, though the bow section of Puglia is preserved at the Vittoriale degli Italiani, a museum in Lombardy.

Summary of the Regioni class
Ship	Armament	Armor	Displacement	Propulsion	Service		
Ship	Armament	Armor	Displacement	Propulsion	Laid down	Commissioned	Fate
Umbria	4 × 6 in guns 6 × 4.7 in (119 mm) guns	2 in	2,245 to 2,689 long tons (2,281 to 2,732 t)	2 shafts, 2 vertical triple-expansion steam engines, 5,536 to 7,471 ihp (4,128 to 5,571 kW), 17.9 to 20 kn (33.2 to 37.0 km/h; 20.6 to 23.0 mph)	1 August 1888	16 February 1894	Sold to Haiti, 1910; Foundered, 1911
Lombardia	4 × 6 in guns 6 × 4.7 in (119 mm) guns	2 in	2,245 to 2,689 long tons (2,281 to 2,732 t)	2 shafts, 2 vertical triple-expansion steam engines, 5,536 to 7,471 ihp (4,128 to 5,571 kW), 17.9 to 20 kn (33.2 to 37.0 km/h; 20.6 to 23.0 mph)	19 November 1889	16 February 1893	Sold for scrap, 4 July 1920
Etruria	4 × 6 in guns 6 × 4.7 in (119 mm) guns	2 in	2,245 to 2,689 long tons (2,281 to 2,732 t)	2 shafts, 2 vertical triple-expansion steam engines, 5,536 to 7,471 ihp (4,128 to 5,571 kW), 17.9 to 20 kn (33.2 to 37.0 km/h; 20.6 to 23.0 mph)	1 April 1889	11 July 1894	Sunk, 13 August 1918
Liguria	4 × 6 in guns 6 × 4.7 in (119 mm) guns	2 in	2,245 to 2,689 long tons (2,281 to 2,732 t)	2 shafts, 2 vertical triple-expansion steam engines, 5,536 to 7,471 ihp (4,128 to 5,571 kW), 17.9 to 20 kn (33.2 to 37.0 km/h; 20.6 to 23.0 mph)	1 July 1889	1 December 1894	Sold for scrap, 15 May 1921
Elba	4 × 6 in guns 6 × 4.7 in (119 mm) guns	2 in	2,245 to 2,689 long tons (2,281 to 2,732 t)	2 shafts, 2 vertical triple-expansion steam engines, 5,536 to 7,471 ihp (4,128 to 5,571 kW), 17.9 to 20 kn (33.2 to 37.0 km/h; 20.6 to 23.0 mph)	22 September 1890	27 February 1896	Sold for scrap, 5 January 1920
Puglia	4 × 6 in guns 6 × 4.7 in (119 mm) guns	1 in	2,245 to 2,689 long tons (2,281 to 2,732 t)	2 shafts, 2 vertical triple-expansion steam engines, 5,536 to 7,471 ihp (4,128 to 5,571 kW), 17.9 to 20 kn (33.2 to 37.0 km/h; 20.6 to 23.0 mph)	October 1893	26 May 1901	Sold for scrap, 22 March 1923, partially preserved as a memorial

== Calabria ==
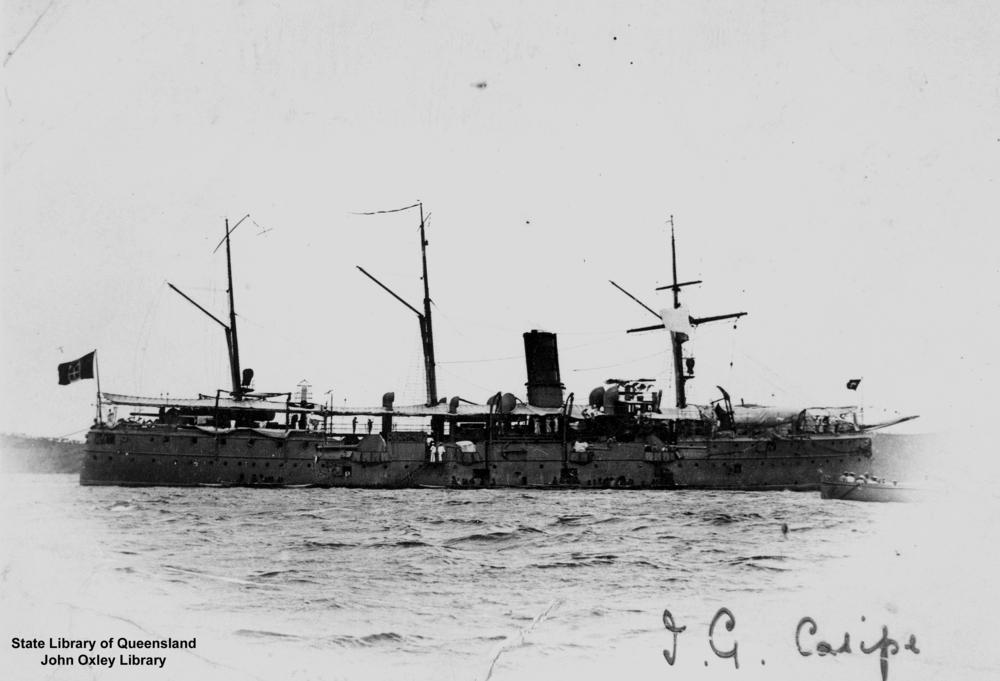
Calabria, probably during her visit to Australia in 1905

Calabria was designed for use in Italy's colonial empire, rather than the earlier vessels intended as fleet scouts. As such, her steel hull was sheathed with wood and then a layer of zinc to protect it from fouling during lengthy tours in the overseas colonies. Additionally, she was equipped with less powerful though more efficient engines than the earlier cruisers. The ship was otherwise similar to preceding designs like the Regioni class, having a displacement only slightly lower and a nearly identical gun battery.

The ship's career spanned the globe, and ranged from a deployment to China to help suppress the Boxer Uprising in 1899–1901, to tours in the Americas throughout the 1900s, and a trip to Australia in 1905. During the Italo-Turkish War, she was transferred to the Red Sea, where she bombarded Ottoman troops and ports and helped to enforce a blockade before returning to Italy in April 1912 for a refit. The ship continued to serve in the Red Sea during World War I and as a result, did not see action. She was reclassified as a gunboat in 1921 and then a training ship in early 1924, before being sold for scrap in November 1924.

Summary of the Calabria class
Ship	Armament	Armor	Displacement	Propulsion	Service		
Ship	Armament	Armor	Displacement	Propulsion	Laid down	Commissioned	Fate
Calabria	4 × 6 in guns 4 × 4.7 in guns	2 in	2,453 long tons (2,492 t)	2 shafts, 2 vertical triple-expansion steam engines, 4,260 ihp (3,180 kW), 16.4 kn (30.4 km/h; 18.9 mph)	February 1892	12 July 1897	Sold for scrap, 13 November 1924

== Libia ==
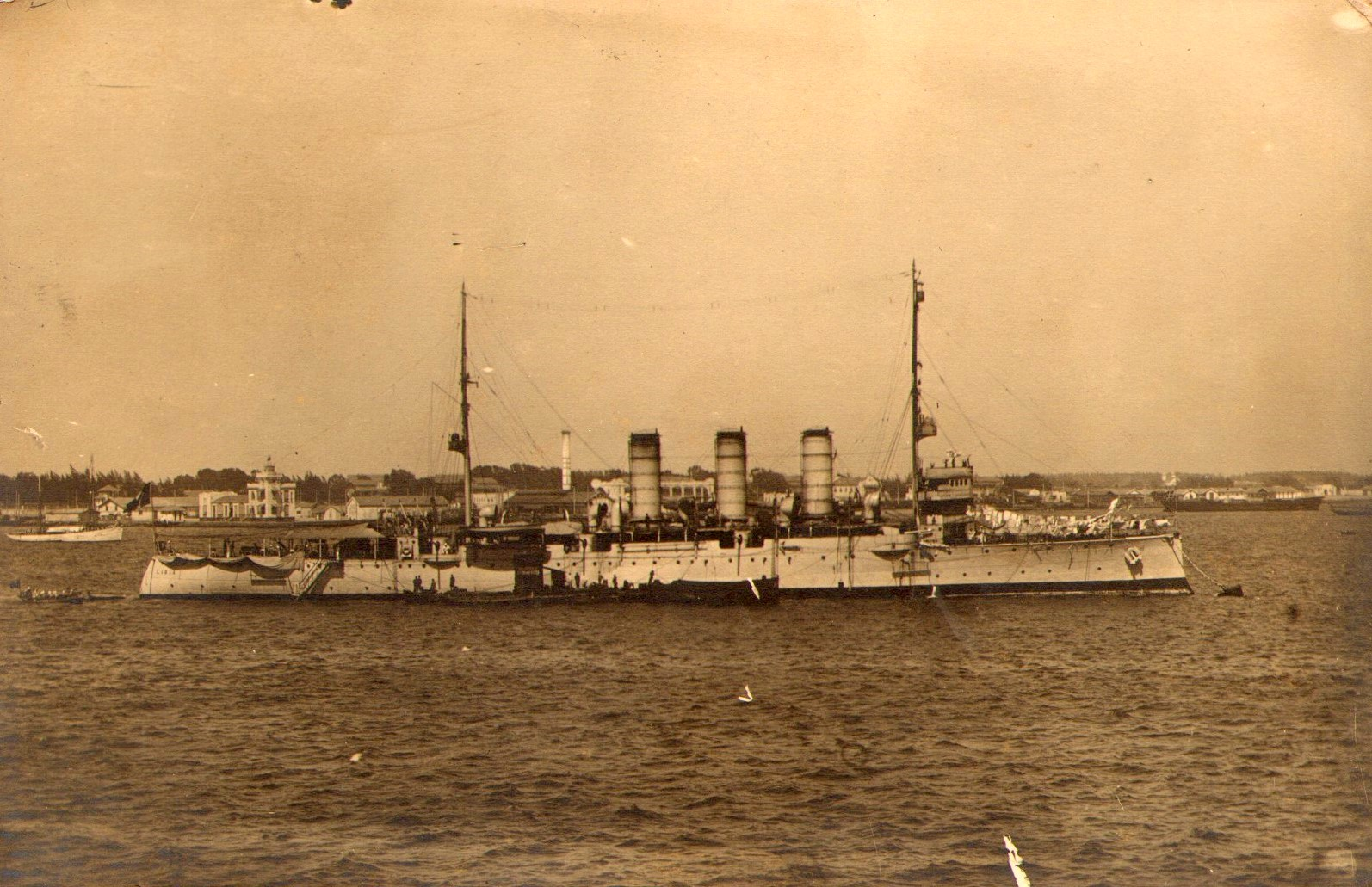
Libia at anchor

Libia marked a major advancement over earlier designs, owing in large part due to the fact that the ship was originally ordered by the Ottoman Navy. Based on the British-built Hamidiye, the ship was to have been named Drama, but the Ottoman government failed to make payments so construction stopped, and she was seized after the outbreak of the Italo-Turkish War and completed for the Regia Marina. She was significantly larger, faster, and more heavily armored than the other Italian protected cruisers, but she carried a weaker main battery.

As a scout for the main fleet, Libia spent much of World War I in port, acting as a fleet in being to deter the Austro-Hungarian Navy from attempting any major operations. In 1921 the ship went on a world tour under the command of Admiral Ernesto Burzagli. During the cruise, she stopped in San Francisco, United States in November, where she stayed for a month. While there, she was filmed for a short documentary by the then-unknown film director Frank Capra on 6 and 7 November—though it did not generate much attention, it was Capra's first publicly screened film. She was deployed to China in 1925, where she was stationed until the early 1930s. After returning to Italy and being laid up in 1935, Libia was eventually sold for scrap in March 1937.

Summary of the Libia class
Ship	Armament	Armor	Displacement	Propulsion	Service		
Ship	Armament	Armor	Displacement	Propulsion	Laid down	Commissioned	Fate
Libia	2 × 6 in guns 8 × 4.7 in guns	4 in (100 mm)	3,760 long tons (3,820 t)	2 shafts, 2 vertical triple-expansion steam engines, 11,530 ihp (8,600 kW), 22.9 kn (42.4 km/h; 26.4 mph)	1907	25 March 1913	Sold for scrap, 1937

== Quarto ==
Illustration of Quarto

Quarto represented another major shift in Italian cruiser designs; unlike earlier designs that attempted to fill multiple roles, Quarto was optimized for use as a fleet scout. She also incorporated advances like steam turbines and mixed oil and coal-fired boilers, which produced a much higher top speed. Intended to engage only hostile scouts, her armament was significantly weaker than earlier cruisers, mounting a battery of only 4.7-inch guns. She was also fitted with equipment to handle 200 naval mines to allow her to serve as a fast minelayer. Unlike many of her fellow cruisers, Quarto was quite active during World War I, as she was stationed at Brindisi to support the Otranto barrage. While on patrols throughout the war, she encountered Austro-Hungarian and German U-boats, though they frequently misjudged her speed, causing them to miss with their torpedoes. She engaged in a long gunnery duel with the Austro-Hungarian cruiser Helgoland in December 1915, but neither vessel was seriously damaged. Quarto supported Italian forces during the Second Italo-Ethiopian War in 1935–1936, before serving as the flagship of Italian forces participating in the non-intervention patrols in 1936 and 1937 during the Spanish Civil War. Stricken from the naval register in January 1939, she was thereafter allocated for weapons testing. The commando unit Decima Flottiglia MAS tested new SLC human torpedoes and MT explosive motorboats on Quarto in 1940, the latter causing extensive damage and sinking the ship in November.

Summary of the Quarto class
Ship	Armament	Armor	Displacement	Propulsion	Service		
Ship	Armament	Armor	Displacement	Propulsion	Laid down	Commissioned	Fate
Quarto	6 × 4.7 in guns	1.5 in	3,440 long tons (3,500 t)	4 shafts, 4 steam turbines, 25,000 shp (19,000 kW), 28 kn (52 km/h; 32 mph)	14 November 1909	31 March 1913	Sunk in weapons tests, November 1940

== Nino Bixio class ==
Illustration of Marsala

The Regia Marina decided to follow Quarto with two more similar ships, which became the Nino Bixio class. These two ships carried an identical armament and the same scale of armor protection. They were significantly heavier and had one fewer turbine, though, and this resulted in poor performance. Nino Bixio and Marsala proved to be a disappointment in service, owing to their unreliable engines and their failure to meet their design speed of 29 knots (54 km/h; 33 mph). During World War I, the two ships were based at Brindisi with Quarto, where they patrolled the southern end of the Adriatic Sea, though Nino Bixio did not see action in the conflict. Marsala was the only Italian cruiser at Brindisi to have steam in her boilers when an Austro-Hungarian cruiser flotilla attacked the Otranto barrage in May 1917; she briefly engaged the hostile vessels in the Battle of the Strait of Otranto before the Austro-Hungarians withdrew. Both ships were discarded in the late 1920s.

Summary of the Nino Bixio class
Ship	Armament	Armor	Displacement	Propulsion	Service		
Ship	Armament	Armor	Displacement	Propulsion	Laid down	Commissioned	Fate
Nino Bixio	6 × 4.7 in guns	1.5 in	3,575 long tons (3,632 t)	3 shafts, 3 steam turbines, 23,000 shp (17,000 kW), 26.82 to 27.66 kn (49.67 to 51.23 km/h; 30.86 to 31.83 mph)	15 February 1911	5 May 1914	Sold for scrap, 1929
Marsala	6 × 4.7 in guns	1.5 in	3,575 long tons (3,632 t)	3 shafts, 3 steam turbines, 23,000 shp (17,000 kW), 26.82 to 27.66 kn (49.67 to 51.23 km/h; 30.86 to 31.83 mph)	15 February 1911	4 August 1914	Sold for scrap, 1927

== Campania class ==
The last pair of protected cruisers built by the Italian Navy were intended for colonial service, and were based on experience from Calabria. They were given a relatively heavy main battery for their small size and a long cruising range, at the expense of armor protection and speed. The ships were so small that they could be built on the same slipway and launched the same day. Since they had been launched less than a week before hostilities broke out at the end of July 1914, fitting-out work was delayed by a steel shortage, particularly after Italy entered the war. Campania and Basilicata initially served in Libya; neither had eventful careers. The latter vessel was destroyed by a boiler explosion in Tewfik on 13 August 1919. Campania was reclassified as a gunboat in 1921 and became a training ship in 1932. She ultimately was sold for scrap in 1937.

During the war, Italy stopped building cruisers, since destroyers, submarines, and smaller patrol vessels were more useful in operations against the Austro-Hungarians. After the war, the anemic Italian economy could not support significant naval construction programs. Additionally, Italy had received several modern light cruisers from the defeated Germans and Austro-Hungarians, and these ships formed the backbone of the Italian cruiser force.

Summary of the Campania class
Ship	Armament	Armor	Displacement	Propulsion	Service		
Ship	Armament	Armor	Displacement	Propulsion	Laid down	Commissioned	Fate
Campania	6 × 6 in guns	1 in	2,483 long tons (2,523 t)	2 shafts, 2 vertical triple-expansion steam engines, 4,129 to 5,001 ihp (3,079 to 3,729 kW), 15.5 to 15.7 kn (28.7 to 29.1 km/h; 17.8 to 18.1 mph)	9 August 1913	18 April 1917	Sold for scrap, 1937
Basilicata	6 × 6 in guns	1 in	2,483 long tons (2,523 t)	2 shafts, 2 vertical triple-expansion steam engines, 4,129 to 5,001 ihp (3,079 to 3,729 kW), 15.5 to 15.7 kn (28.7 to 29.1 km/h; 17.8 to 18.1 mph)	9 August 1913	1 August 1917	Sunk by boiler explosion, 13 August 1919

== See also ==
- List of heavy cruisers of Italy
- List of torpedo cruisers of Italy
