= Italian torpedo boat Pallade =

Pallade was the name of at least two ships of the Italian Navy and may refer to:

- Italian torpedo boat Pallade (1906), a Pegaso-class torpedo boat launched in 1906 and discarded in 1923.
- Italian torpedo boat Pallade (1937), a Spica-class torpedo boat launched in 1937 and sunk in 1943.
