= Italian torpedo boat Calliope =

Calliope was the name of at least two ships of the Italian Navy and may refer to:

- Italian torpedo boat Calliope (1906), a Pegaso-class torpedo boat launched in 1906 and discarded in 1924.
- Italian torpedo boat Calliope (1938), a Spica-class torpedo boat launched in 1938 and stricken in 1958.
