= Italian torpedo boat Calipso =

Calipso was the name of at least two ships of the Italian Navy and may refer to:

- Italian torpedo boat Calipso (1909), a Pegaso-class torpedo boat launched in 1909 and discarded in 1927.
- Italian torpedo boat Calipso (1938), a Spica-class torpedo boat launched in 1937 and sunk in 1940.
