= Orione-class torpedo boat =

Orione class
Class overview
- Builders: Odero, Sestri Ponente
- Operators: Regia Marina
- Preceded by: Pegaso class
- Built: 1905–1907
- In commission: 1907–1923
- Completed: 4
- Retired: 4

General characteristics
- Type: High-Seas Torpedo boat
- Displacement: 220 t (217 long tons)
- Length: 51.00 m (167 ft 4 in) pp; 52.65 m (172 ft 9 in) oa
- Beam: 6.0 m (19 ft 8 in)
- Draught: 1.53 m (5 ft 0 in)
- Propulsion: 2 × Vertical triple-expansion steam engines; 2 Coal-fired Blechynden boilers; 2,900 ihp (2,200 kW)
- Speed: 25 kn (46 km/h; 29 mph)
- Range: 300 nmi (350 mi; 560 km) at 24 knots (44 km/h; 28 mph)
- Complement: 3 officer + 35 men
- Armament: 3× 47 mm/40 guns; 3× 450 mm (17.7 in) torpedo tubes

The Orione class was a class of four sea-going steam-powered torpedo boats of the Italian Regia Marina (Royal Navy) built by the Odero shipyard of Sestri Ponente from 1905 to 1907. They served in the Italo-Turkish War and the First World War.

== Construction and design ==
On 31 March 1905, four torpedo boats were laid down at the Italian shipbuilder Odero's Sestri Ponente, Genoa shipyard. (Note: This was part of a larger programme of high-seas torpedo boat construction for the Italian Navy. Six Sirio-class torpedo boats were built by the German shipyard Schichau-Werke between 1904 and 1906, while a total of 18 Pegaso-class torpedo boats were built by Pattison of Naples and Odero between 1904 and 1909.) They were 51.0 metres (167 ft 4 in) long between perpendiculars and 52.65 metres (172 ft 9 in) overall, with a beam of 6.0 metres (19 ft 8 in) and a draught of 1.53 metres (5 ft 0 in). Two coal-fired Blechynden boilers fed steam to two sets of triple expansion steam engines rated at 2,900 indicated horsepower (2,200 kW), giving a design speed of 25 knots (46 km/h; 29 mph). Range was 300 nautical miles (560 km; 350 mi) at 24 knots (44 km/h; 28 mph) and 680 nautical miles (1,260 km; 780 mi) at 18 knots (33 km/h; 21 mph). Displacement was 220 tonnes (220 long tons). They were fitted with a slightly unusual clipper bow (a bow that curves forward as it rises from the water) and two closely spaced funnels.

Armament was the same as the Sirio and Pegaso classes, with three 450 mm (17.7 in) torpedo tubes and three 47 mm guns. Crew was three officers and 35 men.

== Service ==
The four ships of the class were completed from February 1907 to April 1908. Although the ships reached speeds of up to 25.4 knots (47.0 km/h; 29.2 mph) during sea trials, they were less seaworthy than the ships of the Pegaso class. Olimpia and Orfeo were deployed in relief efforts following the 1908 Messina earthquake that devastated Sicily and Calabria on 28 December 1908. Orione collided with the old coastal torpedo boat 128 S in April 1911. All four ships of the class were active during the Italo-Turkish War, serving in Libyan waters and in the Dodecanese.

During the First World War, the class formed the 1st Torpedo Boat Division, carrying out escort operations in Libyan waters, and between North Africa and Italy. Their armament was modified during the war, with the 47 mm guns replaced by two 76 mm guns and one of the torpedo tubes removed. Orfeo was badly damaged in a collision with the merchant ship Calabria on 10 December 1917, but was repaired. They were disposed of between 1920 and 1923.

== Ships ==
Ship	Laid down	Launched	Completed	Operational History
Orione	31 March 1905	29 March 1906	13 February 1907	Stricken 4 March 1923
Orsa	31 March 1905	5 May 1906	8 April 1907	Stricken 15 May 1921
Olimpia	31 March 1905	17 July 1906	8 April 1908	Stricken 1 July 1920
Orfeo	31 March 1905	23 April 1907	6 September 1907	Stricken 14 July 1923
