= Italian ship Serpente =

Serpente was the name of at least two ships of the Italian Navy and may refer to:

- Italian torpedo boat Serpente, a Sirio-class torpedo boat launched in 1905 and sunk in 1916.
- Italian submarine Serpente, an Argonauta-class submarine ordered as Nautilus Launched in 1932 and scuttled in 1943.
