= Italian ship Clio =

Clio was the name of at least three ships of the Italian Navy and may refer to:

- Italian cruiser Clio, a Partenope-class cruiser renamed Caprera in 1894 before she was launched and discarded in 1913.
- Italian torpedo boat Clio (1906), a Pegaso-class torpedo boat launched in 1906 and discarded in 1927.
- Italian torpedo boat Clio (1938), a Spica-class torpedo boat launched in 1938 and stricken in 1959.
