= Italian ship Spica =

Spica has been borne by at least four ships of the Italian Navy and may refer to:

- Italian torpedo boat Spica (1905), a Sirio-class torpedo boat launched in 1905 and discarded in 1923.
- Italian torpedo boat Spica (1934), a Spica-class torpedo boat launched in 1934. Sold to Sweden in 1940 and renamed HSwMS Romulus. Decommissioned in 1958.
- Italian torpedo boat Spica (1944), an Ariete-class torpedo boat captured before launch by Germany in 1943. She was renamed TA45 and launched in 1944. Sunk in 1945.
- Italian patrol vessel Spica (P 403), a Cassiopea-class patrol vessel launched in 1989.
