= Italian torpedo boat Climene =

Climene was the name of at least two ships of the Italian Navy and may refer to:

- Italian torpedo boat Climene (1909), a Pegaso-class torpedo boat launched in 1909 and discarded in 1926.
- Italian torpedo boat Climene (1936), a Spica-class torpedo boat launched in 1936 and sunk in 1943.
