= Italian ship Orsa =

Orsa has been borne by at least three ships of the Italian Navy and may refer to:

- Italian torpedo boat Orsa (1906), an Orione-class torpedo boat launched in 1906 and discarded in 1921.
- Italian torpedo boat Orsa (1937), an Orsa-class torpedo boat launched in 1937 and stricken in 1964.
- Italian frigate Orsa (F 567), a Lupo-class frigate launched in 1979 and transferred to Peru as Aguirre in 2004.
