= Climene =

Climene may refer to:

- Italian torpedo boat Climene, various Italian naval vessels
- Kirinia climene, a species of butterfly also known as the Iranian argus

== See also ==
- Climen, a brand name for estradiol valerate/cyproterone acetate
