= Italian ship Ardea =

Ardea was the name of at least two ships of the Italian Navy and may refer to:

- Italian torpedo boat Ardea, a Pegaso-class torpedo boat launched in 1907 and discarded in 1923.
- Italian corvette Ardea, a Gabbiano-class corvette seized by Germany and renamed UJ 2225. She was scuttled incomplete in 1945.
