= Italian ship Albatros =

Albatros was the name of at least three ships of the Italian Navy and may refer to:

- Italian torpedo boat Albatros, a Pegaso-class torpedo boat launched in 1907 and discarded in 1923.
- Italian submarine chaser Albatros, a submarine chaser launched in 1934 and sunk in 1941.
- Italian corvette Albatros, an Albatros-class corvette in service 1955–85
