= Italian ship Airone =

Airone was the name of at least three ships of the Italian Navy and may refer to:

- Italian torpedo boat Airone (1907), a Pegaso-class torpedo boat launched in 1907 and discarded in 1923.
- Italian torpedo boat Airone (1938), a Spica-class torpedo boat launched in 1938 and sunk in 1940.
- Italian corvette Airone (F 545), an Albatros-class corvette launched in 1954 and stricken in 1991.
