= Italian ship Astore =

Astore was the name of at least three ships of the Italian Navy and may refer to:

- Italian torpedo boat Astore (1907), a Pegaso-class torpedo boat launched in 1907 and discarded in 1923.
- Italian torpedo boat Astore (1934), a Spica-class torpedo boat launched in 1934 she was sold to Sweden in 1940 and renamed HSwMS Remus.
- Italian patrol boat Astore (P 423), a Sparviero-class patrol boat launched in 1981 and decommissioned in 2005.
