= List of heavy cruisers of Italy =

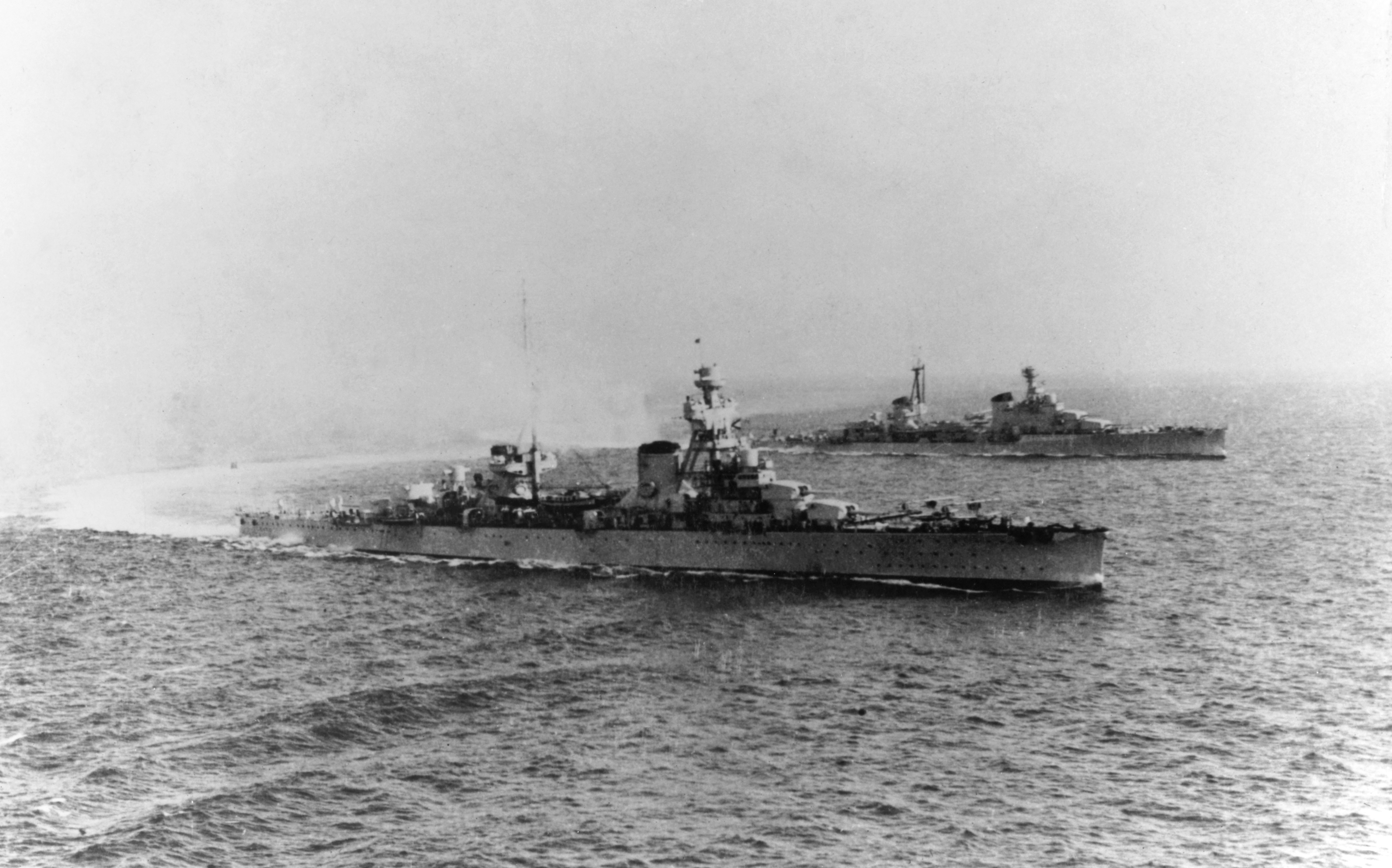
Trento (center) and Bolzano (background) underway

In the 1920s and 1930s, the Italian Regia Marina (Royal Navy) built a series of heavy cruisers as part of a modernization program to use the tonnage allotted to Italy for cruisers by the international naval treaties of the period. A total of seven vessels were built to three designs: two Trento-class cruisers, four Zara-class cruisers, and Bolzano, a modified version of the Trento design. The Regia Marina had initially intended to build six cruisers, which would operate as two three-ship divisions, but Pola of the Zara class was used as the fleet flagship while the Conte di Cavour-class battleships were being rebuilt, so a seventh ship was ordered. The seven ships represented disagreements within the naval high command, with one faction favoring high speed at the expense of armor protection (which resulted in the Trentos and Bolzano) and another that preferred heavier armor in exchange for a reduced top speed (which produced the Zaras). All of the ships were officially built to the limitations imposed by the Washington Naval Treaty, namely a standard displacement of 10,000 long tons (10,160 t) and an armament of 203-millimeter (8 in) main guns, though they all exceeded the displacement limit.

All seven ships saw extensive service in the Mediterranean Sea during World War II, where they repeatedly engaged elements of the British Royal Navy. Italian heavy cruisers took part in the Battles of Calabria, Taranto, Cape Spartivento, Cape Matapan, First and Second Sirte between 1940 and 1943. Three of the Zaras—Zara, Fiume, and Pola—were sunk in a close-range night action with British battleships at the Battle of Cape Matapan in 1941, Trento was torpedoed and sunk by British forces in June 1942, and Bolzano was badly damaged by a British submarine in August 1942, which left her out of action for the rest of the war. United States heavy bombers raided La Maddalena in April 1943, sinking Trieste and badly damaging Gorizia; the latter vessel and Bolzano were later attacked by Italian commandos while Italy was under German occupation in 1944 to prevent the Germans from repairing and reactivating them. They were both raised and scrapped after the war.

Key
Armament	The number and type of the primary armament
Armor	The maximum thickness of the armored belt
Displacement	Ship displacement at full combat load
Propulsion	Number of shafts, type of propulsion system, and top speed/horsepower generated
Service	The dates work began and finished on the ship and its ultimate fate
Laid down	The date the keel assembly commenced
Commissioned	The date the ship was commissioned

== Trento class ==
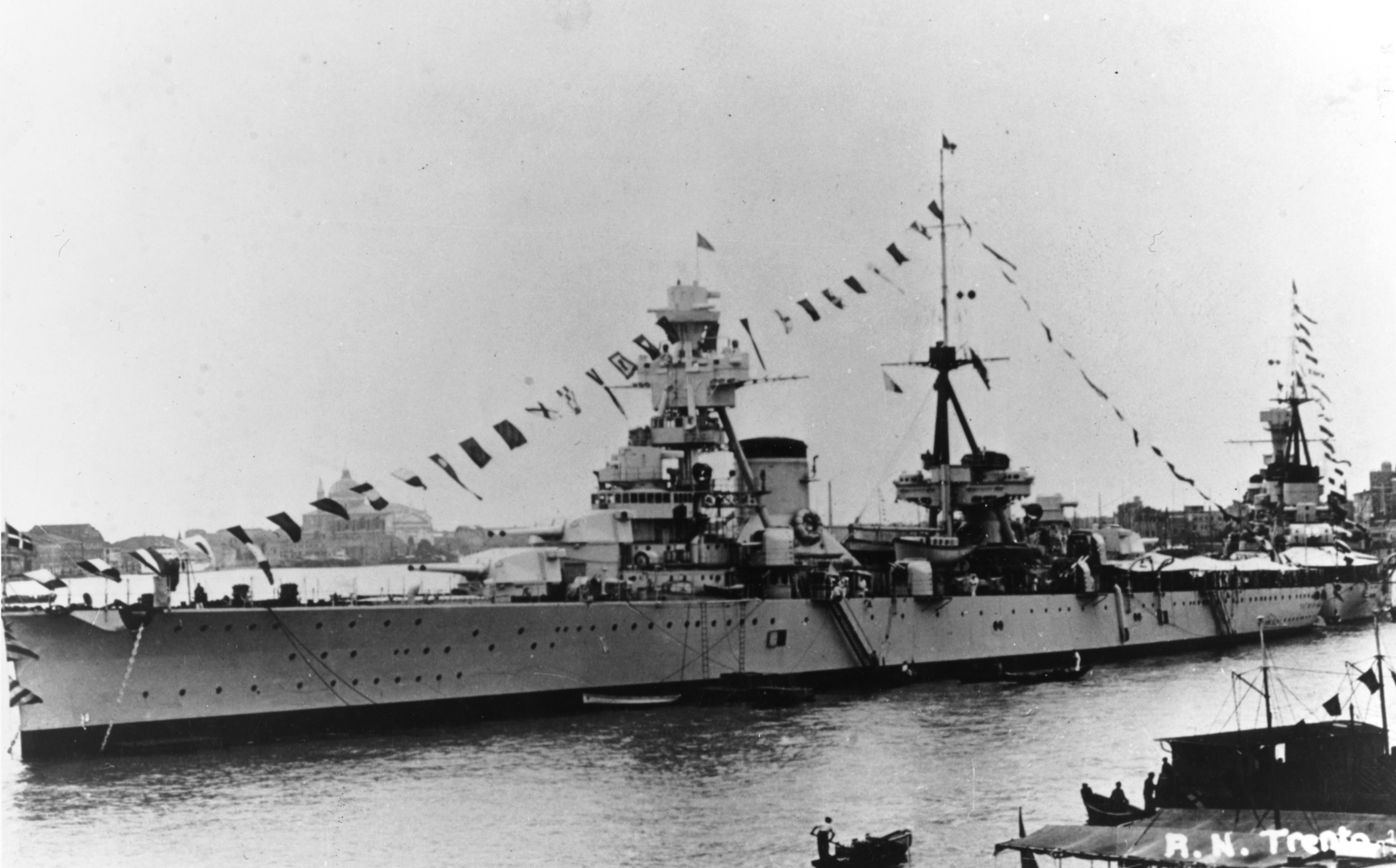
Trento early in her career

The Trento-class cruisers were ordered in 1924 in response to the French cruisers of the Duquesne class, which began construction that year. The Italian naval high command requested that the proposed cruisers have a very high top speed of 36 knots (67 km/h; 41 mph); the 1922 Washington Naval Treaty limited the standard displacement of new cruisers to 10,000 long tons (10,160 t) and their main armament to 203 mm (8 in) guns. To keep the design under the limit while achieving the speeds requested by the high command, the design staff was forced to drastically reduce the scale of armor protection. Their weak armor led officers in the Regia Marina to demand better-protected vessels for the next class of cruiser to be built. Ironically, the high speeds attained by Trento and Trieste could only be reached on very light displacements and in service, they could only manage around 31 knots (57 km/h; 36 mph), the same speed as the sturdier Zaras.

After Italy entered World War II in June 1940, Trento and Trieste saw extensive action against British forces in the Mediterranean Sea, including at the battles of Calabria, Cape Spartivento, and Cape Matapan in July and November 1940 and March 1941, respectively. In November 1941, Trieste was torpedoed by the submarine HMS Utmost; she spent most of the next year under repair. In the meantime, Trento was also present during the inconclusive First and Second Battles of Sirte. The Italian fleet sortied to attack the British Operation Harpoon convoy in June 1942, and while on the way, Trento was torpedoed twice, first by a Bristol Beaufighter torpedo bomber and then sunk by the submarine HMS Umbra with very heavy loss of life on 15 June. Trieste was moved to La Maddalena, Sardinia, where she was later sunk by United States heavy bombers on 10 April 1943.

Summary of the Trento class
Ship	Armament	Armor	Displacement	Propulsion	Service		
Ship	Armament	Armor	Displacement	Propulsion	Laid down	Commissioned	Fate
Trento	8 × 203 mm (8 in) / 50 caliber guns	70 mm (2.8 in)	13,334 long tons (13,548 t)	4 shafts, Parsons turbines, 36 kn (67 km/h; 41 mph), 150,000 shp (110,000 kW)	8 February 1925	3 April 1929	Sunk, 15 June 1942
Trieste	8 × 203 mm (8 in) / 50 caliber guns	70 mm (2.8 in)	13,334 long tons (13,548 t)	4 shafts, Parsons turbines, 36 kn (67 km/h; 41 mph), 150,000 shp (110,000 kW)	22 June 1925	21 December 1928	Sunk, 10 April 1943

== Zara class ==
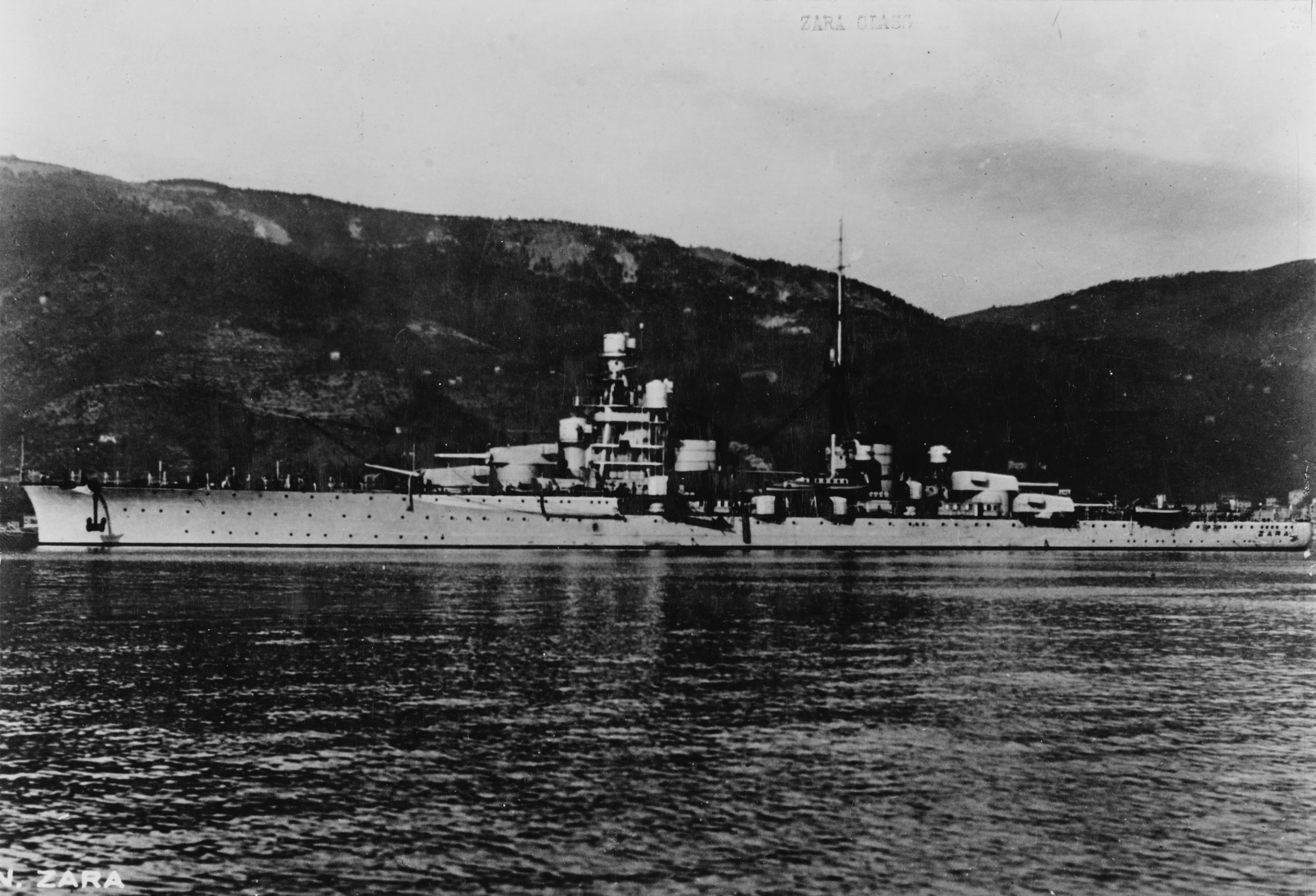
Zara in the 1930s

While the Trentos were still under construction, elements of the Italian naval command began to doubt the effectiveness of the new vessels, which sacrificed armor protection in favor of very high speeds. They advocated a more balanced design that would incorporate more comprehensive armor, while retaining the battery of eight 203 mm guns and a speed of at least 32 knots (59 km/h; 37 mph). To accomplish these goals, the high command permitted the designers to exceed the 10,000-ton limit, and instructed them to adopt as many weight-saving changes as possible. These included using a lightweight propulsion system, removing torpedo tubes from the design, and abandoning the flush deck of the Trentos in favor of a stepped down main deck. The heavy armor of the Zaras made them the best-protected cruisers built by any navy until the United States' Des Moines class, laid down in 1945.

The four ships all saw action at Calabria, Cape Spartivento, and Cape Matapan; at the last engagement, Pola was disabled by a torpedo from a Swordfish torpedo bomber launched by the British aircraft carrier HMS Formidable; Zara and Fiume were detached from the rest of the fleet to protect Pola, and all three and a pair of destroyers were sunk in a close-range night engagement with the battleships Barham, Valiant, and Warspite. Gorizia, the sole surviving member of the class, saw action at the First and Second Battles of Sirte in December 1941 and March 1942, respectively. While the ship was moored in La Maddalena on 10 April 1943, a major attack from United States Army Air Forces heavy bombers sank Trieste and hit Gorizia with three bombs, inflicting serious damage. She was still under repair in La Spezia when Italy surrendered to the Allies in September, and she was seized by German forces when they occupied much of the country. On 22 June 1944, Italian frogmen used Chariot manned torpedoes to enter the harbor and sink Gorizia, though Gorizia survived the attack. She was ultimately sold for scrap in 1949.

Summary of the Zara class
Ship	Armament	Armor	Displacement	Propulsion	Service		
Ship	Armament	Armor	Displacement	Propulsion	Laid down	Commissioned	Fate
Zara	8 × 203 mm / 53 cal. guns	150 mm (5.9 in)	13,944 to 14,330 long tons (14,168 to 14,560 t)	2 shafts, Parsons turbines, 32 knots (59 km/h; 37 mph), 95,000 shp (71,000 kW)	4 July 1929	20 October 1931	Sunk, 29 March 1941
Fiume	8 × 203 mm / 53 cal. guns	150 mm (5.9 in)	13,944 to 14,330 long tons (14,168 to 14,560 t)	2 shafts, Parsons turbines, 32 knots (59 km/h; 37 mph), 95,000 shp (71,000 kW)	29 April 1929	23 November 1931	Sunk, 29 March 1941
Pola	8 × 203 mm / 53 cal. guns	150 mm (5.9 in)	13,944 to 14,330 long tons (14,168 to 14,560 t)	2 shafts, Parsons turbines, 32 knots (59 km/h; 37 mph), 95,000 shp (71,000 kW)	17 March 1931	21 December 1932	Sunk, 29 March 1941
Gorizia	8 × 203 mm / 53 cal. guns	150 mm (5.9 in)	13,944 to 14,330 long tons (14,168 to 14,560 t)	2 shafts, Parsons turbines, 32 knots (59 km/h; 37 mph), 95,000 shp (71,000 kW)	17 March 1930	23 December 1932	Disabled by manned torpedoes in 1944, scrapped in 1949

== Bolzano ==
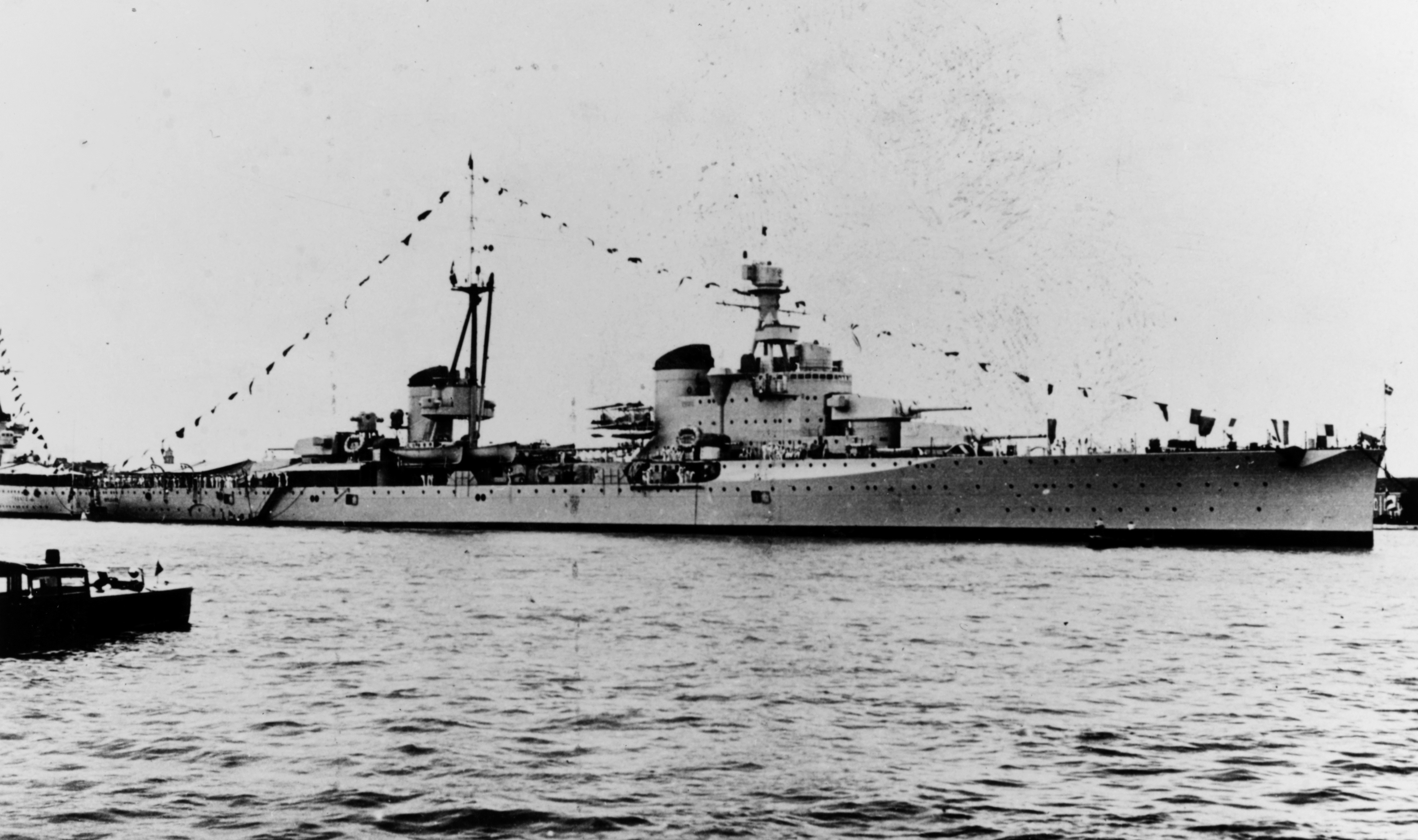
Bolzano during peacetime

By 1928, the Italian navy had begun rebuilding the Conte di Cavour-class battleships, and as a result, Pola was completed with an enlarged bridge so she could temporarily serve as the fleet flagship. She would then be unavailable for the planned three-ship cruiser divisions, and so the navy ordered a seventh cruiser to replace Pola. The design requirements for the new vessel reverted to those adopted for the Trentos, as the senior leaders of the navy continued to believe that speed was more important than armor. A series of changes were made to the basic Trento design, including the use of the longer 53-cal. guns adopted for the Zaras, new boilers, and a raised forecastle deck.

Like the rest of the Italian heavy cruisers, Bolzano was present at the major fleet actions during the first two years of the war in the Mediterranean. She was lightly damaged at Calabria and she engaged the British battlecruiser Renown at Cape Spartivento, though neither vessel scored any hits. While returning from a failed attempt to intercept a British convoy in August 1941, Bolzano was torpedoed by the British submarine HMS Triumph. Repairs were completed by November, but she was torpedoed again in August 1942 by the submarine HMS Unbroken, sustaining serious damage. She was still out of service in La Spezia, awaiting repairs, when Italy surrendered to the Allies on 3 September 1943; on 8–9 September, German troops occupied La Spezia. On the night of 21–22 June 1944, a team of British and Italian frogmen—Italy having re-entered the war on the side of the Allies—entered La Spezia using Chariot manned torpedoes to sink Bolzano and Gorizia to prevent the Germans from sinking them as blockships. They succeeded in sinking Bolzano but Gorizia remained afloat. Bolzano was ultimately raised in 1949 and thereafter broken up.

Summary of the Bolzano class
Ship	Armament	Armor	Displacement	Propulsion	Service		
Ship	Armament	Armor	Displacement	Propulsion	Laid down	Commissioned	Fate
Bolzano	8 × 203 mm / 53 cal. guns	70 mm	13,665 long tons (13,884 t)	4 shafts, Parsons turbines, 36 knots, 150,000 shp	11 June 1930	19 August 1933	Sunk, 21 June 1944

== See also ==
- List of protected cruisers of Italy
- List of battleships of Italy
