= HMS Grampus (N56) =

Submarine of the Royal Navy

Coordinates: 37°5′N 17°30′E

- HMS Grampus (N56)

History

United Kingdom
- Name: HMS Grampus
- Builder: Chatham Dockyard
- Laid down: 20 August 1934
- Launched: 25 February 1936
- Commissioned: 10 March 1937
- Fate: Sunk, 16 June 1940
- Badge

General characteristics
- Class & type: Grampus-class submarine
- Displacement: 1,810 long tons (1,840 t) (surfaced); 2,157 long tons (2,192 t) (submerged)
- Length: 293 ft (89 m)
- Beam: 25 ft 6 in (7.77 m)
- Draught: 16 ft 10 in (5.13 m)
- Installed power: 3,300 hp (2,500 kW) (diesel engines); 1,630 hp (1,220 kW) (electric motors)
- Propulsion: 2 × diesel engines; 2 × electric motors; 2 × shafts
- Speed: 15.5 kn (17.8 mph; 28.7 km/h) (surfaced); 8.75 kn (10.07 mph; 16.21 km/h) (submerged)
- Complement: 59
- Armament: 6 × 21 inch (533 mm) torpedo tubes (bow) (12 torpedoes), 1 × 4 in (100 mm) deck gun, 50 × mines

HMS Grampus (N56) was the lead ship of her class of mine-laying submarine of the Royal Navy. She was built at Chatham Dockyard and launched on 25 February 1936. She served in World War II off China before moving to the Mediterranean Sea.

On 16 June 1940, under the command of Lieutenant Commander C. A. Rowe, Grampus laid mines in the Syracuse and Augusta, Sicily area. She was seen by the Italian torpedo boat Circe, which was on anti-submarine patrol with Clio, Calliope, and Polluce. Within a very short time, Grampus was destroyed. Wreckage came to the surface along with air bubbles and oil. Polluce was credited with the kill. There were no survivors. Some sources give the date of this action as 24 June 1940.
