= Italian cruiser Campania =

Protected cruiser of the Italian Royal Navy

- Profile drawing of the Campania design

History

Italy
- Name: Campania
- Namesake: Region of Campania
- Laid down: 9 August 1913
- Launched: 23 July 1914
- Commissioned: 18 April 1917
- Stricken: 11 March 1937
- Fate: Sold for scrapping, 1937

General characteristics
- Class & type: Campania-class cruiser
- Displacement: Normal: 2,483 long tons (2,523 t); Full load: 3,187 long tons (3,238 t)
- Length: 83 m (272 ft 4 in)
- Beam: 12.7 m (41 ft 8 in)
- Draft: 5 m (16 ft 5 in)
- Installed power: 4 × fire-tube boilers; 5,001 ihp (3,729 kW)
- Propulsion: 2 × triple-expansion steam engines; 2 × screw propellers
- Speed: 15.7 kn (29.1 km/h; 18.1 mph)
- Range: 1,850 nmi (3,430 km; 2,130 mi) at 10 kn (19 km/h; 12 mph)
- Complement: 11 officers; 193 enlisted men
- Armament: 6 × 152 mm (6 in) guns; 2 × 76 mm (3 in) L40 guns; 3 × 76 mm anti-aircraft guns; 2 × 47 mm (1.9 in) guns; 2 × machine guns
- Armor: Deck: 25 mm (0.98 in); Conning tower: 50 mm (2 in)

Campania was a small protected cruiser built for the Italian Regia Marina (Royal Navy) in the 1910s. She was the lead ship of the Campania class, which included one other ship, Basilicata. Designed for colonial service, the ship was armed with a comparatively heavy armament on a small hull, with a long cruising radius emphasized over high speed. Commissioned into service in early 1917, Campania spent the first few years of her career in Italy's colonies, before being classified as a gunboat in 1921 and a training ship in 1932. This service lasted until 1937 when she was sold for scrapping.

== Design ==
Campania was 83 meters (272 ft) long overall and had a beam of 12.7 m (42 ft) and a draft of 5 m (16 ft). She displaced 2,483 long tons (2,523 t) normally and up to 3,187 long tons (3,238 t) at full load. Her propulsion system consisted of a pair of vertical triple-expansion steam engines each driving a single screw propeller. Steam was supplied by four coal-fired, cylindrical fire-tube boilers that were vented into a single funnel. Her engines were rated at 5,001 indicated horsepower (3,729 kW) and produced a top speed of 15.7 knots (29.1 km/h; 18.1 mph). The ship had a cruising radius of about 1,850 nautical miles (3,430 km; 2,130 mi) at a speed of 10 knots (19 km/h; 12 mph). She had a crew of 11 officers and 193 enlisted men.

Campania was armed with a main battery of six 152 mm (6 in) L/40 guns mounted singly; one was placed on the forecastle, one at the stern, and two on each broadside in sponsons on the main deck. She was also equipped with two 76 mm (3 in) L40 guns, three 76 mm L/40 guns in anti-aircraft mountings, two 47 mm (1.9 in) guns, and a pair of machine guns. The ship was only lightly armored, with a 25 mm (0.98 in) thick deck, and 50 mm (2 in) thick plating on her conning tower.

== Service history ==
Campania was built by the Castellammare shipyard, where her keel was laid on 9 August 1913, the same day as Basilicata. The ships were small enough that they could be built on the same slipway. They were launched less than a year later on 23 July 1914. After fitting-out work was completed, Campania was commissioned on 18 May 1917, four months before her sister ship.

Designed as a colonial cruiser in the mold of the cruiser Calabria, Campania spent the first several years of her career in Italy's African colonies, including Italian Libya. On 1 July 1921, the ship was reclassified as a gunboat and two of her 152 mm guns were removed during reconstruction work that lasted until 1922. Starting in 1932 she served as a school ship for naval cadets. She was capable of carrying 100 cadets, along with their officers, petty officers, and support staff. She remained in this role until she was stricken from the naval register on 11 March 1937 and sold for scrapping.
