= Italian cruiser Basilicata =

Protected cruiser of the Italian Royal Navy

- Profile drawing of the Campania design

History

Italy
- Name: Basilicata
- Namesake: Region of Basilicata
- Builder: Regio Cantiere di Castellammare di Stabia
- Laid down: 9 August 1913
- Launched: 23 July 1914
- Commissioned: 1 August 1917
- Fate: Sunk by boiler explosion, 13 August 1919, raised and scrapped

General characteristics
- Class & type: Campania-class cruiser
- Displacement: Normal: 2,483 long tons (2,523 t); Full load: 3,187 long tons (3,238 t)
- Length: 83 m (272 ft 4 in)
- Beam: 12.7 m (41 ft 8 in)
- Draft: 5 m (16 ft 5 in)
- Installed power: 4 × fire-tube boilers; 4,129 ihp (3,079 kW)
- Propulsion: 2 × triple-expansion steam engines; 2 × screw propellers
- Speed: 15.5 knots (28.7 km/h; 17.8 mph)
- Range: 1,850 nmi (3,430 km; 2,130 mi) at 10 knots (19 km/h; 12 mph)
- Complement: 11 officers; 193 enlisted men
- Armament: 6 × 152 mm (6 in) guns; 2 × 76 mm (3 in) L40 guns; 3 × 76 mm anti-aircraft guns; 2 × 47 mm (1.9 in) guns; 2 × machine guns
- Armor: Deck: 25 mm (0.98 in); Conning tower: 50 mm (2 in)

Basilicata was a small protected cruiser built for the Italian Regia Marina (Royal Navy) in the 1910s. She was the second and final member of the Campania class, along with the lead ship Campania. The Campania-class cruisers were intended for service in Italy's colonies, and so were given a heavy armament and designed to emphasize long cruising range over high speed. Basilicata's career was cut short in mid-1919 when one of her boilers exploded and sank her while in Tewfik, Egypt. The ship was raised in 1920 but deemed not worth repairing; she was sold for scrapping in July 1921.

== Design ==
Basilicata was 83 meters (272 ft) long overall and had a beam of 12.7 m (42 ft) and a draft of 5 m (16 ft). She displaced 2,483 long tons (2,523 t) normally and up to 3,187 long tons (3,238 t) at full load. Her propulsion system consisted of a pair of vertical triple-expansion steam engines each driving a single screw propeller. Steam was supplied by four coal-fired, cylindrical fire-tube boilers that were vented into a single funnel. Her engines were rated at 4,129 indicated horsepower (3,079 kW) and produced a top speed of 15.5 knots (28.7 km/h; 17.8 mph). The ship had a cruising radius of about 1,850 nautical miles (3,430 km; 2,130 mi) at a speed of 10 knots (19 km/h; 12 mph). She had a crew of 11 officers and 193 enlisted men.

Basilicata was armed with a main battery of six 152 mm (6 in) L/40 guns mounted singly; one was placed on the forecastle, one at the stern, and two on each broadside in sponsons on the main deck. She was also equipped with two 76 mm (3 in) L40 guns, three 76 mm L/40 guns in anti-aircraft mountings, two 47 mm (1.9 in) guns, and a pair of machine guns. The ship was only lightly armored, with a 25 mm (0.98 in) thick deck, and 50 mm (2 in) thick plating on her conning tower.

== Service history ==
Basilicata was laid down at the Castellammare shipyard on 9 August 1913, the same day as Campania. Both ships were built on the same slipway. They were launched less than a year later on 23 July 1914. Fitting-out work proceeded more slowly on Basilicata, and she was completed on 1 August 1917, four months after her sister ship. After completion, Basilicata was stationed in Italian Libya.

On 13 August 1919, while moored in Tewfik at the southern end of the Suez Canal, one of Basilicata's boilers exploded, which sank the ship. Salvage operations began thereafter, and on 12 September 1920 after three days of work, the ship was refloated. The Regia Marina decided that repairing the ship was not worth the cost, and so on 1 July 1921 she was sold to ship breakers in Suez.
