= Campania-class cruiser =

Protected cruiser class of the Italian Royal Navy

- Profile drawing of the Campania design

Class overview
- Name: Campania class
- Operators: Regia Marina
- Preceded by: Nino Bixio class
- Succeeded by: None
- Built: 1913–1917
- In commission: 1917–1937
- Completed: 2
- Lost: 1
- Scrapped: 1

General characteristics
- Type: Protected cruiser
- Displacement: Normal: 2,483 long tons (2,523 t); Full load: 3,187 long tons (3,238 t)
- Length: 83 m (272 ft 4 in)
- Beam: 12.7 m (41 ft 8 in)
- Draft: 5 m (16 ft 5 in)
- Installed power: 4 × fire-tube boilers; 4,129 to 5,001 ihp (3,079 to 3,729 kW)
- Propulsion: 2 × triple-expansion steam engines; 2 × screw propellers
- Speed: 15.5 to 15.7 kn (28.7 to 29.1 km/h; 17.8 to 18.1 mph)
- Range: 1,850 nmi (3,430 km; 2,130 mi) at 10 kn (19 km/h; 12 mph)
- Complement: 11 officers; 193 enlisted men
- Armament: 6 × 152 mm (6 in) guns; 2 × 76 mm (3 in) L40 guns; 3 × 76 mm anti-aircraft guns; 2 × 47 mm (1.9 in) guns; 2 × machine guns
- Armor: Deck: 25 mm (0.98 in); Conning tower: 50 mm (2 in)

The Campania class was a pair of small protected cruisers built for the Italian Regia Marina (Royal Navy) in the 1910s. The two ships, Campania and Basilicata, were the last ships of that type built by the 'Regia Marina, as it had been superseded by more effective light cruisers. The Campania class was designed for use in Italy's overseas colonies, on the model of the old Calabria. Neither ship had a particularly eventful career. Basilicata was destroyed by a boiler explosion in 1919, two years after entering service, and was subsequently raised and scrapped. Campania remained in service for significantly longer, but she did not see action and ended her career as a training ship before being scrapped in 1937.

== Design ==
The ships of the Campania class were designed for use in Italy's overseas colonies and to serve as training ships for naval cadets. The design was based on the old cruiser Calabria, which had also been built as a colonial cruiser. They were small ships, at 76.8 meters (252 ft) long at the waterline and 83 m (272 ft 4 in) long overall. They had a beam of 12.7 m (41 ft 8 in) and a draft of 5 m (16 ft 5 in). They displaced 2,483 long tons (2,483 long tons) normally and up to 3,187 long tons (3,187 long tons) at full load. The ships were fitted with a pair of pole masts equipped with spotting tops. They had a crew of 11 officers and 193 enlisted men, and were also capable of carrying 100 cadets, along with their officers, petty officers, staff, and equipment.

Their propulsion system consisted of a pair of vertical triple-expansion steam engines each driving a single screw propeller, with steam supplied by four coal-fired, cylindrical fire-tube boilers. The boilers were trunked into a single funnel amidships. Campania's engines were rated at 5,001 indicated horsepower (3,729 kW) and produced a top speed of 15.7 knots (29.1 km/h; 18.1 mph), while Basilicata's produced only 4,129 ihp (3,079 kW) and 15.5 kn (28.7 km/h; 17.8 mph). The ships had a cruising radius of about 1,850 nautical miles (3,430 km; 2,130 mi) at a speed of 10 knots (19 km/h; 12 mph).

Campania and Basilicata were armed with a main battery of six 152 mm (6 in) 40-caliber (cal.) guns mounted singly; one was placed on the forecastle, one at the stern, and two on each broadside in sponsons on the main deck. These weapons, which were built-up guns, could fire armor-piercing and high-explosive shells at a muzzle velocity of 690 meters per second (2,280 ft/s). They were also equipped with two Ansaldo 76 mm (3 in) 40-cal. guns in low-angle mounts and three 76 mm 40-cal. guns in high-angle anti-aircraft mountings; they fired a 6-kilogram (13 lb) shell at a muzzle velocity of 680 meters per second (2,200 ft/s). They also carried several small guns, including two 47 mm (1.9 in) guns manufactured by Vickers and a pair of machine guns. The ships were only lightly armored, with a 25 mm (0.98 in) thick deck, and 50 mm (2 in) thick plating on her conning tower.

== Ships ==
Campania and Basilicata were small enough that they could be built on the same slipway, and they were launched on the same day. They were the last protected cruisers to be built by the Regia Marina. This was partly a result of the outbreak of World War I during the construction of these ships, and the resulting shortage of steel as resources were dedicated to the construction of smaller scouts, destroyers, and submarines, which proved to be more useful in the confined waters of the Adriatic Sea. After the war, Italy received several light cruisers as war prizes from Germany and Austria-Hungary, and these ships formed the backbone of the Italian reconnaissance force in the immediate post-war period.

Construction data
Name	Builder	Laid down	Launched	Commissioned
Campania	Castellammare	9 August 1913	23 July 1914	18 April 1917
Basilicata	Castellammare	9 August 1913	23 July 1914	1 August 1917

== Service history ==
Both ships served abroad in the first few years of their active service in Italian Libya, and had uneventful careers. Basilicata's career was cut short on 13 August 1919, when one of her boilers exploded while she was moored in Tewfik at the southern end of the Suez Canal. The explosion sank the ship; she was raised in September 1920 but was deemed not worth repairing, and so she was sold for scrap in July 1921. Campania was reclassified as a gunboat that year and had two of her 152 mm guns removed. She became a full-time training ship in 1932, a role in which she served until March 1937, when she was stricken from the naval register and sold for scrap.
