= NMS Constanța =

Romanian submarine tender

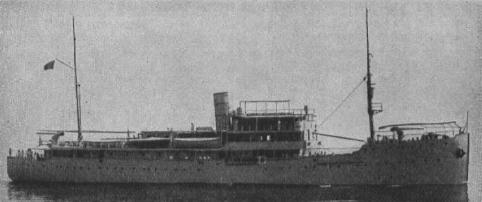
- Constanța at sea

History

Romania
- Name: Constanța
- Builder: Quarnaro Shipyard, Fiume. Italy
- Laid down: 1927
- Completed: 1931
- Commissioned: 1931
- Out of service: 1944
- Fate: Captured by the Soviet Union

Soviet Union
- Name: Bug (later PKZ-87)
- Commissioned: 1944
- Out of service: 1977
- Fate: Scrapped

Service record
- Commanders: Victor Voinescu
- Victories: 1 aircraft destroyed

General characteristics (according to Jane's)
- Type: Submarine tender
- Displacement: 1,329 tons (standard); 2,300 tons (full load)
- Length: 77.8 m (255 ft 3 in)
- Beam: 11.2 m (36 ft 9 in)
- Draft: 4 m (13 ft 1 in)
- Propulsion: 2 diesel engines, 2 shafts
- Speed: 13 knots (24 km/h; 15 mph)
- Range: 10,000 nmi (19,000 km; 12,000 mi)
- Armament: 2 x 102 mm naval guns; 2 × 40 mm AA guns

NMS Constanța was a submarine tender of the Romanian Navy. She was commissioned in 1931 and fought in the Second World War, being scrapped in 1977.

== Construction and specifications ==
Constanța was one of the earliest purpose-built submarine tenders. She was commissioned in 1931, ahead of Germany's first purpose-built submarine tender, Saar. Constanța was laid down in August 1927 at the Italian Quarnaro Shipyard in Fiume, being completed in 1931. She measured 77.8 meters in length, having a beam of 11.2 meters and a draught of 4 meters. She was fitted with torpedo storing and loading facilities, engineering workshops, and submarine salvage and signalling facilities. Power plant consisted of two diesel engines powering two shafts, giving her a top speed of 13 knots. Her armament consisted of two 102 mm guns and two 40 mm anti-aircraft guns. She displaced 1,329 tons standard with a full load displacement of 2,300 tons, having a range of over 10,000 nautical miles.

== World War II ==
During World War II, according to Romanian sources, her armament was modified: the two 102 mm guns were replaced by two 76 mm Armstrong naval/AA guns, the two 40 mm Bofors guns were replaced by two 20 mm anti-aircraft guns and two twin 13 mm machine guns were also fitted.

At the start of Operation Barbarossa in June 1941, Constanța was the flagship of the Grupul submarine și vedete torpiloare (The submarines and motor torpedo boats group), the only formation of the Romanian Navy designated for offensive operations. The group also comprised the submarine Delfinul and three motor torpedo boats of the Vospers type (Viscolul, Viforul and Vijelia). She was commanded by Lieutenant-Commander Victor Voinescu, who was also the commander of the entire group.

On 3 August 1941, one of her 76 mm guns shot down 1 Soviet aircraft. During May and June 1942, she took part in amphibious landing drills. In the summer of 1944, she was fitted with an anti-magnetic belt.

On 28 August 1944, she was captured by Soviet forces and, unlike most other warships of the Romanian Navy, was never returned. She was commissioned on 5 September 1944, and on 14 September enlisted in Black Sea Fleet. On 20 October 1944 she was renamed Bug (Буг, for a river). On 4 September 1973 she was hulked and designated PKZ-87 (ПКЗ-87) until being written off on 16 April 1977 and scrapped in 1978 in Sevastopol.
