= Spica-class torpedo boat (Italy) =

Class of Italian torpedo boats

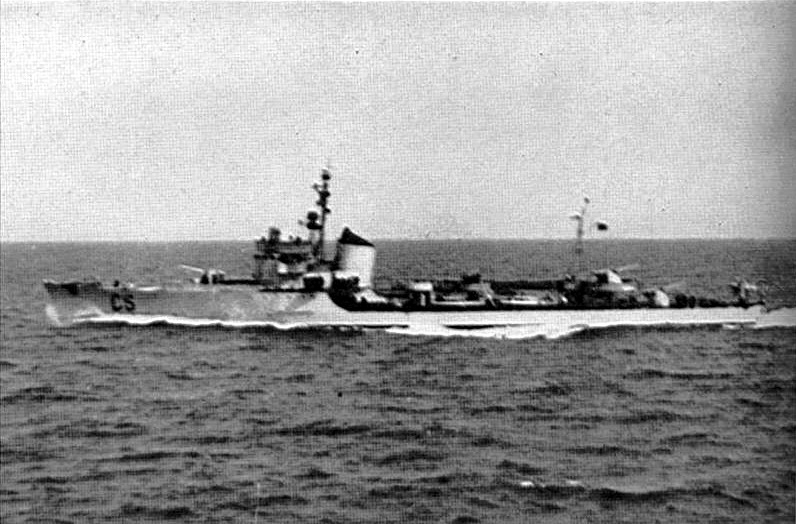
- Torpedo boat Cassiopea

Class overview
- Operators: Regia Marina; Swedish Navy; Italian Navy
- Preceded by: Curtatone class
- Succeeded by: Ariete class
- Built: 1934–1937
- In service: 1935–1964
- Completed: 32
- Lost: 21 to Italian armistice (23)
- Retired: 8

General characteristics
- Type: Torpedo boat
- Displacement: 795 long tons (808 t) standard; 1,020 long tons (1,040 t) full load
- Length: 81.4–65.72 m (267 ft 1 in – 215 ft 7 in) oa
- Beam: 8.1 m (26 ft 7 in)
- Draught: 2.55 m (8 ft 4 in)
- Installed power: 19,000 hp (14,000 kW)
- Propulsion: 2 boilers, 2 steam turbines, 2 shafts
- Speed: 34 kn (63 km/h; 39 mph)
- Complement: 6–9 officers; 100 crew
- Sensors & processing systems: Sonar and hydrophones
- Armament: 3 × 100 mm 100/47 dual-purpose guns; 8 × 13.2 mm anti-aircraft machine guns in 4 × twin mounts, later replaced by: 6–11 × 20 mm Breda 20/65 mod. 35 AA guns; 4 × 450 mm torpedo tubes (single or twin mounts; various permutations); Up to 20 mines

The Spica class was a class of torpedo boats of the Regia Marina (Royal Italian Navy) during World War II. These ships were built as a result of a clause in the Washington Naval Treaty, that ships of less than 600 long tons (610 t) could be built in unlimited numbers. Thirty-two ships were built between 1934 and 1937, thirty of which entered service with Italy.

Called torpedo boats due to their smaller displacement, the Spica class had armament similar to destroyers (influenced by the Maestrale-class destroyer) and were intended for anti-submarine operations but also had to fight aircraft and surface ships. Twenty-three vessels were lost during the war, two were sold to the Swedish Navy in 1940. The class was called destroyers until 1953 and then renamed corvettes.

== Design ==
=== Specifications ===
The London Naval Treaty (1930) put no limit on vessels of 600 LT or less. Design work started in 1932 supervised by the general engineer Gustavo Bozzoni. Two prototypes, Spica and Astore, were completed in 1935 and sold to the Swedish Navy. The hull was 81.4–65.72 m (267 ft 1 in – 215 ft 7 in) long, the beam was 8.1 m (27 ft), the draught was 2.55 m (8 ft 4 in) and the ships had 19,000 hp (14,000 kW) from 2-shaft geared turbines Displacement was around 789.31–799.29 tonnes (776.84–786.67 long tons; 870.07–881.07 short tons) and 982–1,054.665 t (966.491–1,038.008 long tons; 1,082.470–1,162.569 short tons) standard rather than the 600 t (590 long tons; 660 short tons) permitted by the treaty. There was a complement of 6 to 9 officers and 110 crew.

=== Armament ===
The gun armament consisted of three 100 mm (4 in)/47 caliber dual-purpose guns in single mountings in 'A', 'X', and 'Y' positions and three or four twin 13.2 mm (0.52 in) anti-aircraft machine guns, later replaced by 6 to 11 Breda 20/65 modello 35 20 mm cannon in various configurations. Lupo replaced her eight machine guns by 1941 with three twin 20 mm guns; two abreast the bridge and one between the funnel and second main gun, leaving the former machine-gun platform immediately abaft the funnel vacant. The ships had minelaying equipment and room for twenty mines.

They also carried four 450 mm (18 in) torpedo tubes; two tubes for each side in the first group, with later groups having varying configurations including a centreline twin- and two single-beam mounts, before settling on two centreline twin mounts in the last vessels. Some earlier ships were reportedly refitted with the all-centreline arrangement during the war. Twenty-one Spica-class torpedo boats were lost during the war, three mined by the submarine mine-layer HMS Rorqual, three sunk by submarines, seven by aircraft, seven by ships and one by a collision.

=== Construction batches ===
Six ships of the Climene group, Canopo, Cassiopea, Castore, Centauro, Cigno and Climene entered service from 1936 to 1937. Eight more Spica-class ships of the 'Perseo group comprised Aldebaran, Altair, Andromeda and Antares, Perseo, Sagittario, Sirio and Vega. The Alcione group was a batch of sixteen ships, Alcione, Airone, Aretusa, Ariel, Calliope, Calipso, Clio, Circe, Libra, Lince, Lira, Lupo, Pallade, Partenope, Pleiadi and Polluce that went into service in 1938. The Alcione ships carried two twin torpedo-tubes on the centre line, except for Libra, Lince, Lira, Lupo that had four single tubes until 1941, by when the four single tubes had been replaced with two twin tubes.

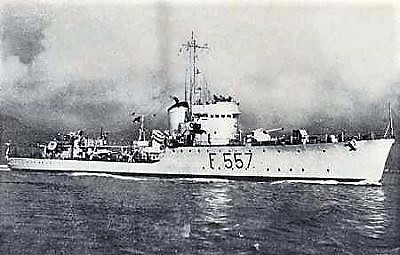
Torpedo boat Sagittario

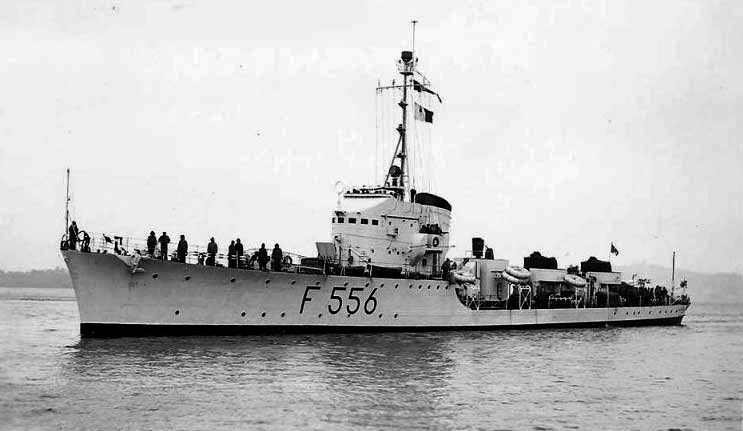
Aretusa (F 556) in service with the Marina Militare in the 1950s

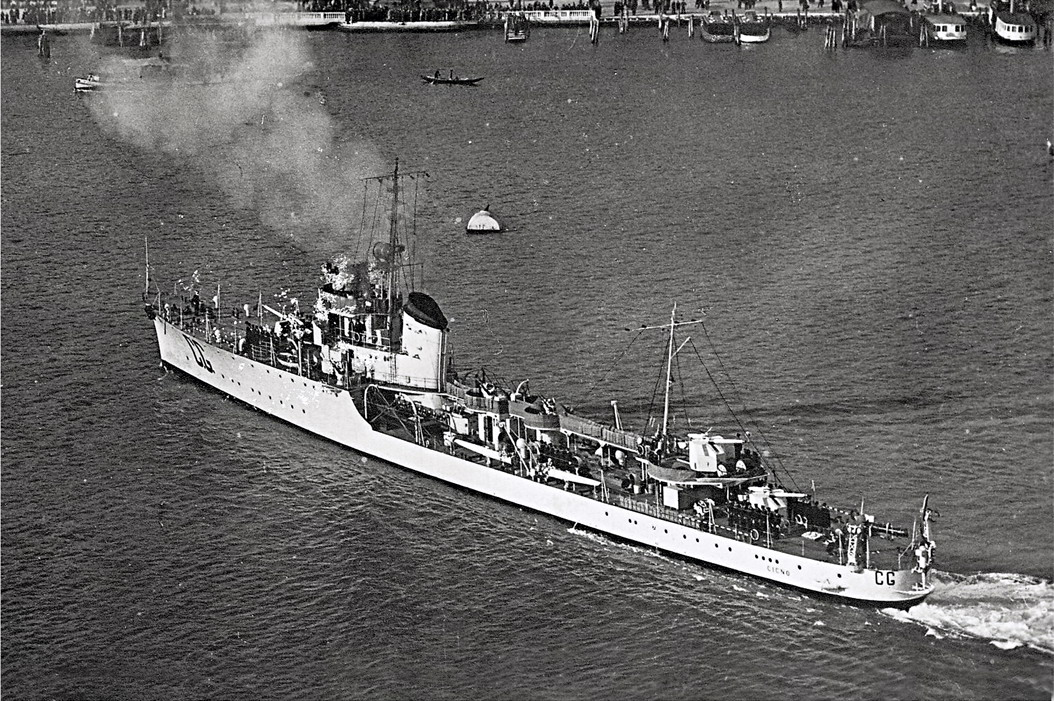
Torpedo boat Cigno

== Ships ==
Construction data and service histories
Ship	Hull ltr.s	Builder	Completed	Operational history
Airone	AO	Ansaldo, Sestri Ponente	10 May 1938	Sunk 12 October 1940 in the Battle of Cape Passero by cruiser HMS Ajax. She had three hits from her main guns on the British cruiser before being disabled, 59 men lwere ost. Ajax hit by seven shells that destroyed one of her whalers, caused severe damage to the bridge and radar installation and 35 casualties, including 13 killed.
Alcione	AC	Ansaldo, Sestri Ponente	10 May 1938	Sunk 11 December 1941 by submarine HMS Truant.
Aldebaran	AL	Ansaldo, Sestri Ponente	6 December 1936	Sunk 20 October 1941 in the Saronic Gulf, by mines laid by the mine-laying submarine HMS Rorqual.
Altair	AT	Ansaldo, Sestri Ponente	23 December 1936	Sunk 20 October 1941 in the Saronic Gulf, by mines laid by submarine mine-layer HMS Rorqual.
Andromeda	AD	Ansaldo, Sestri Ponente	6 December 1936	Sunk 17 March 1941 at Valona, Albania, by British torpedo-bombers.
Antares	AN	Ansaldo, Sestri Ponente	23 December 1936	Sank Greek submarine Protefs (sometimes Proteus) by ramming 40 nmi (74 km; 46 mi) east of Brindisi, 29 December 1940. Sunk 28 March 1943 at Livorno by USAAF bombers.
Aretusa	AU	Ansaldo, Sestri Ponente	1 July 1938	On 2 December 1942, while escorting a three-ship convoy, Aretusa shot down one of three Albacores that torpedoed the merchant ships south of Kerkennah Islands. One of the ships in the convoy was sunk by the aircraft and Lupo was sunk by British destroyers while recovering survivors at night. The remaining ships reached their destination next morning. The ship was severely damaged by bombing on 13 April 1943 and repaired a few months later. Survived the war and served in the Marina Militare. Decommissioned 1 August 1958.
Ariel	AE	Ansaldo, Sestri Ponente	1 July 1938	Sunk 12 October 1940 in the Battle of Cape Passero by British cruiser HMS Ajax, with the loss of 98 men.
Astore	AS	BSN, Naples (Note: Bacini e Scali Napoletani, Naples)	30 May 1935	Sold to Sweden as HSwMS Remus in 1940. Decommissioned 1958.
Calipso	CI	Ansaldo, Sestri Ponente	16 November 1938	Sunk 5 December 1940, by mines from submarine mine-layer HMS Rorqual east of Tripoli.
Calliope	CP	Ansaldo, Sestri Ponente	28 October 1938	To September 1943, escorted 117 convoys and took part in 21 combats steaming 77,500 nmi (143,500 km; 89,200 mi). Shot down six British aircraft on convoy escort to Libya. Survived the war and served in the post war Marina Militare. Decommissioned 1 August 1958.
Canopo	CA	CT, Riva Trigoso (Note: Cantieri del Tirreno, Riva Trigoso)	31 March 1937	Sunk 3 May 1941 by British bombers at Tripoli.
Cassiopea	CS	CT, Riva Trigoso	26 April 1937	Sank HMS Pakenham in the Battle of the Cigno Convoy, south-east of Marettimo island, 16 April 1943, escorting a merchant ship to Tunis. Severely damaged, towed by Climene. Survived the war and served in the post war Marina Militare. Decommissioned 1959.
Castore	CT	CNR, Ancona (Note: Cantieri Navali Riuniti, Ancona)	16 January 1937	On 13 January 1942, she led a convoy from Tripoli to Taranto that outmanoeuvred British destroyers HMS Jaguar, Lance, Lively and Zulu. The convoy, with Monginevro and Monviso, had been spotted and attacked by Swordfish of 830 Squadron. Castore defeated British motor boats and small vessels attempting to land at Tobruk in Operation Agreement. She later rounded up a number of British survivors and small amphibious craft from the sea. Sunk 2 June 1943 by destroyers HMS Jervis and Vasilissa Olga in the Battle of the Messina Convoy while defending a small convoy of two coasters, which reached their destination.
Centauro	CO	CNR, Ancona	16 June 1936	Sunk 4 November 1942, bombed in Benghazi harbour.
Cigno	CG	CNR, Ancona	15 March 1937	Part of the screen of destroyers and torpedo boats escorting a four-freighter convoy to Tripoli on 26 May 1941. Two Blenheims were shot down. Cigno rescued hundreds of survivors after the Battle of Cape Bon, where she dodged four torpedoes launched by the Dutch destroyer HNLMS Isaac Sweers. Sunk in the Battle of the Cigno Convoy, 16 April 1943, south-east of Marettimo Island, by HMS Paladin and HMS Pakenham, while escorting a transport ship to Tunis; Pakenham was repeatedly hit by Cigno and Cassiopea and was scuttled.
Circe	CC	Ansaldo, Sestri Ponente	4 October 1938	Attempted (with Vega) to ambush a British convoy south of Pantelleria in January 1941. Vega was sunk and the cruiser HMS Bonaventure was damaged. The destroyer HMS Gallant hit a mine and was damaged beyond repair in the aftermath. Sank submarines HMS Grampus, HMS Union, HMS P38 and HMS Tempest. Sunk by collision 27 November 1942.
Climene	CE	CNR, Ancona	24 April 1936	She took part in the shooting down of three Beaufort torpedo-bombers and a Beaufighter while escorting a convoy, 20–21 August 1942. Climene was part of the escorting force that sank submarine HMS Triton on 24 April 1943. Sunk 28 April 1943 by submarine HMS Unshaken.
Clio	CL	Ansaldo, Sestri Ponente	2 October 1938	Clio shot down a Swordfish torpedo bomber from HMS Illustrious while escorting a four ship convoy off Sfax on 21 December 1940. (Note: Also attributed to Vega, escorting a small convoy further south attacked by nine aircraft.) Participated in the Battle of Skerki Bank, on 2 December 1942. Survived the war and served in the post-war Marina Militare. Decommissioned 1959.
Libra	LB	CNQ, Fiume (Note: Cantieri Navali del Quarnaro, Fiume)	19 January 1939	Assisted Lupo in the attack on Convoy AN 14 on the night of 31 January 1941 in the Kasos Strait. On 13 March 1943, while escorting a four-ship convoy, Libra participated in the hunt of submarine HMS Thetis (HMS Thunderbolt), carrying out seven depth charge attacks. The submarine was sunk by the corvette Cicogna the following day. Survived the war and served in the post war Marina Militare. Decommissioned 1964.
Lince	LC	CNQ, Fiume	1 April 1938	Along with Lupo, she landed troops during Operation Abstention, the re-conquest of Kastelorizo, in February 1941. Grounded and later torpedoed and destroyed on 28 August 1943 by submarine HMS Ultor.
Lira	LR	CNQ, Fiume	1 January 1938	Scuttled 9 September 1943, recovered by the Germans, renamed TA49, sunk by bombing 4 November 1944.
Lupo	LP/LU (Note: Relettered LU in 1938)	CNQ, Fiume	28 February 1938	Along with Libra, torpedoed the British tanker Desmoulea (8,120 GRT) in the Kasos straits on 31 January 1941 at 35°33′32″N 25°34′14″E disabling her for the rest of the war. The tanker was part of Convoy AN 14 and had departed Alexandria for Piraeus. Captained by Francesco Mimbelli during Operation Abstention, the reconquest of Kastelorizo and the Battle of Crete, where she survived a battle against three cruisers and five destroyers, saving half of a small ships convoy. Sunk 2 December 1942 by destroyers HMS Jervis, Javelin, Janus and Kelvin and torpedo bombers, while rescuing survivors from the Italian cargo ship Veloce, en route to Tripoli.
Pallade	PD	BSN, Naples	5 October 1938	Sunk 5 August 1943 by air attack in Naples.
Partenope	PN	BSN, Naples	26 November 1938	Shot down two Blenheims while escorting two steamers from Tripoli to Benghazi on 11 July 1941; damaged by a mine off Preveza on 26 July 1943. Scuttled in dry dock at Naples during Four days of Naples on 11 September 1943 when German forces occupied the city.
Perseo	PS	CNQ, Fiume	1 February 1936	Sunk 4 May 1943 off Cape Bon by HMS Nubian, Petard and Paladin, in the Battle of the Campobasso Convoy escorting the freighter Campobasso, also sunk in this action. Convoy, escort by the Ciclone-class torpedo boat Tifone, Perseo and Campobasso sunk but Tifone was able to outrun the British destroyers and reached Tunis.
Pleiadi	PL	BSN, Naples	4 July 1938	Wrecked on 31 May 1941 outside Tripoli harbour after a fire on board, definitively lost on 14 October 1941 to bombing while being refloated.
Polluce	PC	BSN, Naples	8 August 1938	Sank submarine HMS Grampus in June 1940, in company with Circe, Clio and Calliope. Sunk by torpedo bombers, 4 September 1942.
Sagittario	SG	CNQ, Fiume	8 October 1936	Defended a German convoy of caïques during the Battle of Crete against three British cruisers and four destroyers, claimed minor damage to the destroyer HMS Kingston. Sank British MGB 639 off Tunis, on 28 April 1943 whilst escorting a steamer off Kelibia. Served in the Marina Militare, decommissioned 1964.
Sirio	SI	CNQ, Fiume	1 March 1936	First Italian unit to spot the enemy in the Battle of Cape Spartivento; on 16 February 1943 Sirio led the escort of a four-ship convoy that detected by sonar and fought off MTB-77, MTB-82 and MTB-62 south of Marettimo. Served in the Marina Militare. Decommissioned 1959.
Spica	SP	BSN, Naples	30 May 1935	Sold to Sweden as HSwMS Romulus in 1940. Decommissioned 1958.
Vega	VG	CNQ, Fiume	12 October 1936	Shot down a Swordfish from Illustrious off Sfax on 21 December 1940 after two steamers she was escorting were torpedoed and sunk. (Note: Also claimed by Clio, that protected a convoy against a single-aircraft attack further north.) Sunk by destroyer Hereward 10 January 1941 in the Strait of Sicily while attempting to ambush a British convoy to Malta.

Notes to table

== See also ==
- Ariete-class torpedo boat, an enlarged version of the class

== Bibliography ==
- Andò, Elio; Bagnasco, Erminio (1976). La guerra navale in Mediterraneo [The Naval War in the Mediterranean]. Milano: Intergest. OCLC 800072688.
- Biagini, Antonello; Frattolillo, Fernando (1989). Diario storico del Comando Supremo: 1.1.1941 – 30.4.1941 [Diary of the Supreme Command] (in Italian). Rome: Ufficio Storico della Marina Militare. OCLC 885562556.
- Borgenstam, Curt; Insulander, Per & Kaudern, Gösta (1989). Jagare: med Svenska flottans jagare under 80 år [Destroyers: Swedish Navy Destroyers under 80 years] (in Swedish). Västra Frölunda: Marinlitteratur. ISBN 978-9-19-707004-1.
- Brown, David (1995) [1990]. Warship losses of World War Two. London: Arms and Armour Press. ISBN 978-0-85409-278-9.
- Cull, Brian; Malizia, Nicola; Shores, Christopher (1999). Malta: The Hurricane Years. Grub Street. ISBN 978-0-94-881706-9.
- Fraccaroli, Aldo (1974) [1968]. Italian Warships of World War II. London: Ian Allan. OCLC 464456943.
- Giorgerini, Giorgio (2001). La guerra italiana sul mare. La Marina tra vittoria e sconfitta 1940–1943 [The Italian War at Sea: The Navy between Victory and Defeat 1940–1943] (in Italian). Milano: Mondadori. ISBN 978-8-80-440581-8.
- Giorgerini, Giorgio (2002). La guerra italiana sul mare. La Marina tra vittoria e sconfitta 1940–1943 [The Italian War at Sea: The Navy between Victory and Defeat 1940–1943] (in Italian). Milano: Mondadori. ISBN 978-8-80-450150-3.
- Greene, Jack; Massignani, Alessandro (1998). The Naval War in the Mediterranean, 1940–1943. London: Chatham Publishing. ISBN 978-1-88-511961-2.
- Greentree, David (2016). British Submarine vs. Italian Torpedo Boat, Mediterranean 1940–43. Duel (No.74) (ePub repr. Bloomsbury, London ed.). Oxford: Osprey. ISBN 978-1-4728-1414-2.
- H.M. Ships Damaged or Sunk by Enemy Action, 1939–1945. Britain: Admiralty. 1952. OCLC 220864603.
- Heden, Karl Erik (2006). Sunken Ships, World War II: U.S. Naval Chronology Including Submarine Losses of the United States, England, Germany, Japan, Italy. Branden Books. ISBN 978-0-8283-2118-1.
- Jordan, Roger W. (2006) [1999]. The World's Merchant Fleets 1939: The Particulars and Wartime Fates of 6,000 Ships (2nd ed.). London: Chatham/Lionel Leventhal. ISBN 978-1-86176-293-1.
- Mattesini, Francesco (1998). L'operazione Gaudo e lo scontro notturno di Matapan [Operation Gaudo and the Night Clash of Matapan] (in Italian). Rome: Ufficio Storico della Marina Militare. OCLC 45375070.
- O'Hara, Vincent P. (2009). Struggle for the Middle Sea: The Great Navies at War in the Mediterranean Theater, 1940–1945. Annapolis, MD: Naval Institute Press. ISBN 978-1-59114-648-3.
- "R. Torpediniera Calliope". digilander.libero.it/carandin.
- Roberti, Vero (1977). Uno contro sei: Il contributo della Marina italiana alla conquista di Creta [One Against Six: The Contribution of the Italian Navy to the Conquest of Crete] (in Italian). Milano: Mursia. OCLC 4777680.
- Rohwer, Jürgen; Hümmelchen, Gerhard (2005) [1972]. Chronology of the War at Sea, 1939–1945: The Naval History of World War Two (3rd rev. ed.). London: Chatham Publishing. ISBN 1-86176-257-7.
- Sadkovich, James (1994). The Italian Navy in World War II. Westport: Greenwood Press. ISBN 0-313-28797-X.
- Shores, Christopher; Cull, Brian; Malizia, Nicola (1987). Air War For Yugoslavia, Greece, and Crete 1940–41. London: Grub Street. ISBN 0-948817-07-0.
- Shores, Christopher; Cull, Brian; Malizia, Nicola (1991). Malta: The Spitfire Year 1942. London: Grub Street. ISBN 0-948817-16-X.
- Woodman, Richard (2000). Malta Convoys, 1940–1943. London: Jack Murray. ISBN 0-7195-5753-4.
