= Sirio-class torpedo boat =

Type of Italian warship

Sirio class
Class overview
- Builders: Schichau-Werke, Elbing
- Operators: Regia Marina
- Preceded by: Pellicano
- Succeeded by: Pegaso class
- Built: 1904–1906
- In commission: 1905–1923
- Completed: 6
- Lost: 3
- Retired: 3

General characteristics
- Type: High-seas Torpedo boat
- Displacement: 210 t (210 long tons)
- Length: 51.00 m (167 ft 4 in) pp; 51.07 m (167 ft 7 in) oa
- Beam: 6.0 m (19 ft 8 in)
- Draught: 1.6 m (5 ft 3 in)
- Propulsion: 2 × vertical triple-expansion steam engines; 2 coal-fired Schultz-Thornycroft boilers; 3,000 ihp (2,200 kW)
- Speed: 25 kn (46 km/h; 29 mph)
- Range: 500 nmi (580 mi; 930 km) at full speed
- Complement: 3 officer + 35 men
- Armament: 3 × 47 mm/40 guns; 3 × 450 mm (17.7 in) torpedo tubes

The Sirio class (also known as the Saffo class (Note: Chesneau and Kolesnik, Fock and the current Italian Navy refer to the class as the Sirio class, while Fraccaroli and Purnell's Illustrated Encyclopedia of Modern Weapons and Warfare refer to the Saffo class.)) was a class of six sea-going steam-powered torpedo boats of the Italian Regia Marina (Royal Navy) built by the German shipyard Schichau-Werke from 1904–1906. They served in the Italo-Turkish War and the First World War.

== Design ==
In 1904, work began at the German shipyard of Schichau-Werke, Elbing (now Elbląg, Poland) on a class of six torpedo-boats for the Italian Navy. (Note: Work also begun in at the Pattison shipyard of Naples on four torpedo boats of similar size to a design by the British torpedo-craft specialist Thornycroft, the initial members of the Pegaso-class torpedo boat.) They were 50.00 metres (164 ft 1 in) long between perpendiculars and 51.07 metres (167 ft 7 in) overall, with a beam of 6.00 metres (19 ft 8 in) and a draught of 1.60 metres (5 ft 3 in). Two Coal-fired Schultz-Thornycroft boilers fed Vertical triple-expansion steam engines rated at 3,000–3,100 indicated horsepower (2,200–2,300 kW), giving a rated speed of 25 knots (46 km/h; 29 mph), which corresponded to an in-service sea speed of about 21 knots (39 km/h; 24 mph). (Note: Speeds of up to 25.7 knots (47.6 km/h; 29.6 mph) were reached during sea trials.) Sufficient coal was carried to give a range of 598 nmi (688 mi; 1,107 km) at 23 kn (26 mph; 43 km/h) or 1,920 nmi (2,210 mi; 3,560 km) at 8 kn (9.2 mph; 15 km/h). Displacement was 210 tonnes (207 long tons).

Three 450 mm (17.7 in) torpedo tubes were fitted, with a gun armament of three 47 mm guns. The ships had a crew of 38 officers and men.

== Service ==
On delivery, the ships of the class equipped the 1st Squadron of High Seas Torpedo Boats, based first at La Spezia and then at Messina. The ships of the class were active during the Italo-Turkish War of 1911–1912, with Spica leading four Pegaso-class torpedo boats on a reconnaissance of the Dardanelles on the night of 18/19 July 1912, penetrating under fire about 18 kilometres (11 mi) before being stopped by a boom across the straits, and then escaping with little damage and no casualties. Two ships, Scorpione and Serpente, were lost following collisions during the First World War, with the remaining ships being rearmed, with two 76 mm anti-aircraft guns replacing the 47 mm guns. A third ship, Saffo was lost after running aground off Turkey on 2 April 1920. The surviving ships were disposed of in 1923.

== Ships ==
Ship	Laid down	Launched	Completed	Operational History
Sirio	27 December 1904	13 May 1905	29 September 1905	Discarded 4 March 1923
Sagittario	20 December 1904	31 May 1905	3 November 1905	Discarded 4 January 1923
Spica	14 January 1905	15 July 1905	22 November 1905	Discarded 4 March 1923
Scorpione	17 January 1905	14 September 1905	13 December 1905	Sank following collision with French gunboat Surveillente 15 May 1917 (Note: Fraccaroli swaps the dates and circumstances of the loss of Scorpione and Serpente.)
Serpente	1905	30 October 1905	12 February 1906	Sank after collision with Italian merchant ship Citta di Bari 28 June 1916
Saffo	1905	30 November 1905	1 March 1906	Lost after running aground Scalanova Bay, Turkey, 2 April 1920
