= Cannon 76/40 Model 1916 =

Italian navy anti-aircraft gun

Cannone da 76/40 Modello 1916
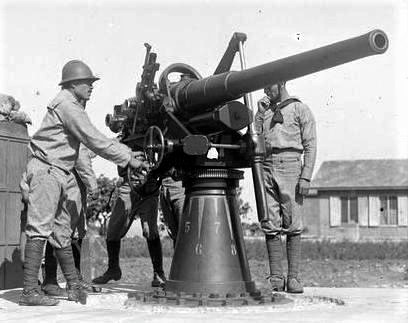
- An Italian gun crew in Albania
- Type: Naval gun; Anti-aircraft gun; Railway gun; Coastal artillery
- Place of origin: United Kingdom/Italy

Service history
- In service: 1894–1950
- Used by: See § Users
- Wars: World War I World War II

Production history
- Designer: Elswick; Armstrong
- Designed: 1893
- Manufacturer: Elswick; Ansaldo (license)
- Produced: 1916
- Variants: See § Mounts

Specifications
- Mass: 510 kg (1,120 lb)
- Length: 3.13 m (10 ft 3 in)
- Barrel length: 3 m (9 ft 10 in) L/40
- Crew: 7
- Shell: Fixed QF 76.2×440mmR
- Shell weight: 5.6–6.5 kg (12–14 lb)
- Caliber: 76.2 mm (3.00 in)
- Carriage: Pedestal mount
- Elevation: See § Mounts
- Traverse: 360°
- Rate of fire: 12-15 rounds/min
- Muzzle velocity: 680 m/s (2,230 ft/s)
- Maximum firing range: 10.7 km (35,100 ft) at +40°; 5.8 km (19,000 ft) at +70°; 4.8 km (15,700 ft) AA ceiling

The Cannone da 76/40 Modello 1916 (Cannon 76/40 Model 1916) was a widely used naval gun on ships of the Royal Italian Navy during World War I and World War II. A very versatile weapon, it was used as primary, secondary and tertiary armament on a number of ship classes, while other ship classes had a shortened version of it, the Cannone da 76/30 Modello 1915. After being replaced aboard ships of the Royal Italian Navy it saw widespread use on land in a number of different roles such as coastal artillery, anti-aircraft gun and railroad gun during World War II.

== History ==
The 76/40 Model 1916's origins lay in the British QF 12-pounder 12 cwt naval gun designed 1893 and first produced in 1897. The QF 12-pounder 12 cwt gun was designed and produced by the Elswick Ordnance Company for the British Royal Navy and also for export customers. Italy and Japan were two early export customers that later purchased production licenses for the gun. The majority of the Italian guns were produced by the Ansaldo Company from a design provided during World War I by the Armstrong Company, the parent company of EOC.

== Construction ==
The 76/40 Model 1916 was a fairly complicated design with an A tube, a shrunk-on jacket that extended to the breech, and a B tube which extended to the muzzle. Over the jacket and B tube a C hoop was shrunk on, which screwed onto the jacket and secured the B tube. There was a shortened version of the gun called the 76/30 Model 1915, which was used on a few classes of destroyers, submarines, tugs and minesweepers. The 76/30 Model 1915 were also used as truck mounted artillery during both world wars. The mounts for the Italian guns differed from their British counterparts and there were five different varieties. The quick-fire breech was identical to that of the Royal Navy gun, except for the cartridge extractor and the firing mechanism. Traverse and elevation were manual, and a crew of seven were needed to man the gun. The guns fired fixed quick-fire ammunition and a crew could sustain a rate of fire of 12 to 15 rounds per minute.

== Mounts ==
- Model 1915 - pedestal mount:

-10° to +42° elevation, which weighed 1,790 kg (3,950 lb) complete.

- Regia Marina Model 1916 - pedestal mount:

-10° to +65° elevation, which weighed 1,790 kg (3,950 lb) complete.

- Ansaldo Model 1917 - pedestal mount:

-10° to +75° elevation, which weighed 2,676 kg (5,900 lb) complete.

- Cannone da 76/40 C.A. - pedestal mount:

-5° to +75° elevation, which weighed 2,676 kg (5,900 lb) complete.

- Cannone da 76/40 modificata 35 - pedestal mount:

-6° to +81° elevation, which weighed 5,243 kg (11,559 lb) complete.

== Naval use ==
The 76/40 Model 1916 was widely used on a number of different types and classes of ships. It was often mounted in single casemates, turrets or on unprotected pivot mounts. It was used aboard pre-dreadnought battleships, dreadnought battleships, protected cruisers, armored cruisers, light cruisers, destroyers, torpedo boats, minesweepers, submarines, gunboats, lighters and armored trains of the Royal Italian Navy.

Ship classes that carried the 76/40 include:

- Andrea Doria-class battleships
- Ardito-class destroyers
- Audace-class destroyers
- Conte di Cavour-class battleships
- Curtatone-class destroyers
- Generali-class destroyers
- La Masa-class destroyers
- Libia
- Marasti-class destroyers
- Palestro-class destroyers
- Pegaso-class torpedo boats
- Pisa-class cruisers
- Re Umberto-class ironclads
- San Giorgio
- Sirio-class torpedo boats
- NMS Constanța-class

== Anti-aircraft use ==
In 1933 the navy began replacing the 76/40. Salvaged guns were mounted on a high angle pedestal mount and given the designation Cannone da 76/40 C.A. and assigned to anti-aircraft and coastal artillery units of the Royal Italian Army. In 1935 some guns were given new recuperators and higher angle mounts and redesignated as the Cannone da 76/40 modificata 35. Slow traverse, slow elevation, low muzzle velocity, lack of automated fire direction and lack of automatic fuse setting hindered its use as an anti-aircraft gun. However it was estimated that Italy had 730 Cannone da 76/40 C.A. and Cannone da 76/40 modificata 35 guns in use during World War II. These remained in use together with 66/47, 76/45 Model 1911, 100/47, 102/35 and 102/45 due to insufficient numbers of the newer Cannone da 75/46 and Cannone da 90/53. Unmodified guns taken over by Germany after the Italian defeat were given the designation 7.62 cm Flak 266/1 (i) and modified guns were given the designation 7.62 cm Flak 266/2 (i).

== Autocannoni (Self-propelled AA gun) use ==
During World War I the Royal Italian Navy created two batteries, four guns each of truck-mounted anti-aircraft guns. These were referred to as "autocannoni". The guns were Model 1915 76/30's mounted on Fiat 18 B.L.R. trucks. These batteries were used to defend Italian naval bases, although one battery was attached to the Royal Italian Army late in the war. During the inter-war period a third battery equipped with six truck-mounted 76/30 guns was created and the earlier guns were mounted on new Lancia Ro truck chassis. In 1942 some of the guns were again mounted on newer Fiat 634N truck chassis. These guns mainly used as anti-aircraft guns with secondary anti-tank and field artillery roles. The three batteries equipped with 76/30 guns were the 13th and 14th Batteries with five guns each, and the 16th Battery with four guns. The 14th was assigned to the 60th Infantry Division "Sabratha", while the 16th was assigned to the 16th Motorized Division "Pistoia". The last seven surviving guns were part of the 131st Armored Division "Centauro" when it surrendered in Tunisia in May 1943.

== Users ==
- Finland
- Germany
- Italy
- Romania — Used on the NMS Constanța.
- Spain

== Photo gallery ==
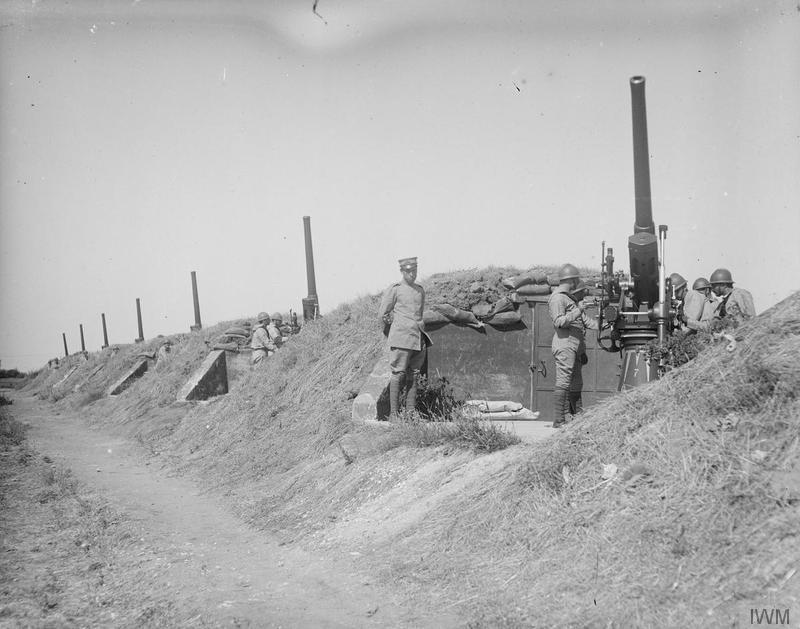
An Italian anti-aircraft battery in Albania.

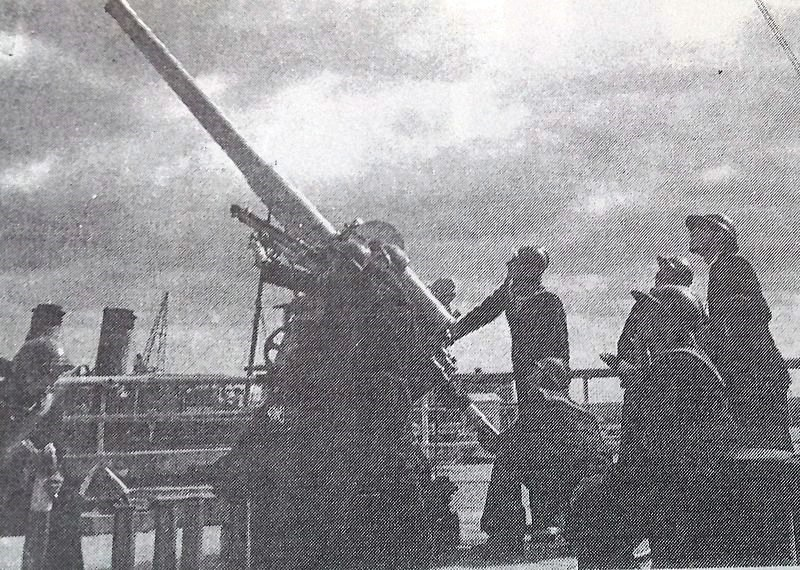
76/40 Model 1916 gun aboard the Romanian submarine tender Constanța

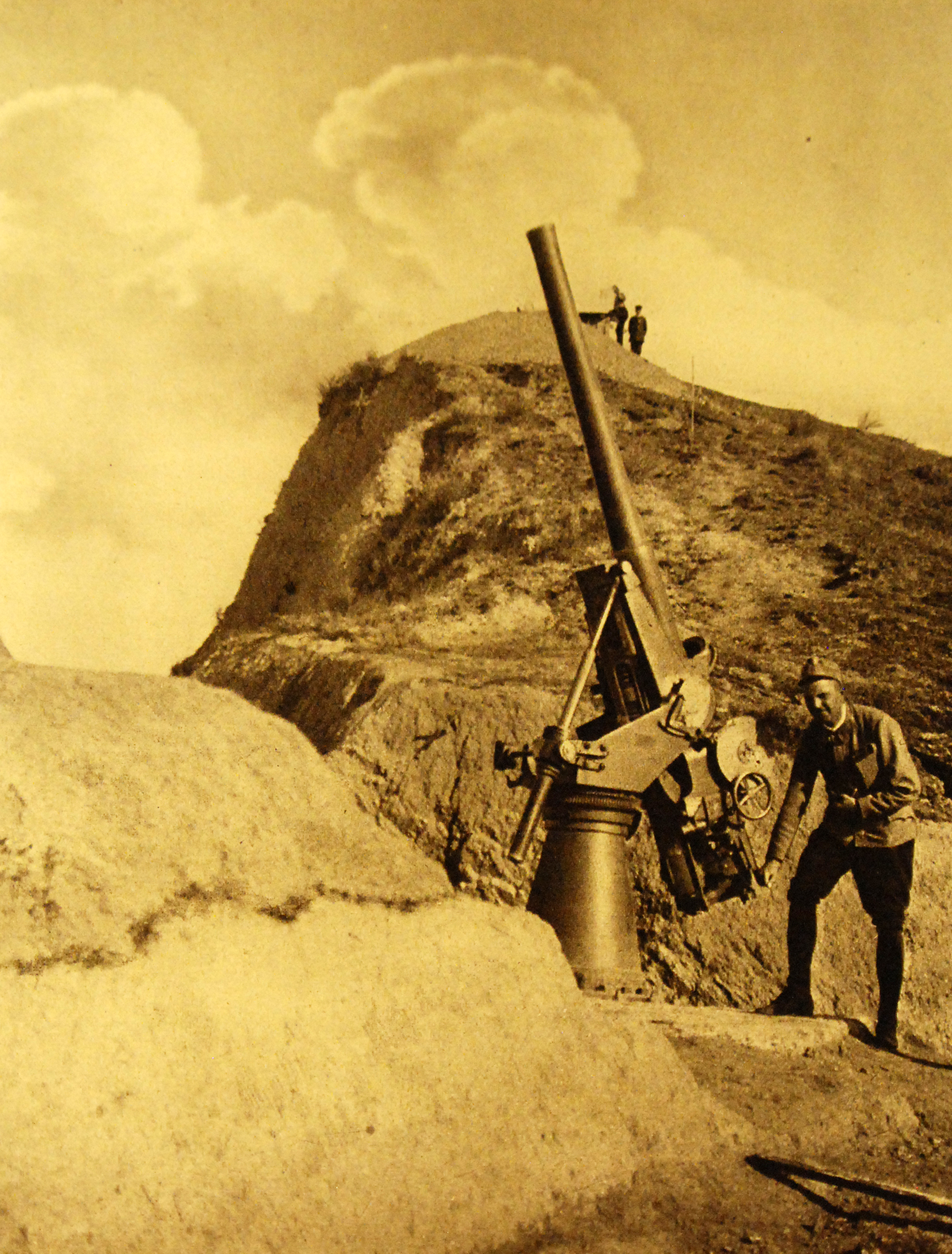
A 76/40 captured by the Austro-Hungarians.

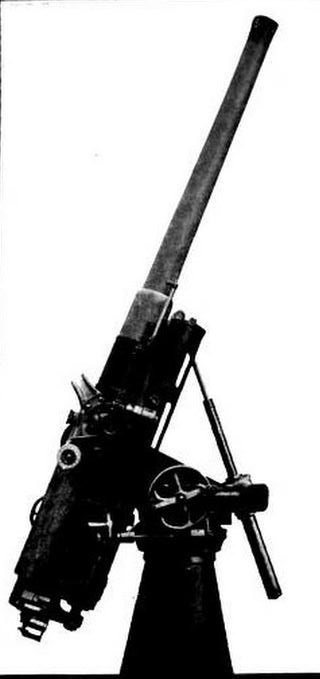
