= Pegaso-class torpedo boat =

Class overview
- Builders: Pattison, Naples, Odero, Sestri Ponente
- Operators: Regia Marina
- Preceded by: Sirio class
- Succeeded by: Orione class
- Built: 1904–1909
- In commission: 1905–1927
- Completed: 18
- Lost: 2
- Retired: 16

General characteristics
- Type: High-Seas Torpedo boat
- Displacement: 210 t (210 long tons) (Perseo series); 216.5 t (213.1 long tons) (Cigno and Alcione series)
- Length: 50.05 m (164 ft 2 in) pp; 50.35 m (165 ft 2 in) oa
- Beam: 5.3 m (17 ft 5 in)
- Draught: 1.725–1.775 m (5 ft 7.9 in – 5 ft 9.9 in)
- Propulsion: 2 × Vertical triple-expansion steam engines; Coal-fired Thornycroft boilers; 2,900 ihp (2,200 kW)
- Speed: 25 kn (46 km/h; 29 mph)
- Range: 300–350 nmi (350–400 mi; 560–650 km) at full speed
- Complement: 3 officer + 32–39 men
- Armament: 2× 57 mm/43 guns; 1× 47 mm/43 gun; 3× 450 mm (17.7 in) torpedo tubes

The Pegaso class was a class of 18 Italian sea-going steam-powered torpedo boats built between 1904 and 1909. They served in the Italo-Turkish War and the First World War, when one was sunk, and continued in use until the 1920s.

== Design ==
In 1904, four High-Seas Torpedo Boats were laid down at the Pattison shipyard of Naples, to a design licensed from the British shipbuilder Thornycroft. They were powered by two triple expansion steam engines fed by two Thornycroft coal-fired water-tube boilers which gave 2,900–3,279 ihp (2,163–2,445 kW) driving two shafts and allowing the contract speed of 25 knots (46 km/h; 29 mph) to be reached. Two funnels were fitted. Torpedo armament consisted of three 450 mm (17.7 in) torpedo tubes, with a gun armament of two 57 mm/43 guns and one 47 mm/43 gun. (Note: An additional six High Seas Torpedo Boats were ordered from the German shipyard Schichau-Werke in 1904. These ships, which were of similar size and capabilities to the Pegaso class, became the Sirio class.)

While these four ships (known as the Perseo series) were built, launching and completing in 1905–06, work began on two further batches, with eight more being ordered from Pattison (the Cigno series) and six from Odero, Sestri (the Alcione series). These ships were built with thicker plating than those of the Perseo series, and so were slightly heavier (displacing 216.5 t (213.1 long tons) compared with 210 t (210 long tons) for the earlier ships). Two of the Cignos, Calipso and Climene were fitted with oil fired boilers during construction, while six more ships (Pallade, Pegaso, Procione, Airone, Alcione and Ardea) were converted to oil fuel between 1908 and 1913.

The ships were re-armed during the First World War, with the Perseo and Cigno series replacing their armament with two 76 mm (3 in)/40 guns, one 13.2 mm machine gun and two 450 mm torpedo tubes. The Alcione series' new armament differed in that one of the 76 mm guns was an anti-aircraft gun.

== Service ==
In September 1911, the Italo-Turkish War broke out. The Italian Navy, including its torpedo boats, was highly active during the war. Actions involving the Pegaso class included Cigno carrying out shore bombardment along with larger units of the fleet in support of Italian land forces near Tripoli in November 1911, and a reconnaissance of the Dardanelles by five torpedo boats (the Sirio-class ship Spica and four Pegaso-class ships, Perseo, Astore, Climene and Centauro).

Several of the Pegaso class were used as high-speed minesweepers during the First World War. Perseo collided with sister ship Astore on 6 February 1917, and sunk when one of its torpedoes exploded. Arpia struck the wreck of the Neapolitan frigate Torquato Tasso (which had sunk off Porto d'Ascoli in 1861) on 17 January 1918. It sustained major damage and sank in shallow water, but was raised and repaired, re-entering service in July 1918.

The surviving vessels were discarded from 1923 to 1927.

== Ships ==
=== Perseo series ===
Construction data (Perseo series)
Ship	Builder	Laid down	Launched	Completed	Operational history
Perseo	Pattison, Naples	10 August 1904	5 December 1905	26 August 1906	Sank 6 February 1917 following collision with torpedo boat Astore off Stromboli
Pegaso	Pattison, Naples	13 August 1904	12 August 1905	23 September 1906	Discarded 4 March 1923
Procione	Pattison, Naples	23 August 1904	16 December 1905	26 September 1906	Converted to minesweeper 1917; Discarded 17 April 1923
Pallade	Pattison, Naples	25 August 1904	1 June 1906	26 September 1906	Discarded 4 March 1923

=== Cigno series ===
Construction data (Cigno series)
Ship	Builder	Laid down	Launched	Completed	Operational history
Cigno	Pattison, Naples	17 April 1905	9 May 1906	26 September 1906	Discarded 4 March 1923
Cassiopea	Pattison, Naples	28 April 1905	7 July 1906	26 September 1906	Minesweeper 1917–18; Discarded 27 November 1927
Centauro	Pattison, Naples	21 June 1905	20 December 1906	26 May 1907	Ran aground off Antalya, Turkey 5 November 1921 and sank
Clio	Pattison, Naples	27 July 1905	20 October 1906	17 April 1907	Discarded 4 March 1923
Canopo	Pattison, Naples	22 August 1905	28 February 1907	22 June 1907	Discarded 4 March 1923
Calliope	Pattison, Naples	28 September 1905	7 August 1906	22 December 1906	Discarded 13 November 1924
Calipso	Pattison, Naples	January 1908	26 April 1909	16 July 1909	Discarded 1 September 1927
Climene	Pattison, Naples	January 1908	15 May 1909	16 August 1909	Discarded 25 July 1927

=== Alcione series ===
Construction data (Alcione series)
Ship	Builder	Laid down	Launched	Completed	Operational history
Alcione	Odero, Sestri	18 August 1905	13 September 1906	1 August 1907	Minesweeper 1917; Discarded 4 March 1923
Ardea	Odero, Sestri	18 August 1905	10 January 1907	23 May 1907	Discarded 4 March 1923
Albatros	Odero, Sestri	18 August 1905	22 January 1907	14 August 1907	Discarded 4 March 1923
Airone	Odero, Sestri	19 April 1906	13 May 1907	28 November 1907	Minesweeper 1918; Sank Austro-Hungarian submarine U-23 in Strait of Otranto using explosive paravane, 21 February 1918; Discarded 25 September 1923
Astore	Odero, Sestri	19 April 1906	22 June 1907	27 January 1908	Discarded 14 June 1923
Arpia	Odero, Sestri	8 June 1906	22 August 1907	25 April 1908	Struck wreckage off Porto d'Ascoli and sunk 17 January 1918; Salvaged and repaired, recommissioned 25 July 1918; Discarded 15 March 1923
