= Reginald Bacon =

Royal Navy Admiral (1863–1947)

Admiral Sir Reginald Bacon KCB KCVO DSO
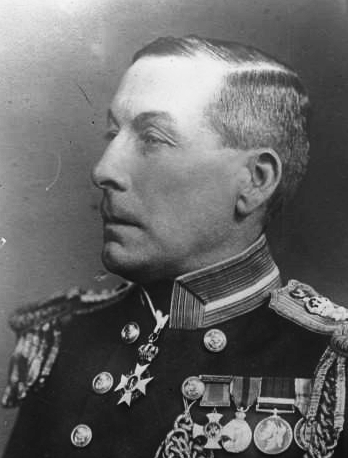
- Reginald Bacon in 1915
- Born: 6 September 1863; Wiggonholt, West Sussex
- Died: 9 June 1947 (aged 83)
- Military career
- Allegiance: United Kingdom
- Branch: Royal Navy
- Service years: 1877–1909; 1914–1919
- Rank: Admiral
- Commands: HM TB.33; HM TB.52; HMS Vesuvius; HM TB.81; HM TB.95; HMS Hazard; Inspecting Captain of Submarines; HMS Irresistible; HMS Dreadnought; Director of Naval Ordnance and Torpedoes; Dover Patrol
- Conflicts: Benin Expedition of 1897; First World War
- Awards: Knight Commander of the Order of the Bath; Knight Commander of the Royal Victorian Order; Distinguished Service Order

Admiral Sir Reginald Hugh Spencer Bacon, KCB, KCVO, DSO (6 September 1863 – 9 June 1947) was an officer in the Royal Navy noted for his technical abilities. According to Admiral of the Fleet Lord Fisher, twice First Sea Lord, he was at one time "acknowledged as the cleverest officer in the Navy".

== Family ==
Reginald was born at Wiggonholt in West Sussex, the son of the parish rector, Thomas Bacon, and his wife, Lavinia Emma, the daughter of George Shaw of Teignmouth in Devon. His father was the nephew of the industrialist, Anthony Bushby Bacon of Elcot Park in Berkshire and the great-uncle of the historian, Emma Elizabeth Thoyts, of Sulhamstead House, also in Berkshire.

== Early career ==
Reginald entered the Navy in 1877, qualified as a torpedo lieutenant, and first came to wider notice as commander of a flotilla of torpedo boats in the British naval manoeuvres of 1896. In 1897 he served as a member of the British punitive expedition to Benin, and on his return from active service wrote the book Benin, the City of Blood (1897), describing the campaign.

Promoted to captain in 1900, he left the Mediterranean Station and was appointed to the new position of Inspecting Captain of Submarines with the task of leading development of the Royal Navy's earliest submarine boats. In August 1901 came the accompanying appointment as captain of HMS Hazard, which had recently been converted into the world's first submarine depot ship. He was recognized for his fine technical mind. Fisher's enthusiasm for Bacon's intelligence helped his career. The Admiralty appointed Bacon while a relatively junior captain to a comparatively senior position, and attached laudatory minutes to Bacon's official reports.

In early 1901 he was appointed by King Edward to take part in a special diplomatic mission to announce the King's accession to the governments of Austria-Hungary, Romania, Serbia, and Turkey.

== Technical ability and character ==
Bacon was well-qualified for his new work with submarines, having served in the torpedo branch of the navy throughout the 1890s. He had spent several years on the staff of HMS Vernon, Britain's main torpedo school, and his character was dominated by a pronounced flair for things mechanical. Later in his career Bacon made a significant contribution to the design of the revolutionary all-big-gun battleship Dreadnought, developed siege guns for the British Expeditionary Force in 1914 and mastered the technical complexities required to implement his proposal for a North Sea Mine Barrage. After his retirement, he settled down to write books with titles such as A Simple Guide to Wireless for All Whose Knowledge of Electricity is Childlike.

Historian Mike Dash observes that while "there is no doubt that [his] mastery of the technology with which he dealt reinforced the independence of the submarine branch, he was a remote and stubborn centraliser who rarely admitted he needed help from anybody".

Another trait which became increasingly significant in Bacon's naval career was what Dash referred to as "the unfortunate knack which [he] developed of polarising the opinions others held of him." To Maurice Hankey, during the war, Bacon was "the one officer with offensive spirit"; to the notoriously offensive-minded Reginald Tyrwhitt, commander of the Harwich Force, he was a worse enemy than the Germans, unwilling to take risks and "our bugbear... the Streaky One has obsessed everyone at the Admiralty and does exactly what he pleases with them... You will understand me when I say he is not a white man."

== Inspecting Captain of Submarines ==
According to biographer Michael Dash, "None of these controversies... should be allowed to obscure Bacon's early achievements as ICS, which were very considerable. To Bacon goes the credit of developing the semi-autonomous submarine branch that consistently performed well in peace and war. Equally important, his determined caution ensured that the branch was developed along sensible lines". Bacon was acutely aware of the early shortcomings of underwater craft and "particularly emphasised" that he did not "commend rashness, in fact my life is spent in preaching caution... The only fear regarding the safety of the Boats is that familiarity may breed over-confidence". His philosophy was that "success belongs to the man who pays attention to infinite details".

Bacon's chief contribution to the early development of the submarine was the design for HMS A1, the first British-designed boat and a significant advance over the earlier Holland Class boats. A1, developed by Bacon in conjunction with the naval architects of Messrs Vickers, Sons & Maxim, added a conning tower and a periscope to the pioneering design of the Irish-born American inventor John P. Holland, making her significantly more seaworthy and a more potent attacking threat. "While RN submarines retained Holland's ideas in outline... the specifics of the design from the A class onwards were essentially British", Dash writes. Bacon also played an important role in the design of the remainder of Britain's A-class submarines and worked out the first tactics for British boats.

== First Captain of HMS Dreadnought ==
Bacon was the first captain of the battleship HMS Dreadnought. In June 1906 he commissioned her for her trials and took her on a special cruise to the West Indies. In August 1907 he was appointed to the position of Director of Naval Ordnance succeeding Jellicoe.

== Coventry Ordnance Works ==
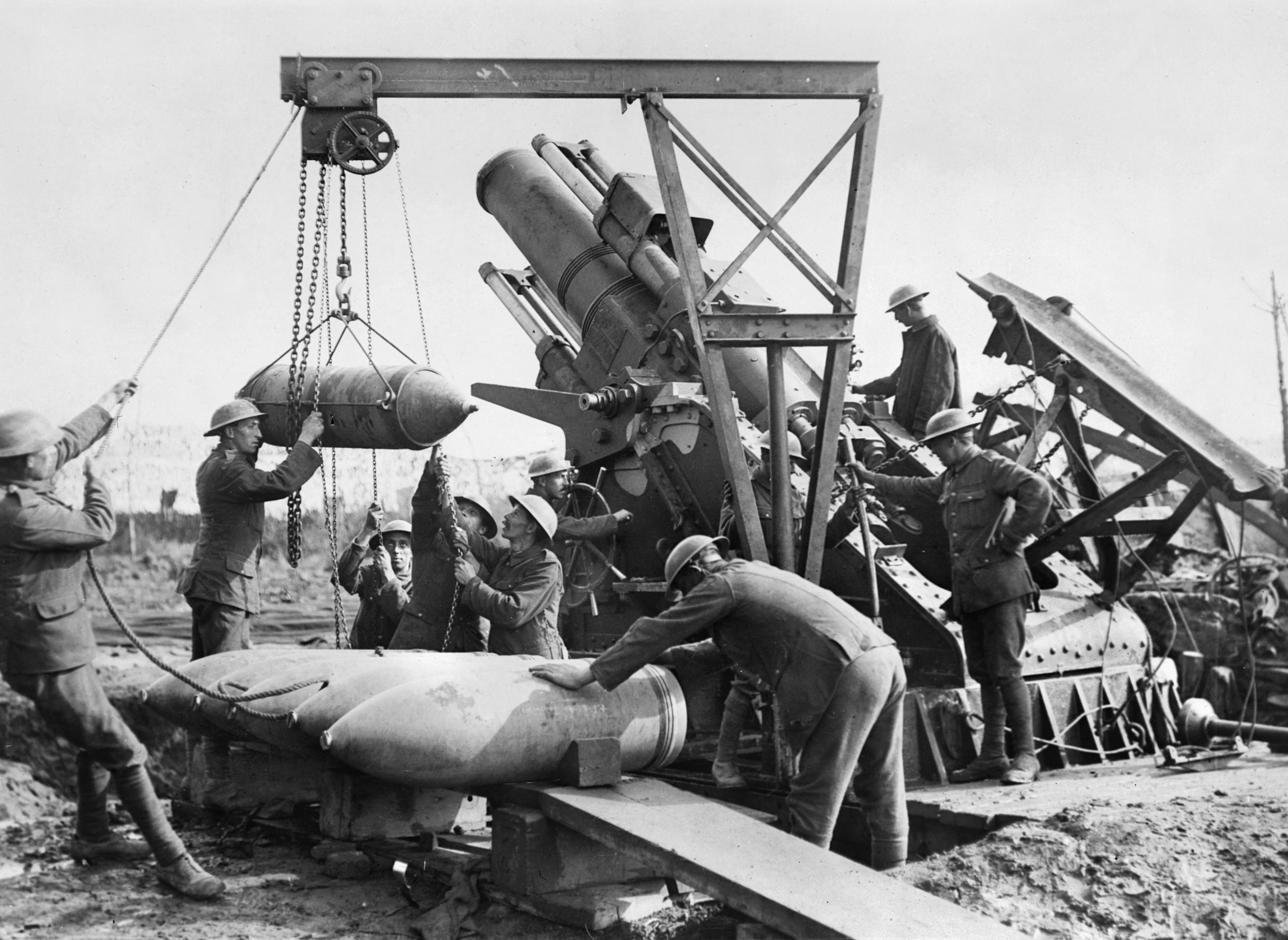
A 15-inch howitzer on the Menin Road, 1917

In July 1909 he was promoted Rear-Admiral. In November 1909 he retired from the Active List as Director of Naval Ordnance. He had been offered the appointment of managing director of the Coventry Ordnance Works (COW).

During his time there, the Coventry works manufactured the QF 4.5-inch howitzer, the BL 5.5-inch Mark I naval gun and the Army's biggest gun to date, the BL 9.2-inch howitzer. On the outbreak of war, prompted by the German army's bombardment of the Liège forts, the Coventry factory privately designed the BL 15-inch howitzer, designed to be road transportable by three 105 hp Daimler-Foster Artillery tractors. (Note: Bacon made a 1:12 scale model of a 15-inch gun in 1922 and presented it to the Society of Model and Experimental Engineers, of which he was President.) The Army was unimpressed by its lack of range and didn't adopt the weapon, but Winston Churchill, as First Lord of the Admiralty, formed the Howitzer Brigade of the Royal Marine Artillery with the twelve guns. The first howitzer was shipped to France in February 1915 and Bacon was given a temporary commission in the Royal Marine Artillery as an extra Colonel 2nd Commandant. In April 1915 he was called to the Admiralty, where Churchill and Jackie Fisher were keen to send a single 15-inch howitzer to Gallipoli. He arranged for the howitzer (no. 3) to be transported, and a few days later was in Paris ready to start for the Dardanelles, when he was recalled to London by Churchill and made Commander-in-Chief, Dover, replacing Rear-Admiral Horace Hood.

== Commander of the Dover Patrol ==
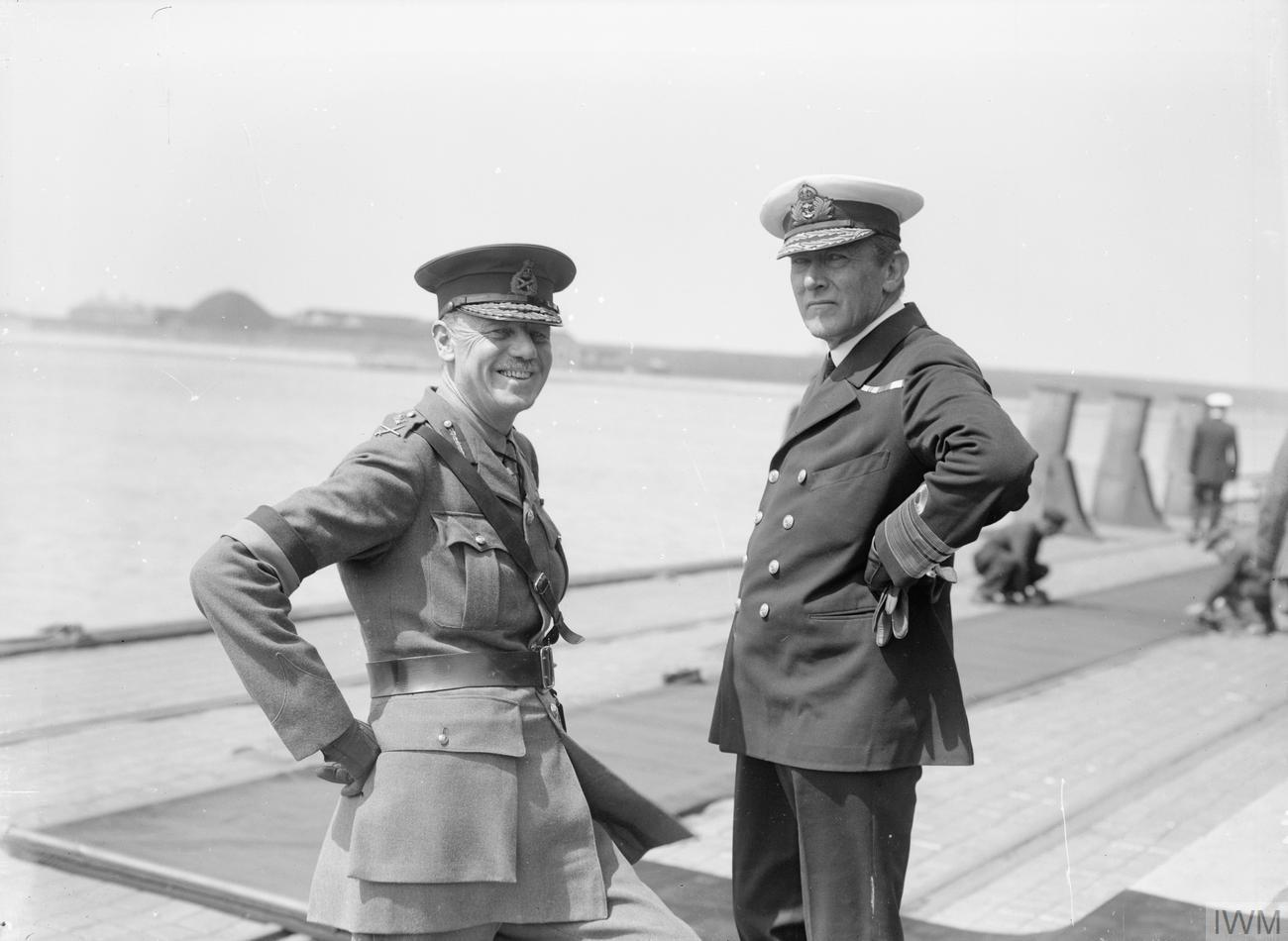
Major-General Sir William Peyton and Vice-Admiral Sir Reginald Bacon waiting on the quayside at Calais for the arrival of King George V and Queen Mary, June 1917.

Bacon became commander of the Dover Patrol in April 1915. He was promoted vice-admiral late in 1916. Seeking to recapture the German occupied ports of Ostend and Zeebrugge, Bacon assisted in the planning of naval landings on the Belgian coastline. Bacon's plan for an amphibious assault eventually came to form the third phase of Field Marshal Douglas Haig's 1917 Flanders Offensive. The plan was for the British 1st Division to land just behind the German lines at Middelkerke while the XV Corps under Henry Rawlinson assaulted from Allied lines at Nieuport. Although specialized landing craft and amphibious tanks were constructed, the failure of Haig's offensive to break out of the Ypres Salient led to the postponement and eventual cancellation of the landing. For further information, see Operation Hush.

Bacon was later involved in the development of the North Sea Mine Barrage. Bacon spent some time considering and planning the Zeebrugge and Ostend raids, but he felt that crucial details of his plan were altered or omitted due to inexperience.

In his book Room 40: British Naval Intelligence, 1914–1918, Patrick Beesly was not complimentary of Bacon suggesting that his brilliance may have been marred by his fixation on a correct way of doing things, and of "being convinced that he was the only man in the regiment who was marching in step". Bacon insisted that the Dover Barrage was an effective block to German U-boats breaking out into the Atlantic despite reports from Naval Intelligence that U-boats were regularly passing through it under cover of darkness. After repeated refusals to illuminate the barrage at night, Bacon was instructed to do so by Rosslyn Wemyss following his replacement of Sir John Jellicoe as First Sea Lord. The discovery and destruction of a U-boat transiting the barrage took place the next night, and Bacon was sacked by Eric Campbell Geddes from command of the Dover Patrol, replaced by Roger Keyes, shortly thereafter.

== Family and retirement ==
After leaving the Dover Patrol, he was promoted to admiral in September 1918 and he retired on 31 March 1919. He wrote numerous books, including biographies of John Jellicoe, 1st Earl Jellicoe and his old mentor Admiral of the Fleet Lord Fisher.

He married Cicely Surtees of Darlington, County Durham in 1897. They had a daughter and two sons, both of whom died young, one as a soldier during the First World War and the other from pneumonia as a naval cadet in 1919. Bacon died on 9 June 1947 at home in Romsey, Hampshire.

== Published works ==
- Bacon, R. H. S. Benin: City of Blood. London: Edward Arnold, 1897. OCLC 4454844
- Bacon, R. H. S. The Dover Patrol. London, 2 volumes: Hutchinson, 1919. OCLC 1136826
- Bacon, R. H. S. The Jutland Scandal. London: Hutchinson & Co., 1925. 2nd ed. OCLC 1900062
- Bacon, R. H. S. A Naval Scrap-Book. First part, 1877–1900. London: Hutchinson, 1925. OCLC 6080198
- Bacon, R. H. S. The Stolen Submarine: a Story of Woman's Pluck. London: E. Nash & Greyson, 1926. OCLC 316187982
- Bacon, R. H. S. A Social Sinner. London: E. Nash & Greyson, 1926. OCLC 316187977
- Bacon, R. H. S. The Motor-Car And How It Works. London: Mills & Boon, 1927. OCLC 843000176
- Bacon, R. H. S. A Simple Guide To Wireless, For All Whose Knowledge of Electricity is Childlike. London: Mills & Boon, 1930. OCLC 220643179
- Bacon, R. H. S. The Concise Story of the Dover Patrol. London: Hutchinson, 1932. OCLC 1899634
- Bacon, R. H. S. The Life of John Rusworth, Lord Jellicoe. London: Cassell & Co., 1936.
- Bacon, R. H. S. From 1900 Onward. London: Hutchinson, 1940. OCLC 8104542
- Bacon, R. H. S. Modern Naval Strategy. London: Frederick Muller, 1941. OCLC 17241075
- Bacon, R. H. S. Britain's Glorious Navy. London: Odhams, 1942. OCLC 3139787
- Bacon, R. H. S. with J. F. C. Fuller and Patrick Playfair. Warfare Today. How Modern Battles are Planned and Fought on Land, at Sea, and in the Air. London: Odhams Press, 1944.
- Bacon, R. H. The Life of Lord Fisher of Kilverstone VOL 1 New York (1929): Doubleday. Facsimile edition (2007): ISBN 1-4325-9362-5
- Bacon, R. H. The Life of Lord Fisher of Kilverstone VOL 2 New York (1929): Doubleday. Facsimile edition (2007): ISBN 1-4325-9351-X

Military offices
Preceded by Horace Hood	Vice-Admiral, Dover Patrol; 1915–1918	Succeeded by Sir Roger Keyes
