= Giovanni Barbini =

Italian naval officier (1901–1998)

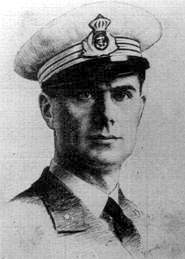
- Born: 25 June 1901; Venice, Veneto, Italy
- Died: 26 September 1998 (aged 97); Rosignano Marittimo, Tuscany, Italy
- Military career
- Allegiance: Kingdom of Italy
- Branch: Regia Marina; Italian Navy
- Service years: 1922–1956
- Commands: Angelo Bassini (torpedo boat); Nicola Fabrizi (torpedo boat)
- Conflicts: World War II; Battle of the Strait of Otranto (WIA)
- Awards: Gold Medal of Military Valor; Military Order of Savoy

Giovanni Barbini (25 June 1901 – 26 September 1998) was an Italian naval officer during World War II.

== Biography ==
Barbini was born in Venice on 25 June 1901. After graduating as a sea captain at the Nautical Institute of Venice in 1921, in 1922 he enlisted in the Italian Royal Navy to carry out his military service; in November 1922, after attending the reserve officer course, he became a midshipman. He was promoted to ensign in June 1923; having decided to pursue a naval career, he remained in the Navy beyond his compulsory service time. In the following years he served on both surface vessels and submarines, as well as in shore assignments at the Northern Adriatic Naval Command, the San Bartolomeo Specialist School in La Spezia, the San Marco Regiment and the Pula Naval Command. He was promoted to sub-lieutenant in March 1927 and to Lieutenant in November 1936. On 19 November 1939 he assumed command of the torpedo boat Angelo Bassini, which he still commanded when Italy entered World War II on 10 June 1940.

Having been given command of the torpedo boat Nicola Fabrizi, on the night of 11–12 November 1940 Barbini was escorting a convoy in the Southern Adriatic, when the latter came under attack by four light cruisers and two destroyers under Vice Admiral Henry Pridham-Wippell. In the ensuing battle, while the escort leader in the auxiliary cruiser RAMB III withdrew after firing a few shots, Barbini counterattacked twice with guns and torpedoes (that could not be fired due to the damage suffered), in an attempt to draw enemy fire on his ship and distract the British force from the merchant ships. Fabrizi was heavily damaged, and was ultimately unable to prevent the convoy's destruction; on fire and slowly sinking, the torpedo boat limped into Vlorë (Italian: Valona). Barbini had been seriously wounded at the beginning of the battle, but despite serious blood loss from a wounded leg, he refused medical aid until the fighting was over, and maintained command of his ship until it was safely moored in harbour. For his determined defense of the convoy in the face of a superior enemy, Barbini was awarded the Gold Medal of Military Valor.

After recovering from his wounds, Barbini was transferred to the Venice Naval Department; he was promoted to lieutenant commander in July 1941, and to Commander in January 1943. At the time of the Armistice of Cassibile, he was serving at the Venice Naval Command; he adhered to the Italian Social Republic, and was appointed mayor (podestà) of Venice till 1945.

In March 1947 he was transferred in auxiliary, on his request. In September 1952 he was recalled to temporary service, stationed in Sardinia, then given command of the training ship Ebe and later transferred to the Autonomous Naval Command Venice. In February 1955 he was transferred to the reserve, but he remained in active service till July 1956, when he became Director of the Cini Foundation and commander of the training ship Giorgio Cini. On 1 July 1961 he was promoted to captain in the Naval Reserve. He died in Rosignano Marittimo, Livorno province, on 26 September 1998.
