= Lord Hood =

Lord Hood may refer to:

- Viscount Hood, a title in the peerage of Great Britain
  - Samuel Hood, 1st Viscount Hood, a Royal Navy officer and politician
- Fleet Admiral Lord Terrence Hood, a fictional character in the Halo video-game franchise
