= William Sells =

British vice-admiral

Vice-Admiral William Sells CMG
- Born: 19 January 1881
- Died: 31 March 1966 (aged 85)
- Military career
- Allegiance: United Kingdom
- Branch: Royal Navy
- Rank: Vice-Admiral
- Commands: HMS Sandhurst; Devonport Gunnery School; HMS Cleopatra; HMS Emperor of India; HMS Benbow; Dungeness Station
- Conflicts: World War I World War II
- Awards: Companion of the Order of St Michael and St George

Vice-Admiral William Fortescue Sells CMG (19 January 1881 – 31 March 1966) was a Royal Navy officer who became Flag Officer, Dungeness Station.

== Naval career ==
Sells joined to Royal Navy in the late 19th century and was promoted to lieutenant on 19 January 1901. He served as naval attaché at the British Embassy in Athens during the First World War for which he was appointed a Companion of the Order of St Michael and St George. Promoted to captain on 31 December 1918, he became commanding officer of the depot ship HMS Sandhurst in March 1919, Captain of Devonport Gunnery School in May 1923 and Captain of the cruiser HMS Cleopatra in November 1925. He went on to be Captain of the battleship HMS Emperor of India in January 1928 and Captain of the battleship HMS Benbow in May 1929, before retiring in April 1930. He was recalled and served as Royal Naval Officer, Carnarvon from November 1942 and as Flag Officer at Dungeness Station from June 1944 during the Second World War.
