= Action in the Strait of Otranto =

Naval action in World War II

Action in the Strait of Otranto (1940)
- Part of The Battle of the Mediterranean of the Second World War
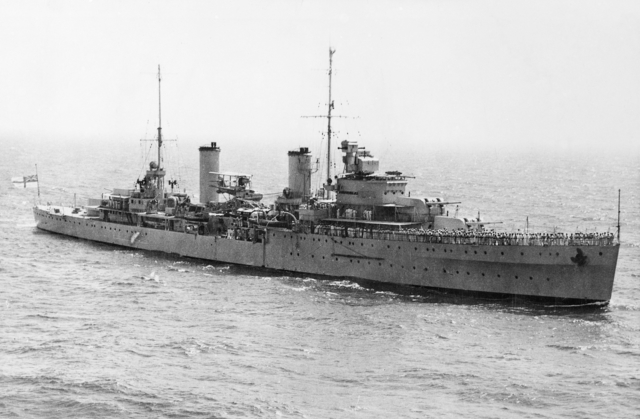
- HMAS Sydney in 1940
Date	12 November 1940
Location	Strait of Otranto, Adriatic Sea 40°48′19″N 18°41′25″E
Result	British victory

Belligerents
United Kingdom; Australia	Italy

Commanders and leaders
Henry Pridham-Wippell	Giovanni Barbini (WIA)

Strength
3 light cruisers; 2 destroyers	1 torpedo boat; 1 auxiliary cruiser; 4 merchantmen

Casualties and losses
Nil	47 killed 59 wounded 4 merchantmen sunk 1 torpedo boat damaged

The Action in the Strait of Otranto, also known as the Battle of the Strait of Otranto (1940), was the destruction of an Italian convoy on 12 November 1940 during the Battle of the Mediterranean in the Second World War. It took place in the Strait of Otranto in the Adriatic Sea, between the Royal Navy and the Italian Royal Navy (Regia Marina).

In late 1940, Italian ships had been transporting men, equipment and supplies from Brindisi to the Albanian ports of Valona and Durazzo for another offensive against Greece, during the Italo-Greek War (28 October 1940 – 23 April 1941). On 21 October 1940, Supermarina, the Italian Admiralty, established Maritrafalba to convoy ships sailing between Brindisi, Valona, and Durazzo.

The British conducted several operations by the Mediterranean Fleet from Alexandria and Force H from Gibraltar, several convoys to Greece and Malta, the return of ships from Malta, ship reinforcements to the Mediterranean Fleet by Force H, attacks by carrier aircraft on Sardinian airfields, the Battle of Taranto (11/12 November) and a raid into the southern Adriatic to attack convoys on the Brindisi–Valona route.

Force X, three British light cruisers and two destroyers from the Mediterranean Fleet, sailed north to the Strait of Otranto in the Adriatic on 11 November, catching a convoy of four merchant ships, with two Regia Marina escorts, returning from Valona that night. Force X sank the freighters and damaged an escort for no loss, then rejoined the Mediterranean Fleet.

== Background ==
=== Naval operations ===
On 4 November Convoy AN 6 sailed from Port Said to Greece and Convoy MW 3 from Alexandria for Malta, escorted by the anti-aircraft cruisers HMS Calcutta and Coventry and the destroyers HMS Dainty, Vampire, Voyager and HMAS Waterhen. After escorting Convoy AN 6 to Suda Bay in Crete the ships, less Voyager which stayed behind, were to sail westwards with Convoy MW 3. Force B, the light cruisers HMS Ajax and HMAS Sydney sailed from Alexandria on 5 November, landed supplies at Suda Bay the next day then sailed to rendezvous with the Mediterranean Fleet.

Convoy MW 3 sailed for Malta as part of Operation MB 8, supported by the Mediterranean Fleet, comprising the aircraft carrier HMS Illustrious, the battleships Warspite, Valiant, Ramillies and Malaya, the 3rd Cruiser Squadron with the heavy cruiser York, the light cruiser Gloucester and HMS Orion of the 7th Cruiser Squadron (Vice-Admiral Henry Pridham-Wippell) to be joined by Ajax and Sydney. (Note: Convoy MW 3 consisted of RFA Plumleaf, the merchant ships Volo 1,587 GRT and Empire Patrol (ex-Rodi), Devis (6,054 GRT) and the liner Weiwera (12,435 GRT).) The 13 destroyers HMS Nubian from the 14th Destroyer Flotilla, Mohawk, Jervis, Janus, Juno, Hyperion of the 2nd Destroyer Flotilla, Hasty, Hero, Hereward, Havoc, Ilex and Decoy and Defender, detached from the 2nd Destroyer Flotilla, accompanied the bigger ships.

On 7 November, Operation Coat began when Force H (Vice-Admiral James Somerville) sailed from Gibraltar with the aircraft carrier HMS Ark Royal, the light cruiser HMS Sheffield and the destroyers Faulknor of the 8th Destroyer Flotilla, HMS Duncan, Firedrake, Forester, Fortune and Fury to cover Force F, reinforcements for the Mediterranean Fleet, consisting of the battleship HMS Barham, the heavy cruiser HMS Berwick and the light cruiser Glasgow with the destroyers Encounter, Gallant, Greyhound and Griffin as far as the area south of Sardinia on 9 November. Operation Crack, subsidiary to Operation Coat, took place on 9 November when Swordfish bombers of 810 Naval Air Squadron, 818 Naval Air Squadron and 820 Naval Air Squadron from Ark Royal attacked Cagliari in Sardinia.

The Operation Coat ships were discovered by the Regia Aeronautica and attacked on 9 November but only obtained near misses on Ark Royal, Barham and Duncan. The Italian submarines Alagi, Axum, Aradam, Medusa and Diaspro took position south-west of Sardinia on 9 November but encountered no British ships. The 14th Destroyer Squadron with Vivaldi, Da Noli, Pancaldo and Malocello was sent into the Sicilian Channel but passed Force F, which had detached from Force H on the night of 9/10 November, without making contact. Force F met the Mediterranean Fleet from the east early on 10 November, south of Malta, then put in to Malta to disembark 2,150 troops and anti-aircraft guns. The Italian 1st Cruiser Division sailed to bombard Suda Bay, unknown to the British.

== Prelude ==
=== Force X ===
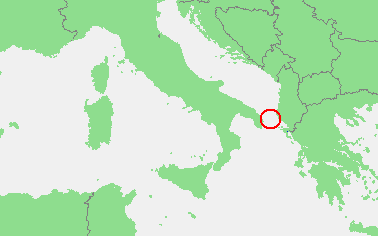
The Adriatic Sea and the Strait of Otranto circled in red

The Regia Marina sent the submarines Goffredo Mameli, Corallo, Fratelli Bandiera, Topazio, and Pier Capponi to the east of Malta but only Pier Capponi was able to get into position and fire torpedoes at Ramillies, which missed; the battleship docked at Malta with Coventry, Dainty, Vampire and Waterhen and Convoy MW 3. On 10 November Convoy ME 3 with the four unloaded ships and the escorts from Convoy MF 3, Coventry and its three destroyers, sailed eastwards and survived an attack by the submarine Topazio the next day, followed by the destroyer Vendetta and the monitor Terror which arrived in Suda Bay on 13 November. (Note: The freighters Memnon, Lanarkshire, Clan Ferguson and Clan Macaulay.)

The destroyers Faulknor, Fortune and Fury, which had acted as minesweepers for Force F, returned to Force H, south of Sardinia, for the return journey to Gibraltar. After rendezvous with the ships from the west, the Mediterranean Fleet sailed east and Italian aircraft trying to shadow the ships suffered losses to attacks by Fulmars from Illustrious. On 11 November, Illustrious with the cruisers Gloucester, Berwick, Glasgow and York, with the destroyers Hasty, Havelock. Hyperion and Ilex turned towards Taranto and Force X (Vice Admiral Henry Pridham-Wippell) the Leander-class light cruisers Orion, Sydney and Ajax, with the Tribal-class destroyers Mohawk and Nubian turned north to raid Italian convoys carrying troops and supplies to Albania across the Strait of Otranto at the entrance to the Adriatic Sea. (Note: Pridham-Wippell had taken over as Vice-Admiral, Light Forces (second in command of the Mediterranean Fleet) when Admiral John Tovey had been recalled to Britain to take command of the Home Fleet.)

=== Adriatic convoys ===
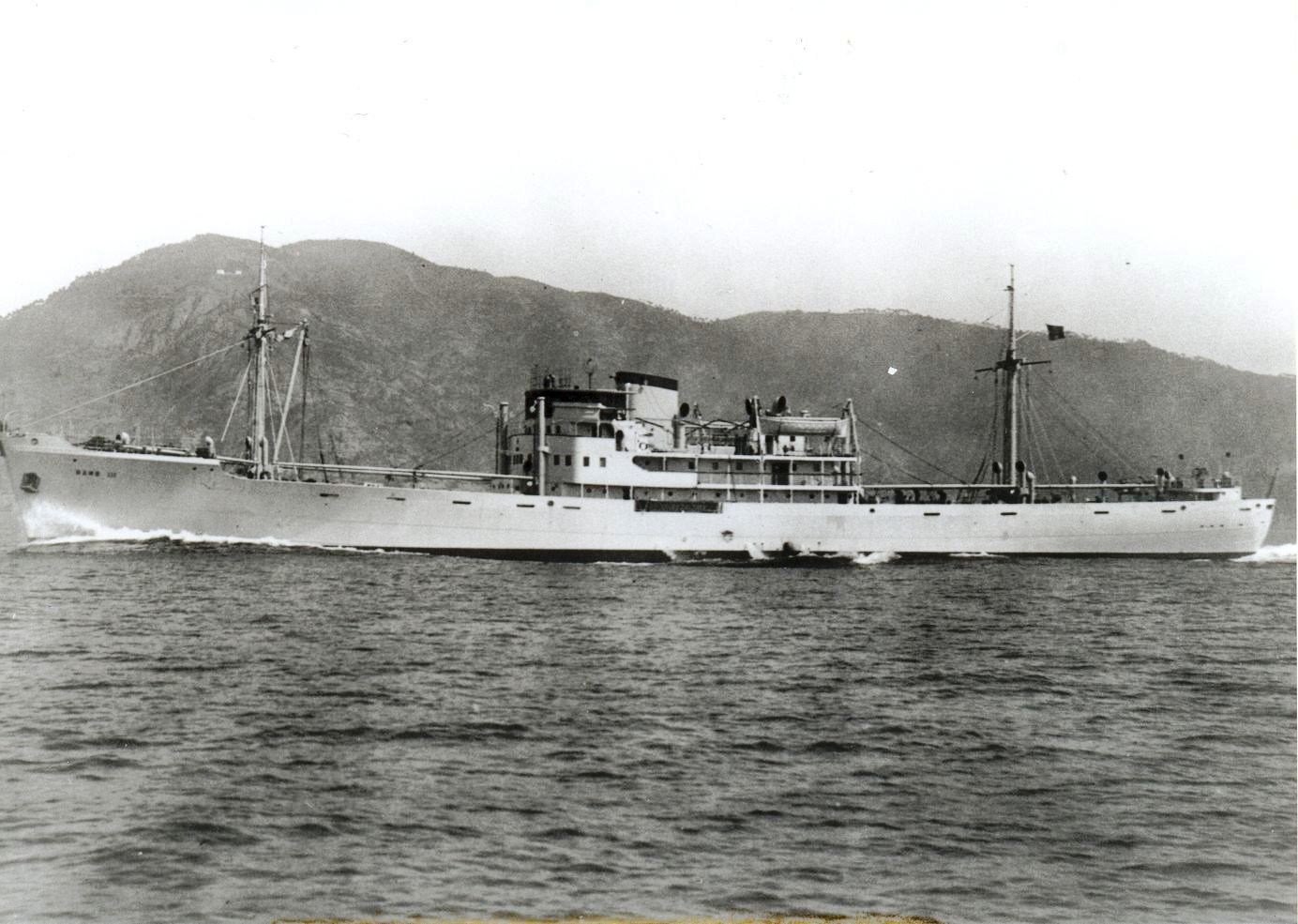
The Italian auxiliary cruiser Ramb III

In the latter part of 1940, the Italians sent 40,000 troops, 700 vehicles, and 34,000 long tons (35,000 t) of supplies from Brindisi, Italy to Valona, Albania for another offensive against Greece. On 21 October, Supermarina, the Italian Admiralty, established Comando Superiore per il Traffico con l'Albania (Maritrafalba, Capitano de Vascello Pollacchini) to convoy merchant ships sailing between Brindisi and Valona and Durazzo during the build up.

The escort force consisted of the destroyers Carlo Mirabello and Augusto Riboty, the Spica-class torpedo boat Altair, Antares, Andromeda, Aretusa, Curtatone-class destroyers Castelfidardo, Curtatone, Italian destroyer Monzambano, the Palestro-class destroyers Confienza and Solferino, the Generali-class destroyers Generale Antonio Cantore, Generale Marcello Prestinari, Nicola Fabrizi, Giacomo Medici and Francesco Stocco, patrol vessels Capit, Capitano A. Cecchi, Lago Tana, Lago Zuai, the auxiliary cruiser Ramb III, and four MAS motor torpedo boats (Motoscafo armato silurante, torpedo-armed motorboat).

== Action ==
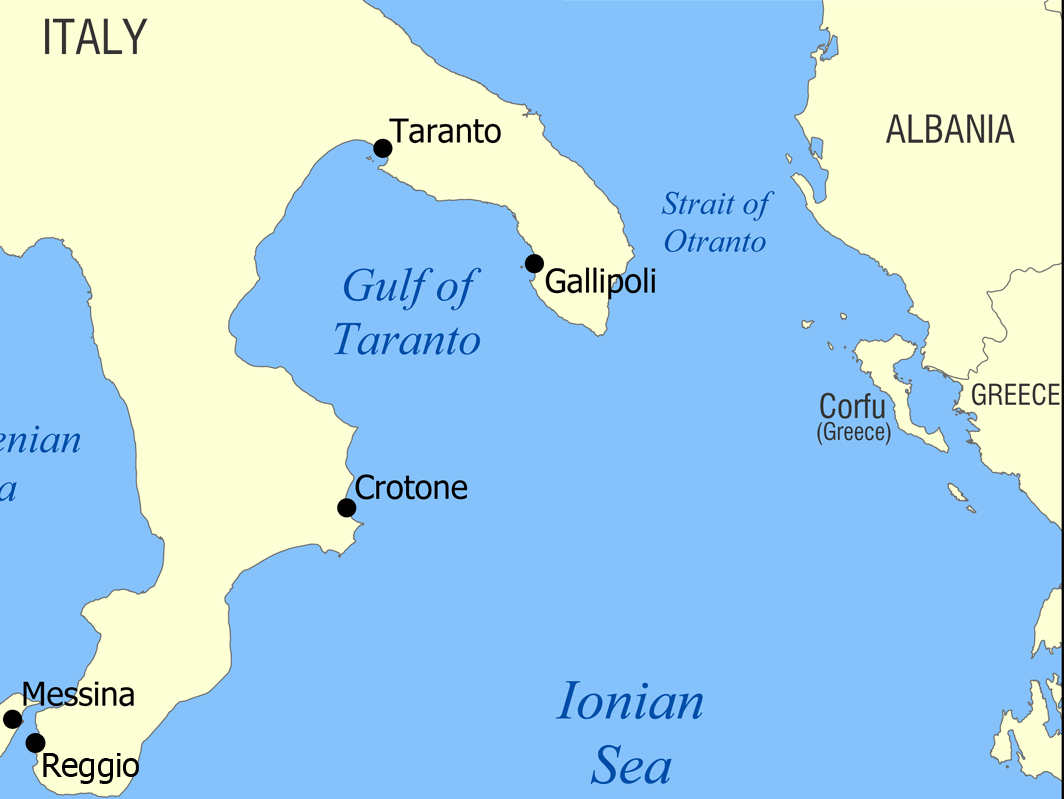
The Strait of Otranto

After diverting from the Mediterranean Fleet during the afternoon of 11 November, Force X made good speed towards the Straits of Otranto and by the early evening passed Corfu at 25 kn (29 mph; 46 km/h), slowing to 20 kn (23 mph; 37 km/h) as it closed on the Albanian coast. The sea state was calm and there was a three-quarter (near full) moon. The British ships reached the northern extent of the patrol and turned about; at 1:15 a.m. lookouts spotted four darkened ships with two escorts, Fabrizi armed with four 4-inch guns and four 17.7 in (450 mm) torpedo tubes and the auxiliary cruiser Ramb III with four 4.7-inch guns, thought by the British to be a destroyer. The escorts were on either flank of the merchant ships, which were making 8 kn (9.2 mph; 15 km/h), bearing to the north-west, Ramb III being on the side closest to the British ships.

Force X was in line astern with Orion leading and Sydney bringing up the rear, the cruisers being about 800 yd (0.39 nmi; 0.45 mi; 0.73 km) apart. Nubian was about 1.6 mi (2.5 km) off to the west of the cruisers and Mohawk a similar distance to the east. On 12 November, an Italian convoy of four empty merchant ships, Antonio Locatelli, Premuda, Capo Vado and Catalani, were on their way back from Valona, to Brindisi, escorted by the First World War-era torpedo boat Nicola Fabrizi (Tenente di vascello Giovanni Barbini) and the auxiliary cruiser Ramb III (Capitano di fregata Francesco De Angelis). The ships were travelling darkened to avoid detection. Mohawk spotted the convoy at 1:15 a.m. to the south-east at 8 nmi (9.2 mi; 15 km) distance passed the sighting to Nubian and closed on Fabrizi. The Italians saw Force X and Fabrizi sailed towards the British ships, as the freighters began to turn away. Mohawk commencing firing at 1:27 a.m., obtaining hits at the fourth salvo from 4,000 yd (2.0 nmi; 2.3 mi). (Note: O'Hara has the firing beginning at 1:25 a.m.)

Force X advanced on the western side of the convoy, firing star shell from their secondary guns and Orion engaged Fabrizi with its 4-inch armament while firing 32 salvoes, most from its forward 6-inch main armament and two torpedoes at Capo Vado, the third merchant ship in line at 6,400 yd (3.2 nmi; 3.6 mi; 5.9 km) which received a torpedo hit and began to sink. (Note: O'Hara has Orion firing 31 salvoes.) Barbini, in Fabrizi tried to launch torpedoes but hits from Orion cut the communications between the bridge and the torpedo officer. At 1:28 a.m. Fabrizi turned to starboard when 4,500 yd (2.2 nmi; 2.6 mi; 4.1 km) east-south-east of Orion opened fire and began to make smoke to cover the convoy. Orion changed targets and fired at Catalani, at the rear of the convoy, at about 5,300 yd (4,800 m), which caught fire and the crew abandoned-ship, at which Orion fired two torpedoes and sank the ship. Ajax fired on Ramb III Sydney and Ajax fired on the two merchant ships at the front, Ajax firing and missing with a torpedo.

Sydney had fired at 7,000 yd (6,400 m) as soon as Mohawk engaged and Fabrizi replied with torpedoes, one passing astern of Sydney, before being severely damaged. The freighters had turned away from Force X but the last two ships were too severely damaged to remain afloat, sinking during the night. Fabrizi made smoke and managed to escape, despite being fired on by several of the British ships and Ramb III as Sydney fired on Antonio Locatelli, which caught fire. At 1:32 a.m. Sydney shifted target and began to fire on Premuda as Ajax engaged a merchantman at the head of the convoy; a moment later, Orion fired tow torpedoes at Capo Vado and claimed one hit. Ramb III, having fired 19 salvoes turned north-east and left the scene. (Note: O'Hara has Ramb III firing 17 shells at gun flashes; Ramb III reached Bari undamaged and the captain was sacked and court-martialled for desertion.)

Fabrizi turned back between Force X and the merchant ships and at 1:35 a.m. suffered a shell hit on its man generator, followed after a minute by a shell amidships near the number 3 gun and received another hit on the bow at 1:39 a.m. the guns amidships and at the stern remained in action. The destroyers sailed in column down the port side of the convoy, firing on each ship in turn. Catalani had been hit and stopped in clouds of steam. Mohawk was about to turn at 1:50 a.m. when Pridham-Wippell ordered the ships to turn to south-south-west and steam at 28 kn (32 mph; 52 km/h) to rejoin the Mediterranean Fleet. Force X turned at 1:53 a.m., having suffered no casualties or damage but unaware that all of the merchant ships had been sunk. Force X passed the Strait at 3:30 a.m and met the fleet west of Greece near noon on 12 November.

== Aftermath ==
=== Analysis ===
In 2002, the historians Jack Greene and Alessandro Massignani wrote that the British success forced the Italians to sail convoys in daylight and to provide three torpedo-boats and an auxiliary cruiser for each four freighters; the submarines Jalea and Millelire were stationed in the strait for the next few months as a precaution, along with cruisers and destroyers based in Brindisi. Vincent O'Hara wrote in 2009 that the action was the first night attack by surface ships on an Italian convoy, which "foreshadowed how deadly British strike forces would be". It was the only successful raid on the Italian supply route to the Balkans, in which about 25 per cent of the Italian merchant fleet was engaged. Raids by the British on 19 December and by Greek destroyers eight times from 14 November and 6 January 1941 were abortive.

=== Casualties ===
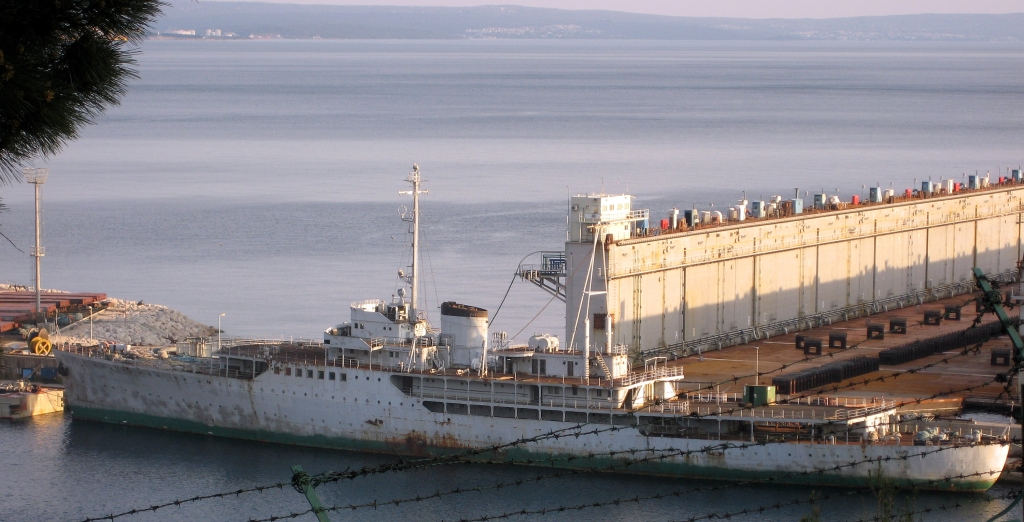
Ramb III, the only surviving participant in the battle, is on display at Rijeka as the museum ship Galeb.

The British suffered no casualties but Fabrizi lost eleven men killed and 17 wounded; survivors were rescued by the torpedo-boats Curtatone and Solferino from Valona, rescued 140 sailors; 36 men from the merchant ships were lost and the four ships sunk amounted to 16,939 GRT.

=== Subsequent operations ===
Having rejoined the Mediterranean Fleet the ships made course for Alexandria and were not found by air reconnaissance of the Regia Aeronautica until 13 November, having lost three CANT Z.501 flying boats to the fighters from Illustrious the day before. The Regia Marina sent motor torpedo boats from north of Valona, the 7th Cruiser Division, consisting of the light cruisers Muzio Attendolo, Eugenio di Savoia and Emanuele Filiberto Duca d'Aosta.

== Orders of battle ==
=== Regia Marina ===
Regia Marina
Ship	Flag	Class	Notes
Ramb III	Kingdom of Italy	Auxiliary cruiser	Captain Francesco De Angelini
Nicola Fabrizi	Kingdom of Italy	La Masa-class destroyer	Damaged

=== Merchant ships ===
Merchant ships
Ship	Year	Flag	GRT	Notes
Antonio Locatelli	1920	Merchant Navy	5,754	Sunk, no survivors
Premuda	1907	Merchant Navy	4,427	Sunk
Capo Vado	1906	Merchant Navy	4,391	Sunk 12 nmi (22 km; 14 mi) off Sazan
MV Catalani	1929	Merchant Navy	2,429	Sunk

=== Royal Navy ===
Force X
Ship	Flag	Class	Notes
HMS Ajax	Royal Navy	Leander-class cruiser	
HMS Orion	Royal Navy	Leander-class cruiser	Rear-Admiral Henry Pridham-Whippell (Vice-Admiral, Light Forces)
HMAS Sydney	Royal Navy	Leander-class cruiser	
HMS Mohawk	Royal Navy	Tribal-class destroyer	
HMS Nubian	Royal Navy	Tribal-class destroyer	
