= Italian destroyer Giuseppe La Farina =

Italian La Masa-class destroyer

History

Kingdom of Italy
- Name: Giuseppe La Farina
- Namesake: Giuseppe La Farina (1815–1863), Italian patriot, essayist, and politician
- Builder: Cantieri navali Odero, Sestri Ponente, Kingdom of Italy
- Laid down: 29 December 1917
- Launched: 12 March 1919
- Completed: 18 March 1919
- Commissioned: 19 March 1919
- Reclassified: Torpedo boat 1929
- Identification: Pennant number LF
- Fate: Sunk 4 May 1941

General characteristics (as built)
- Type: Destroyer
- Displacement: 785 long tons (798 t) (standard); 851 long tons (865 t) (full load)
- Length: 72.5 m (237 ft 10 in) (waterline)
- Beam: 7.3 m (23 ft 11 in)
- Draught: 2.8 m (9 ft 2 in)
- Installed power: 15,500 shp (11,558 kW); maximum 17,000 shp (12,677 kW)
- Propulsion: 2 × Tosi steam turbines; 4 × Thornycroft boilers
- Speed: 33.6 knots (62.2 km/h; 38.7 mph)
- Range: 2,230 nmi (4,130 km; 2,570 mi) at 12.5 knots (23.2 km/h; 14.4 mph); 410 nmi (759 km; 472 mi) at 28.5 knots (52.8 km/h; 32.8 mph)
- Complement: 4 officers, 74 non-commissioned officers and sailors
- Armament: 4 × 102 mm (4 in)/45 guns; 2 × 76.2 mm (3 in)/40 AA; 4 × 450 mm (18 in) torpedo tubes; 10 mines

Giuseppe La Farina was an Italian La Masa-class destroyer. Commissioned into service in the Italian Regia Marina ("Royal Navy") in 1919, she participated in operations related to the Corfu incident in 1923. Reclassified as a torpedo boat in 1929, she took part in the Mediterranean campaign of World War II until she was sunk in 1941.

== Construction and commissioning ==
Giuseppe La Farina was laid down at the Cantieri navali Odero (English: Odero Shipyard) in Sestri Ponente, Italy, on 29 December 1917. She was launched on 12 March 1919 and completed on 18 March 1919. She was commissioned on 19 March 1919.

== Service history ==
=== 1919–1940 ===
During the Corfu incident between Italy and the Kingdom of Greece, a force composed of Giuseppe La Farina, the battleships Conte di Cavour and Giulio Cesare, the armored cruisers San Giorgio and San Marco, the destroyers Generale Antonio Cascino, Generale Carlo Montanari, Giacinto Carini, and Giacomo Medici, the torpedo boat Premuda, the coastal torpedo boats 50 OS and 53 AS, the motor torpedo boats MAS 401, MAS 404, MAS 406, and MAS 408, and the submarines Agostino Barbarigo and Andrea Provana departed Taranto, Italy, on the evening of 30 August 1923 bound for Corfu with orders to occupy the island. The Italian ships arrived off Corfu on 31 August and communicated to the Greek governor of the island the conditions of surrender, which required lowering of the Greek flag and raising the Italian flag over the island, disarming all Greek soldiers and gendarmes, ceasing all communications, and ceding control of all activities on the island to Italian authorities. Not receiving a satisfactory answer to these damands, the Italian ships opened fire at 16:00, bombarding the Old Fortress and the New Fortress for 15 minutes. Refugees had taken shelter there, and the Italian bombardment killed 10 of them and injured several others. The Greek governor then surrendered and the Italian expeditionary force — made up of sailors from the Italian ships, the Italian Royal Army's 48th Infantry Regiment "Ferrara" (equipped with a battery of eight 75 mm guns), and an infantry brigade of 5,000 men — landed on Corfu. Most of the ships then returned to Taranto, but Giuseppe La Farina and the other four destroyers as well as one of the armored cruisers, the submarines, and the MAS boats remained at Corfu. Once Italy and Greece resolved their disagreement, the rest of the Italian ships and the expeditionary force on the island left Corfu between 24 and 29 September 1923.

In 1929, Giuseppe La Farina and her sister ships Angelo Bassini, Giacinto Carini, and Nicola Fabrizi formed the 5th Destroyer Squadron, which together with the five-ship 6th Destroyer Squadron and the scout cruiser Carlo Mirabello constituted the 3rd Flotilla of the 2nd Torpedo Boat Division, a component of the 2nd Squadron, based at Taranto. Giuseppe La Farina was reclassified as a torpedo boat in 1929.

=== World War II ===
World War II broke out in September 1939 with Nazi Germany's invasion of Poland. Fascist Italy joined the war on the side of the Axis powers with its invasion of France on 10 June 1940. At the time, Giuseppe La Farina was part of the 5th Torpedo Boat Squadron, along with the torpedo boats Albatros, Giuseppe Cesare Abba, Giuseppe Dezza, and Simone Schiaffino. During the war, she mainly served as an escort on the shipping routes between Italy and Libya. On 2 November 1940 she got underway from Tripoli, Libya, escorting the steamers Pallade and Snia Amba. During the voyage, the British submarine HMS Tetrarch torpedoed and damaged Snia Amba off Benghazi, Libya, on 4 November 1940.

Between late 1940 and early 1941 Giuseppe La Farina underwent a revision of her armament which saw the removal of two 102-millimetre (4 in) guns and two torpedo tubes and the replacement of her 76-millimetre (3 in) guns with six 20-millimetre autocannons. On 18 April 1941 she departed Palermo, Sicily, with the torpedo boats Antonio Mosto and Calliope to escort a convoy initially composed of the steamers Isarco, Maddalena Odero, and Nicolò Odero to Tripoli. During the voyage, the tankers Alberto Fassio and Luisiano and torpedo boats Climene and Orione joined the convoy, which reached Tripoli on 21 April 1941.

On 3 May 1941, Giuseppe La Farina got underway from Tripoli to escort Luisiano to Trapani, Sicily. At 05:30 on 4 May she struck a mine off Tunisia near the Kerkennah shallows. The explosion broke her in two at her central funnel, and she sank in less than two minutes at 34°35′N 011°50′E with the loss of 61 of her 128 crew. In all, she had conducted 35 escort missions and 12 antisubmarine patrols during the war.
