= Henry Bousfield (Royal Navy officer) =

Royal Navy admiral

Rear-Admiral Henry Bousfield
- Born: 30 November 1889; Hoole, Cheshire
- Died: 6 November 1947 (aged 57)
- Military career
- Allegiance: United Kingdom
- Branch: Royal Navy
- Service years: 1906–1946
- Rank: Rear-Admiral
- Commands: HMS Manchester; Dover Command
- Conflicts: World War I World War II

Rear-Admiral Henry Hugh Bousfield (30 November 1889 – 6 November 1947) was a Royal Navy who became Commander-in-Chief, Dover.

== Naval career ==
Bousfield joined the Royal Navy in January 1906. He served in the cruiser HMS Skirmisher and then in the battleship HMS King George V during World War I. Promoted to captain in June 1931, he became Senior Naval Officer, Yangtze, in September 1931, captain of the Royal Naval College, Greenwich, in August 1935 and commanding officer of the cruiser HMS Manchester in January 1938: he saw active service in command of the ship during World War II. He retired in July 1941 but was recalled as Commander-in-Chief, Dover, in July 1945 before reverting to retirement in June 1946.

Military offices
Preceded by Henry Pridham-Wippell	Commander-in-Chief, Dover; 1945–1946	Succeeded by Post disbanded
