= Italian destroyer Nicola Fabrizi =

Italian La Masa-class destroyer

History

Kingdom of Italy
- Name: Nicola Fabrizi
- Namesake: Nicola Fabrizi (1804–1885), Italian soldier, patriot and politician
- Builder: Cantieri navali Odero, Sestri Ponente, Kingdom of Italy
- Laid down: 1 September 1916
- Launched: 8 July 1918
- Completed: 12 July 1918
- Commissioned: 12 July 1918
- Reclassified: Torpedo boat 1929
- Identification: Pennant number FB (1917–1954)
- Motto: Pari ai cimenti superiore alla fortuna (Equal to Trials, Superior to Luck)
- Fate: To Italian Republic 1946

Italian Republic
- Reclassified: Coastal minesweeper 1953
- Stricken: 1 February 1957
- Identification: Pennant number M 5333 (1954–1958)
- Fate: Scrapped

General characteristics (as built)
- Type: Destroyer
- Displacement: 785 long tons (798 t) (standard); 851 long tons (865 t) (full load)
- Length: 72.5 m (237 ft 10 in) (waterline)
- Beam: 7.3 m (23 ft 11 in)
- Draught: 2.8 m (9 ft 2 in)
- Installed power: 15,500 shp (11,558 kW); maximum 17,000 shp (12,677 kW)
- Propulsion: 2 × Tosi steam turbines; 4 × Thornycroft boilers
- Speed: 33.6 knots (62.2 km/h; 38.7 mph)
- Range: 2,230 nmi (4,130 km; 2,570 mi) at 12.5 knots (23.2 km/h; 14.4 mph); 410 nmi (759 km; 472 mi) at 28.5 knots (52.8 km/h; 32.8 mph)
- Complement: 4 officers, 74 non-commissioned officers and sailors
- Armament: As built: 4 × 102 mm (4 in)/45 guns; 2 × 76.2 mm (3 in)/40 AA; 4 × 450 mm (18 in) torpedo tubes; 10 mines

Nicola Fabrizi was an Italian La Masa-class destroyer. Commissioned into service in the Italian Regia Marina ("Royal Navy") in 1918, she served in the final months of World War I, participating in the Adriatic campaign. She was reclassified as a torpedo boat in 1929. After Fascist Italy entered World War II, she served mainly in the Adriatic campaign as a convoy escort in the Adriatic Sea, taking part in the Action in the Strait of Otranto in 1940. She also served in the Mediterranean campaign. After the fall of Fascist Italy and the Italian armistice with the Allies in 1943, she switched to the Allied side and operated as a unit of the Italian Co-belligerent Navy until 1945. A part of the Italian Navy (Marina Militare) after the Italian Republic replaced the Kingdom of Italy in 1946, she remained in service during the Cold War and was reclassified as a minesweeper in 1953. Stricken in 1957, she subsequently was scrapped.

== Construction and commissioning ==
Nicola Fabrizi was laid down at the Cantieri navali Odero (English: Odero Shipyard) in Sestri Ponente, Italy, on 1 September 1916. She was launched on 8 July 1918 and completed and commissioned on 12 July 1918.

== Service history ==
=== World War I ===
Nicola Fabrizi entered service in time to participate in the final months of World War I, taking part in the Adriatic campaign. By late October 1918, Austria-Hungary had effectively disintegrated, and the Armistice of Villa Giusti, signed on 3 November 1918, went into effect on 4 November 1918 and brought hostilities between Austria-Hungary and the Allies to an end. On 3 November, Nicola Fabrizi got underway from Venice with the destroyers Audace, Giuseppe La Masa, and Giuseppe Missori and rendezvoused with the torpedo boats Climene and Procione, which had departed Cortellazzo. The Italian ships then proceeded to Trieste, which they reached at 16:10. The ships disembarked 200 members of the Carabinieri and General Carlo Petitti di Roreto, who proclaimed Italy's annexation of the city to a cheering crowd in a celebration of the unification of Trieste with Italy. World War I ended with an armistice between the Allies and the German Empire on 11 November 1918.

=== Interwar period ===
In 1929, Nicola Fabrizi and her sister ships Angelo Bassini, Giacinto Carini, and Giuseppe La Farina formed the 5th Destroyer Squadron, which together with the five-ship 6th Destroyer Squadron and the scout cruiser Carlo Mirabello constituted the 3rd Flotilla of the 2nd Torpedo Boat Division, a component of the 2nd Squadron, based at Taranto, Italy. Nicola Fabrizi was reclassified as a torpedo boat in 1929.

=== World War II ===
World War II broke out in September 1939 with Nazi Germany's invasion of Poland. Fascist Italy joined the war on the side of the Axis powers with its invasion of France on 10 June 1940. At the time, Nicola Fabrizi was based at Brindisi, Italy, as part of the 7th Torpedo Boat Squadron, which also included the torpedo boats Angelo Bassini, Enrico Cosenz, and Giacomo Medici. Taking pert in the Adriatic campaign, she operated mainly on escort duty along the shipping routes in the Adriatic Sea.

In October 1940, Nicola Fabrizi was assigned temporarily to the Forza Navale Speciale (Special Naval Force). Tasked with occupying Corfu, the force, commanded by Ammiraglio di squadra (Squadron Admiral) Vittorio Tur, also included the light cruiser Bari (Tur's flagship), the light cruiser Taranto, the destroyers Augusto Riboty and Carlo Mirabello, the torpedo boats Altair, Andromeda, Angelo Bassini, Antares, Aretusa, and Giacomo Medici, and the tankers Garigliano, Sesia, and Tirso. Plans called for merchant ships to land the Royal Army's 47th Infantry Division "Bari" and a battalion of the Regia Marina′s Regiment "San Marco" on Corfu on 28 October 1940 — the day the Greco–Italian War broke out with Italy's invasion of Greece — but the amphibious landing was postponed due to rough seas, first to 30 October, then to 31 October, and then again to 2 November before it was cancelled because of the disappointing performance of Italian forces on the Greek front. The 47th Infantry Division "Bari" was reassigned to operations on the front in Epirus, and the merchant ships proceeded to Vlorë (known to the Italians as Valona) in the Italian protectorate of Albania to disembark the division there.

At 22:30 on 11 November 1940, Nicola Fabrizi, under the command of reserve Tenente di vascello (Ship-of-the-Line Lieutenant) Giovanni Barbini got underway from Vlorë with the auxiliary cruiser Ramb III to escort a convoy of four merchant ships — the cargo steamers Antonio Locatelli, Capo Vado, and Premuda and the passenger motor ship Catalani — to Italy. Meanwhile, the British Royal Navy sent its 7th Cruiser Division — consisting of the British light cruisers HMS Ajax and HMS Orion, the Royal Australian Navy light cruiser HMAS Sydney, and the British destroyers HMS Mohawk and HMS Nubian — into the Strait of Otranto to attack Italian convoys and divert Italian attention from the British carrier air raid on Taranto, which also took place that night. The Italian convoy was proceeding at 8 knots (15 km/h; 9.2 mph) when the British and Italian forces sighted each other at 01:15 on 12 November. The resulting Action in the Strait of Otranto began when the British opened fire at around 01:25, and soon all four merchant ships either were burning or had sunk. Ramb III fired 17 rounds, then withdrew in the face of the overwhelming British superiority to avoid her own destruction. Nicola Fabrizi, however, attempted a bold counterattack, closing with the British to make a torpedo attack. She took repeated shell hits, especially from Orion, but nonetheless closed the range, only to find that the British gunfire had put her torpedo tubes out of action. Despite this, Barbini, suffering from a serious leg wound, decided to continue the attack, and Nicola Fabrizi opened fire with her 102-millimetre (4 in) guns to try to distract the British from the convoy. In an extreme attempt to divert the British from attacking the convoy, he went so far as to take his ship toward the Italian defensive minefields close to the Albanian coast, trying to lure the British ships onto the mines. However, the British, having completed the annihilation of the convoy at 01:53, did not pursue Nicola Fabrizi and instead withdrew at full speed. Heavily damaged and on fire, with 11 of her crew killed and 17 wounded, Nicola Fabrizi returned to Vlorë. Barbini, who had refused to be treated for his wounds until the end of the fight and had maintained command of his ship until reaching port, was awarded the Gold Medal of Military Valor for his actions.

Sometime in 1941 or 1942, Nicola Fabrizi underwent a revision of her armament which saw the removal of one 102-millimetre (4 in) gun and the replacement of her 76-millimetre (3 in) guns with six 20-millimetre autocannons. On 30 January Nicola Fabrizi, Angelo Bassini, and the auxiliary cruiser Brindisi left Brindisi at 02:00 to escort the steamer Argentina and the motor ship Città di Marsala — carrying a combined 1,230 men, 12 motor vehicles, and 234 tonnes (230 long tons; 258 short tons) of artillery pieces, clothing, ammunition, military supplies, and other supplies — to Vlorë, where they arrived at 09:30. On 7 September 1941, now operating in the Tyrrhenian Sea, she escorted the merchant ships Livorno and Spezia from Naples to Messina, Sicily.

On 8 September 1943, the Kingdom of Italy announced an armistice with the Allies and switched sides in the war, prompting Nazi Germany to begin Operation Achse, the disarmament by force of the Italian armed forces and the occupation of those portions of Italy not yet under Allied control. Nicola Fabrizi avoided capture and proceeded with her sister ship Giacinto Carini to Malta, where they handed themselves over to the Allies on 21 September 1943. The two ships departed Malta in company with the torpedo boats Aliseo, Animoso, Fortunale, and Indomito on 5 October 1943 and returned to Italy. Nicola Fabrizi subsequently operated on the Allied side as a unit of the Italian Co-belligerent Navy through the end of the war in Europe in May 1945.

=== Post-World War II ===
After the Italian Republic replaced the Kingdom of Italy in 1946, Nicola Fabrizi continued in service in the Italian Navy (Marina Militare). She was reclassified as a minesweeper in 1953. She was stricken on 1 February 1957 and subsequently scrapped.
