= Robert Cunliffe (Royal Navy officer) =

Royal Navy Commodore and Commander-in-Chief, Dover (1895–1990)

Commodore Robert Cunliffe CBE
- Born: 15 March 1895; Woolwich, Kent, England
- Died: 29 November 1990 (aged 95); Pakenham, Suffolk, England
- Military career
- Allegiance: United Kingdom
- Branch: Royal Navy
- Service years: 1912–1946
- Rank: Commodore
- Commands: HMS Milford; Dover Command; HMS Illustrious
- Conflicts: World War I World War II
- Awards: Commander of the Order of the British Empire

Commodore Robert Lionel Brooke Cunliffe CBE (15 March 1895 – 29 November 1990) was a Royal Navy officer who became Commander-in-Chief, Dover.

== Naval career ==
Cunliffe joined the Royal Navy in September 1912. He was present at the Battle of Jutland in June 1916 during the First World War. He became commanding officer of the sloop HMS Milford in December 1937. He also served during the Second World War as Captain of the Royal Naval College, Dartmouth, from December 1939, Commander-in-Chief, Dover, from April 1942 and captain of the aircraft carrier HMS Illustrious from August 1942. He went on to be Commodore, Royal Naval Barracks, Devonport in August 1944 before retiring in January 1946. While serving in the Royal Navy, Cunliffe played first-class cricket for the Royal Navy Cricket Club, making ten appearances between 1914–1929. He scored 335 runs at an average of 20.93, which included three half centuries and a high score of 87. With the ball, he took 16 wickets with his leg break googly bowling, with best figures of 5 for 78.

== Sources ==
- Marder, Arthur (2014). From the Dreadnought to Scapa Flow: Volume III Jutland and After May to December 1916. Seaforth Publishing. ISBN 978-1848322004.

Military offices
| Preceded by Sir Bertram Ramsay | Commander-in-Chief, Dover; 1942 | Succeeded by Henry Pridham-Wippell |
