= Douglas baronets of Carr (1777) =

Escutcheon of the Douglas baronets of Carr

The Douglas baronetcy of Carr, Perthshire was created on 23 January 1777 in the Baronetage of Great Britain for Captain Charles Douglas as a result of his service at Quebec during the American Revolutionary War. Upon his death in 1789, his eldest son William Henry Douglas inherited the title. He was unmarried, and upon his death in 1809, the baronetcy passed to his youngest brother, General Sir Howard Douglas, their middle brother having died as well.

The baronetcy became extinct on the death of the 6th Baronet in 1940.

== Douglas baronets, of Carr (1777) ==
- Admiral Sir Charles Douglas, 1st Baronet (1727–1789)
- Admiral Sir William Henry Douglas, 2nd Baronet of Carr, (28 July 1761 – 24 May 1809) was a British naval officer, the oldest son of Admiral Sir Charles Douglas. His mother was a Dutch woman named Uranie Lydie Marteilhe. He was one of six admirals to carry the canopy at Nelson's funeral. Sir William was unmarried and the baronetcy passed to his younger brother.
- General Sir Howard Douglas, 3rd Baronet (1776–1861), Governor of New Brunswick, Canada, High Commissioner of the Ionian Islands, MP for Liverpool 1842–1847
- Sir Robert Percy Douglas, 4th Baronet (1805–1891), Governor of Jersey
- Sir Arthur Percy Douglas, 5th Baronet (1845–1913), New Zealand Under-Secretary for Defence
- Sir James Stewart Douglas, 6th Baronet (1859–1940). He left no heir, and the title was extinct on his death.

== Notes ==
Baronetage of Great Britain
Preceded by Baker baronets	Douglas baronets of Carr; 23 January 1777	Succeeded by Hood baronets
