= Samuel Hood, 6th Viscount Hood =

British diplomat (1910–1981)

Samuel Hood, 6th Viscount Hood, GCMG (15 October 1910 – 13 October 1981) was a Foreign Office official and diplomat for the United Kingdom.

== Early life and education ==
Hood was born the first son of Rear Admiral Sir Horace Hood and American socialite Ellen Touzalin on 15 October 1910. The family were descendants of Samuel Hood, 1st Viscount Hood, the admiral known for his service in the American and French Revolutionary Wars. Hood's father was also a distinguished naval officer and was killed in action aboard HMS Invincible on 31 May 1916 at the Battle of Jutland during the First World War. The young Hood was educated at Eton and Trinity College, Cambridge. On 26 April 1933, at the age of 22, he succeeded his father's elder brother, Grosvenor Arthur Alexander Hood, as Viscount Hood of Whitley.

== Diplomatic career ==
Hood joined the diplomatic service in 1935 as Assistant Principal in the India Office, attached to the Political Department. In the years 1936–1939 he served as Assistant Private Secretary to the Secretary of State for India, then the Conservative peer Lawrence Dundas, 2nd Marquess of Zetland. He was promoted to Principal Private Secretary on 26 May 1939, but was then transferred to the Ministry of Information in November of the same year, where he served under three Cabinet Ministers, including Duff Cooper. According to John Colville's diaries, Hood found working under Cooper particularly frustrating, labelling him 'very lazy', and that it was 'impossible' for the Ministry to operate with him at the helm. However, Hood established a fruitful working relationship with Cooper's successor Bracken, stating: 'Only when Brendan Bracken became Minister...did the MoI become really efficient and respected.' Hood was moved to the Foreign Office on 16 September 1942. He was a member of the UK delegations to meetings of the Council of Foreign Ministers in London, Paris, New York and Moscow in 1945–1947, including the Paris Peace Conference in 1946.

On 14 January 1947 Hood was appointed as a Foreign Service Officer Grade 7 in the senior branch of the Foreign Office. At the same time he was made deputy to the then Foreign Secretary, Ernest Bevin, in the drafting of the peace treaty with Austria. In June of the same year he was transferred to Madrid, where he was chargé d'affaires of the embassy. Hood then moved to the Paris embassy on 4 July 1948 and was promoted to Foreign Service Officer Grade 6.

On 1 October 1951 Hood was appointed head of the Western Organisation Department and remained there for five years. He was promoted to Grade 4 on 4 September 1956 and made Assistant Under-Secretary at the Foreign Office. In 1956 he was also appointed as the British Permanent Representative to the Council of the Western European Union, and was then transferred to the Washington embassy in 1957, where he was Minister (deputy ambassador) until 1962. In 1956, under Foreign Secretary Selwyn Lloyd, Hood signed the Mutual Defence Agreement with the United States. In 1963 he was transferred back to London and made Deputy Under-Secretary for Western European affairs at the Foreign Office, remaining in this post until his retirement in 1969.

== Later life ==
After his retirement, Hood remained active in public life. He took up his seat in the House of Lords, and in 1971 became Deputy Speaker and Deputy Chairman of Committees of the House, serving until his death in 1981. From 1975 until 1978 he was Chairman of the Advisory Council of the Victoria and Albert Museum.

Upon his death in 1981 he was succeeded to the viscountcy by his younger brother, Alexander Lambert Hood.

== Honours ==
- Appointed CMG in 1953.
- Appointed KCMG in the 1960 Birthday Honours.
- Appointed GCMG in the 1969 Birthday Honours.

Peerage of Great Britain
| Preceded by Grosvenor Hood | Viscount Hood; 1933–1981 | Succeeded by Alexander Hood |
| Preceded by Grosvenor Hood | Baron Hood; 1933–1981 | Succeeded by Alexander Hood |
Peerage of Ireland
| Preceded by Grosvenor Hood | Baron Hood; 1933–1981 | Succeeded by Alexander Hood |
Baronetage of Great Britain
| Preceded by Grosvenor Hood | Baronet of Catherington; 1933–1981 | Succeeded by Alexander Hood |
