= Viscount Hood =

Viscountcy in the Peerage of Great Britain

Viscountcy of Hood
- Arms of Hood: Azure, a fret argent on a chief or three crescents sable; crest: A Cornish chough proper resting the dexter claw on the fluke of an anchor placed in bend sinister; Supporters: dexter: A merman holding in the exterior hand a trident proper; sinister: A mermaid holding in the exterior hand a mirror proper
- Creation date: 1 June 1796
- Created by: George III
- Peerage: Peerage of Great Britain
- First holder: Samuel Hood, 1st Baron Hood
- Present holder: Henry Hood, 8th Viscount Hood
- Heir apparent: The Hon. Archibald Hood
- Remainder to: The 1st Viscount's heirs male of the body lawfully begotten
- Subsidiary titles: Baron Hood (1782 creation); Baron Hood (1795 creation)
- Status: Extant
- Seat: Loders Court
- Motto: VENTIS SECUNDIS (With favourable winds)

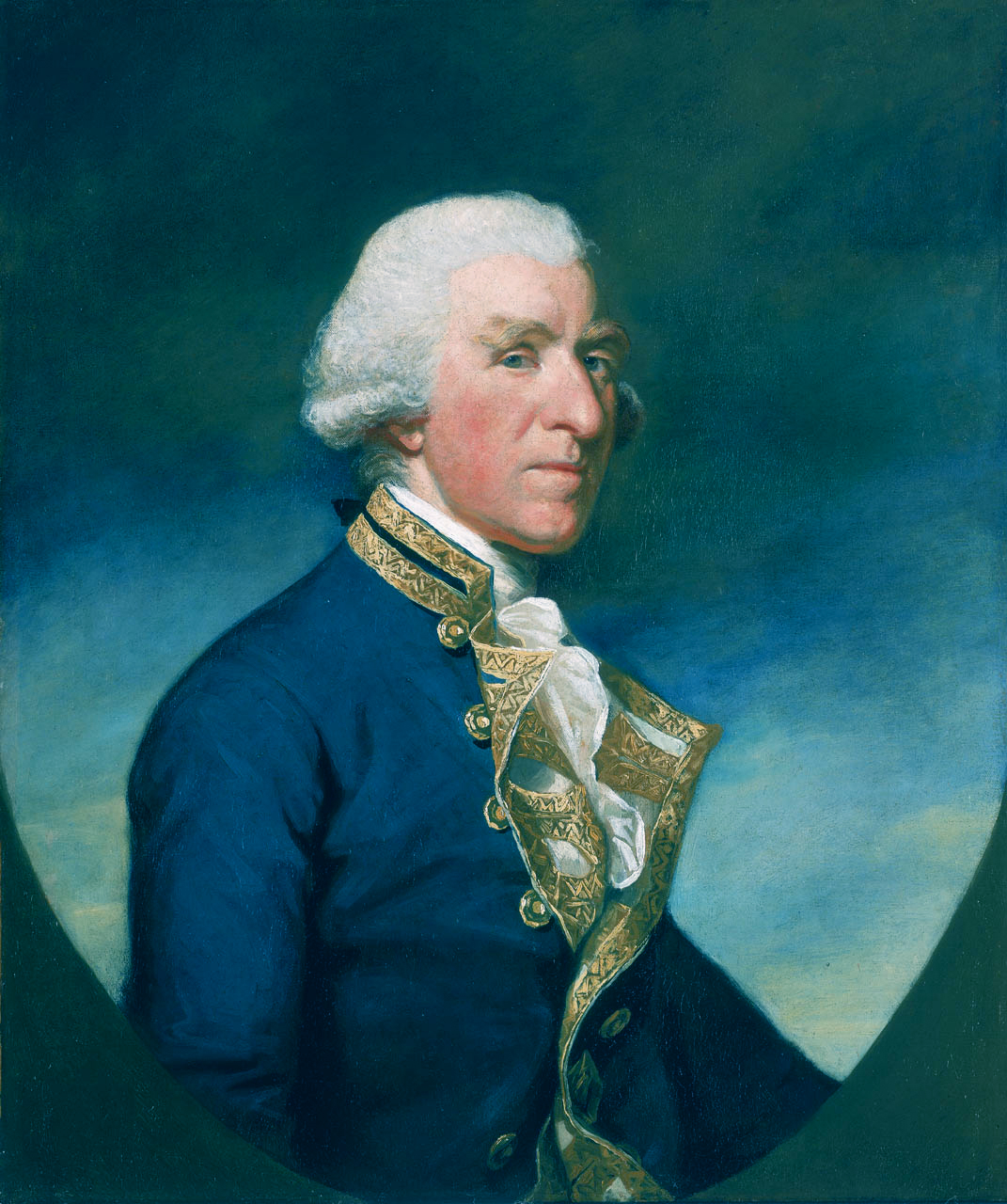
Admiral Samuel Hood, 1st Viscount Hood

Viscount Hood, of Whitley in the County of Warwick, is a title in the Peerage of Great Britain. It was created in 1796 for the famous naval commander Admiral Samuel Hood, 1st Baron Hood. He had already been created a Baronet, of Catherington, in the Baronetage of Great Britain on 20 May 1778, and Baron Hood, of Catherington in the County of Southampton, in the Peerage of Ireland in 1782.

In 1795, his wife Susannah Linzee was created Baroness Hood, of Catherington in the County of Southampton, in her own right, in the Peerage of Great Britain. They were both succeeded by their son Henry, the second viscount. His grandson, the third viscount, assumed in 1840 by royal licence the additional surname of Tibbits, which was that of his father-in-law. His great-grandson, the sixth viscount, was a diplomat and notably served as Minister at the British Embassy in Washington from 1958 to 1962 and as Deputy Under-Secretary of State at the Foreign Office between 1962 and 1969. As of 2013, the titles are held by the latter's nephew, the eighth viscount, who succeeded his father in 1999.

Alexander Hood, 1st Viscount Bridport, was the younger brother of the first Viscount Hood. In 1794, he had been created Baron Bridport in the Peerage of Ireland, with remainder to his great-nephew Samuel Hood, the second son of the second Viscount Hood, who succeeded to the barony on Lord Bridport's death in 1814, while the viscountcy became extinct. In 1868, the latter's son, the third baron, was again created Viscount Bridport (see this title for later history of these peerages). Also, Alexander Hood, uncle of the first Viscount Hood and first Viscount Bridport, was the ancestor of the Fuller-Acland-Hood Baronets of St Audries and the Barons St Audries. Rear-Admiral Sir Horace Hood, younger son of the fourth Viscount Hood, was also a distinguished naval commander.

The family seat is Loders Court, near Bridport, Dorset.

== Hood baronets (1778) ==
- Samuel Hood, 1st Baronet (1724–1816) (created Baron Hood in 1782)

=== Baron Hood (1782) ===
- Samuel Hood, 1st Baron Hood (1724–1816) (created Viscount Hood in 1796)

=== Viscount Hood (1796) ===
- Samuel Hood, 1st Viscount Hood (1724–1816)
- Henry Hood, 2nd Viscount Hood (1753–1836)
  - Lt.Col. Hon. Francis Wheler Hood (1781–1814)
- Samuel Hood-Tibbits, 3rd Viscount Hood (1808–1846)
- Francis Wheler Hood, 4th Viscount Hood (1838–1907)
- Grosvenor Arthur Alexander Hood, 5th Viscount Hood (1868–1933)
- Samuel Hood, 6th Viscount Hood (1910–1981)
- Alexander Lambert Hood, 7th Viscount Hood (1914–1999)
- Henry Lyttelton Alexander Hood, 8th Viscount Hood (born 1958)

The heir apparent is the present holder's son, the Hon. Archibald Lyttelton Samuel Hood (born 1993)

== Baron Hood (1795) ==
- Susannah Hood, 1st Baroness Hood (1726–1806)
- Henry Hood, 2nd Baron Hood (1753–1836) (succeeded as Viscount Hood in 1816)

See above for later holders

== Title succession chart ==
Title succession chart, Hood baronets, Barons Hood (both creations) and Viscounts Hood

Samuel Hood; 1st Viscount Hood; 1st Baron Hood; 1st Baronet; 1724–1816	Susannah Hood; 1st Baroness Hood (née Linzee); 1726–1806
Henry Hood; 2nd Viscount Hood; 1753–1836
Lt.Col. Hon. Francis Hood; 1781–1814
Samuel Hood-Tibbits; 3rd Viscount Hood; 1808–1846
Francis Hood; 4th Viscount Hood; 1838–1907
Hon. Grosvenor Hood; 1867–1868	Grosvenor Hood; 5th Viscount Hood; 1868–1933	R.Adm. Hon. Horace Hood; 1870–1916
Samuel Hood; 6th Viscount Hood; 1910–1981	Alexander Hood; 7th Viscount Hood; 1914–1999
Henry Hood; 8th Viscount Hood born 1958
Hon. Archibald Hood born 1993

== See also ==
- Viscount Bridport
- Baron St Audries

Baronetage of Great Britain
Preceded by Douglas baronets	Hood baronets of Catherington; 20 May 1778	Succeeded by Bickerton baronets
