= Bertram Ramsay =

Royal Navy Admiral; commanded the Dunkirk evacuation (1883–1945)

Admiral Sir Bertram Ramsay KCB KBE MVO
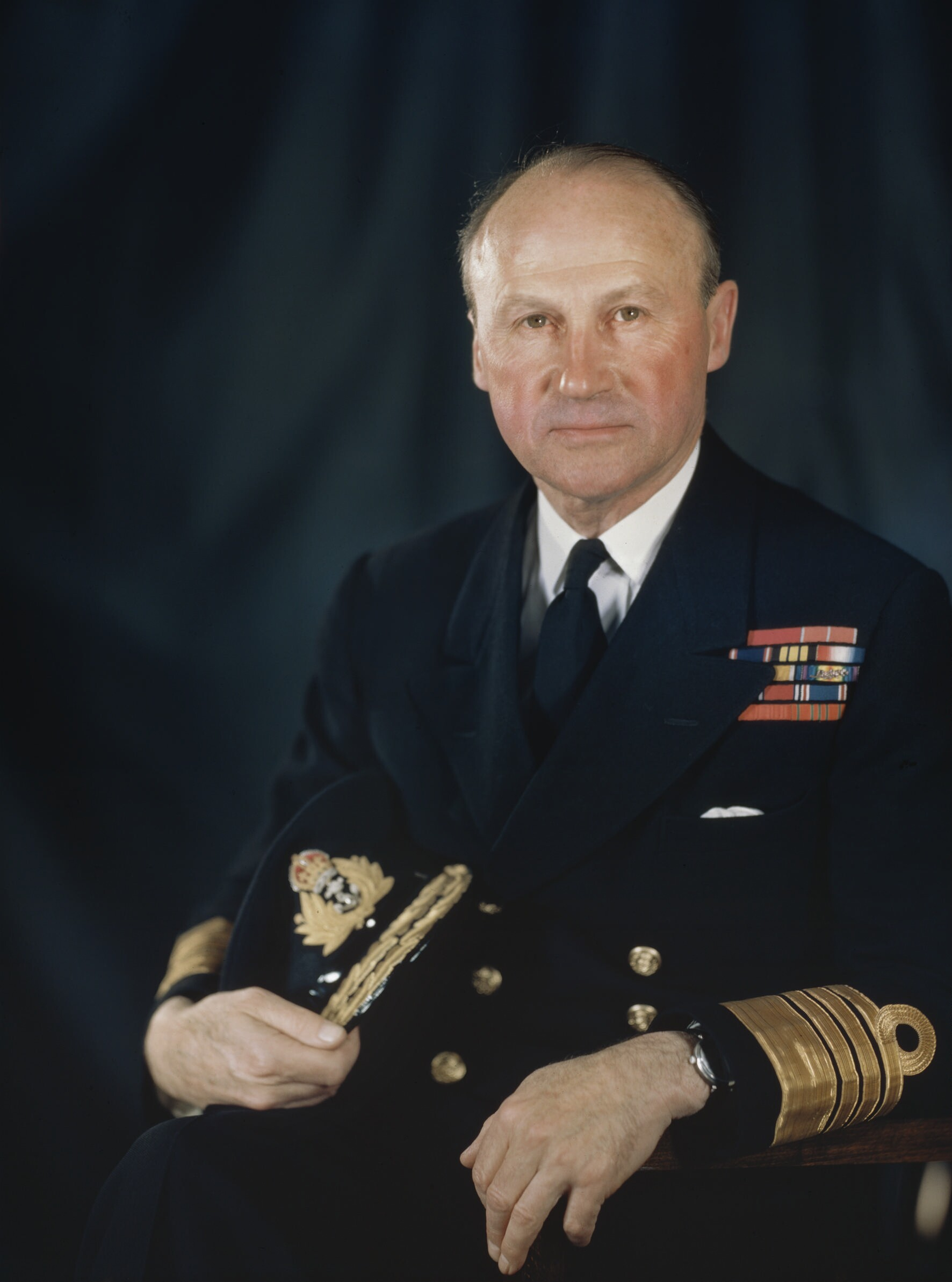
- Official portrait, c. 1939–1945
- Born: Bertram Home Ramsay; 20 January 1883; London, England
- Died: 2 January 1945 (aged 61); Toussus-le-Noble, France
- Cause of death: Plane crash
- Burial place: May, 1995; Saint-Germain-en-Laye, Paris, France
- Education: Colchester Royal Grammar School
- Spouse: Helen Menzies (m. 1929)
- Children: David; Charles
- Military career
- Allegiance: United Kingdom
- Branch: Royal Navy
- Service years: 1898–1945
- Rank: Admiral
- Conflicts: See battles: World War I; Second Ostend Raid; Zeebrugge Raid; World War II; Operation Dynamo; Operation Fuller; Operation Torch; Operation Husky; Operation Overlord; Normandy landings
- Awards: Knight Commander of the Order of the Bath; Knight Commander of the Order of the British Empire; Member of the Royal Victorian Order; Mention in Despatches (two); Légion d'honneur (France); Legion of Merit (United States); Order of Ushakov (USSR)

Admiral Sir Bertram Home Ramsay, KCB, KBE, MVO (20 January 1883 – 2 January 1945) was a Royal Navy officer. He commanded the destroyer HMS Broke during the First World War. In the Second World War, he was responsible for the Dunkirk evacuation in 1940 and planning and commanding the naval forces in the invasion of France in 1944.

== Personal life ==
Ramsay was born in Hampton Court Palace, into an old family (see Ramsay Baronets). He attended Colchester Royal Grammar School.

On 26 February 1929, Ramsay married Helen Margaret Menzies, daughter of Colonel Charles Thomson Menzies. They had two sons,

- David Francis Ramsay (1 October 1933 – 2 January 2021) who wrote two books and had two children, Michael Ramsay and James Ramsay.
- Major General Charles Alexander Ramsay CB OBE (12 October 1936 – 31 December 2017) was educated at the Royal Military Academy Sandhurst and rose to become Director General of the Territorial Army and was a member of the Queen's Body Guard for Scotland.

== Early naval career ==
Ramsay joined the Royal Navy in 1898. As a naval cadet, he was posted to HMS Crescent in April 1899. Later serving on HMS Britannia, he became a midshipman within a year. By the middle of 1902 he was an acting sub-lieutenant, and he was confirmed in this rank on 15 September 1902. He was promoted to lieutenant on 15 December 1904.

The 1911 census reveals him serving as Flag Lieutenant to Rear Admiral Douglas Gamble on HMS Bacchante in the Mediterranean. The ship was captained at the time by Reginald Tyrwhitt.

== First World War ==
During the First World War, Ramsay was given his first command, HMS M25, a small monitor, in August 1915. For two years his ship was part of the Dover Patrol off the Belgian coast. Promoted to commander on 30 June 1916, in October 1917 he took command of another Dover Patrol vessel, the destroyer HMS Broke. On 9 May 1918, his ship took part in the Second Ostend Raid, a follow-up to the Zeebrugge Raid, for which he was mentioned in despatches.

== Between the wars ==
In 1935 Ramsay resigned his post as Chief of Staff to Sir Roger Backhouse C-in-C, Home Fleet who had refused to delegate his authority.

== Second World War ==
Ramsay retired from the navy in 1938, but was coaxed out of retirement by Winston Churchill one year later to help deal with the Axis threat. Promoted to vice-admiral, he was named Commander-in-Chief, Dover, on 24 August 1939. His duties included overseeing the defence against possible destroyer raids, the protection of cross-Channel military traffic and the denial of the passage through the Straits of Dover by submarines.

=== Operation Dynamo ===
As Vice-Admiral Dover, Ramsay was responsible for the Dunkirk evacuation, codenamed Operation Dynamo. Working from the tunnels beneath Dover Castle, he and his staff worked for nine days straight to rescue troops trapped in France by the German forces. For his success in bringing home 338,226 British and allied soldiers from the mole and beaches of Dunkirk, he was asked to personally report on the operation to King George VI and was made a Knight Commander of the Order of the Bath.

=== Defending Dover ===
After Operation Dynamo was completed, he was faced with the enormous problems of defending the waters off Dover from the expected German invasion. For nearly two years, he commanded forces striving to maintain control against the Germans, gaining a second Mention in Despatches. Ramsay was in command when the German battleships Scharnhorst and Gneisenau together with escorts passed through the Channel in February 1942. Though the British had made plans to deal with this (Operation Fuller), British forces were taken by surprise, and failed in their efforts to stop them.

=== Operation Torch ===
Ramsay was to be appointed the Naval Force Commander for the invasion of Europe on 29 April 1942, but the invasion was postponed and he was transferred to become deputy naval commander of the Allied invasion of North Africa.

=== Operation Husky ===
During the Allied invasion of Sicily (Operation Husky) in July 1943, Ramsay was Naval Commanding Officer, Eastern Task Force, and prepared the amphibious landings.

=== Operation Neptune ===
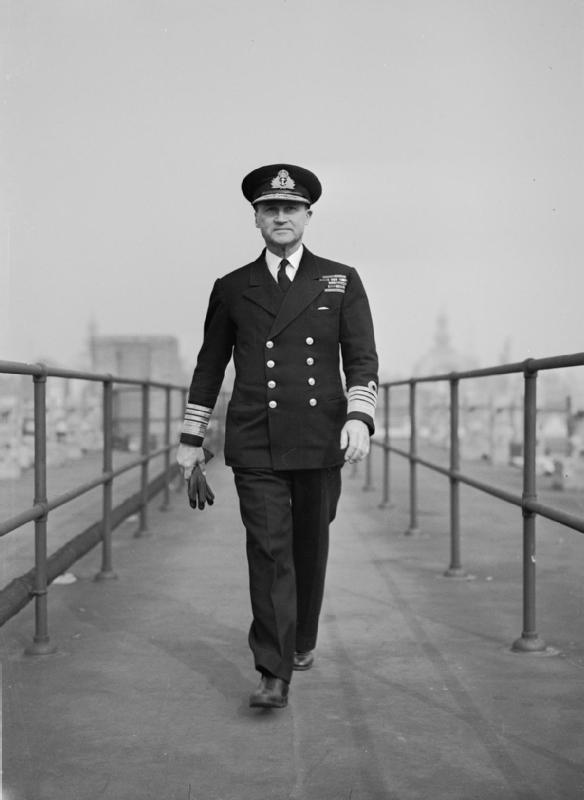
Ramsay in 1944

Ramsay was reinstated to the Active List on 26 April 1944 and promoted to the rank of admiral on 27 April 1944. He was appointed Naval Commander-in-Chief of the Allied Naval Expeditionary Force for the invasion.

In this, he executed what has been described by historian Correlli Barnett as a "never surpassed masterpiece of planning" — coordinating and commanding a fleet of almost 7,000 vessels to delivering over 160,000 men onto the beaches of Normandy on D-Day alone, with over 875,000 disembarked by the end of June.

He defused a potential conflict between Prime Minister Winston Churchill and the British Sovereign, King George VI, when Churchill informed the King that he intended to observe the D-Day landings from aboard HMS Belfast, a cruiser assigned to bombardment duties for the operation. The King, himself a seasoned sailor and a veteran of the Battle of Jutland in the First World War, likewise announced that he would accompany his Prime Minister. The two were at civil loggerheads until meeting with Admiral Ramsay, who flatly refused to take responsibility for the safety of either of them. Ramsay cited the danger to both the King and the Prime Minister, the risks of the planned operational duties of HMS Belfast, and the fact that both the King and Churchill would be needed at home in case the landings went badly and immediate decisions were required. This settled the matter and both Churchill and King George VI remained ashore on D-Day.

While the port of Antwerp was vital for the Allies after D-Day, Admirals Cunningham and Ramsay warned SHAEF and Montgomery that the port was of no use while the Germans held the approaches; saying it would be of much use as Timbuktu! But Montgomery postponed the Battle of the Scheldt, and the delay in opening the port was a grave blow to the Allied build-up before winter approached.

=== Death ===
On 2 January 1945, Ramsay was killed along with four other people on board when his plane crashed on takeoff at Toussus-le-Noble Airport southwest of Paris. He was en route to a conference with Field Marshal Bernard Montgomery in Brussels. Ramsay was interred in Saint-Germain-en-Laye New Communal Cemetery. A memorial to all those who died in the crash was erected at Toussus-le-Noble in May 1995.

== Awards ==
- Mentioned in Despatches – 1918, 1940
- Knight Commander of the Bath (KCB) – 1940
- Knight Commander of the Order of the British Empire (KBE)
- Member of the Royal Victorian Order (MVO)
- Grand Officier of the Légion d'honneur
- Chief Commander of the Legion of Merit (United States) For gallant and distinguished service whilst in command of the invasion operations on Normandy
- Order of Ushakov, First Class (USSR) – 1944

== Legacy ==
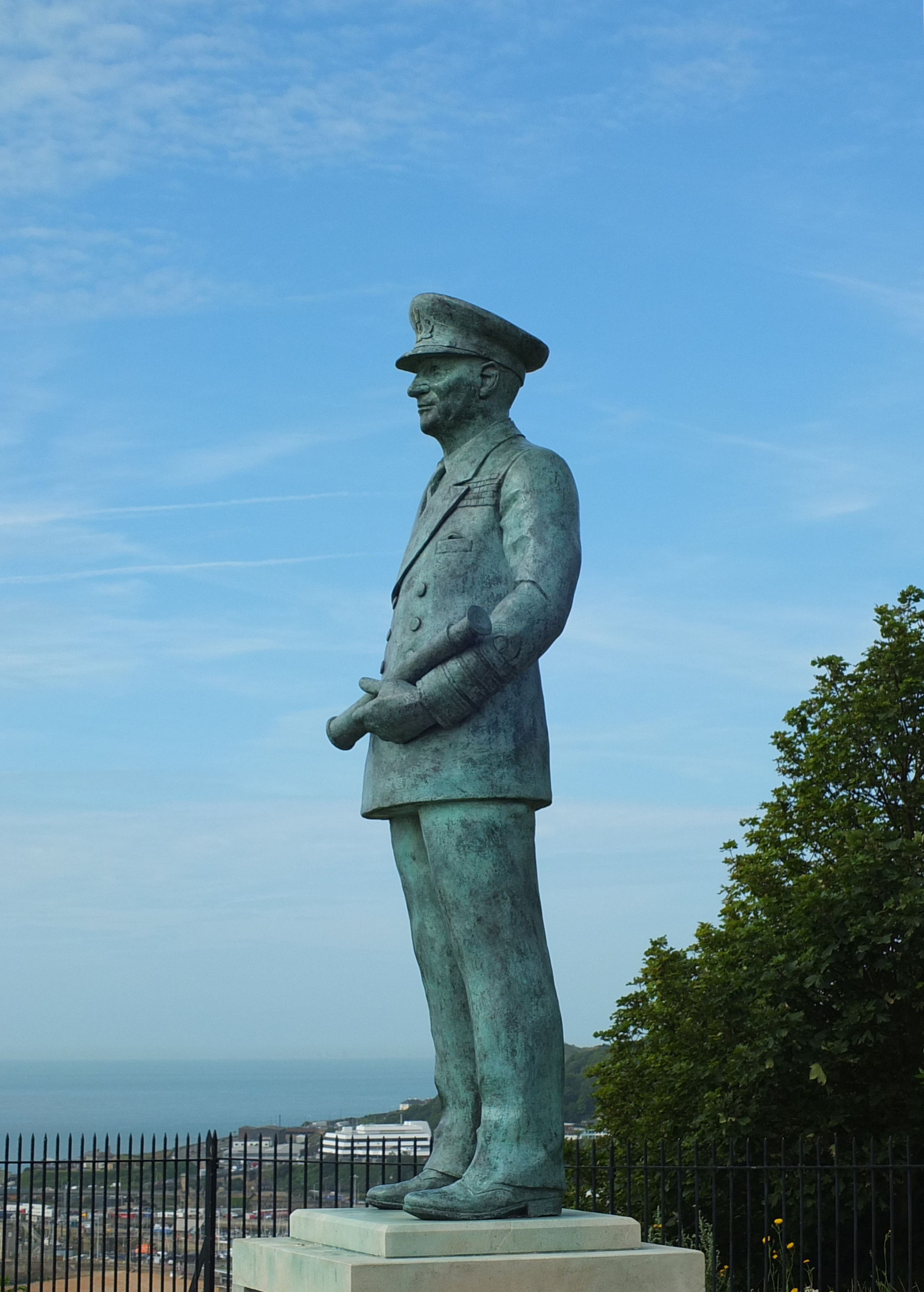
Statue of Ramsay in the grounds of Dover Castle

A statue of Ramsay was erected in November 2000 at Dover Castle, close to where he had planned the Dunkirk evacuation. His name also appears on the Colchester Royal Grammar School war memorial and a portrait hangs in the school. A secondary school in Middlesbrough was named in his honour, but has since been renamed at least twice.

In February 2020, the Scottish Borders Council announced plans to build a museum at the family home of Admiral Ramsay. "A former garden store will be converted at Bughtrig House in Coldstream to create the museum in his honour," BBC News reported.

Admiral Ramsay's legacy has been remembered by the Royal Navy; they have used his name for the Apprenticeship Centre at HMS Collingwood in Fareham, the Ramsay Building which was opened by his son in March 2012.

=== Portrayals ===
- Nicholas Hannen (1958) Dunkirk
- John Robinson (1962) The Longest Day
- Noel Johnson (1979) Churchill and the Generals
- Richard Bremmer (2004) Dunkirk
- Kevin J. Wilson (2004) Ike: Countdown to D-Day
- Michael Mackenzie (2014, 2018) Pressure (play)
- George Anton (2017) Churchill
- David Bamber (2017) Darkest Hour
- David Killick (2018, 2023) Pressure (play)
- Robert Portal (2026) Pressure (film)

Military offices
| Preceded by Post created | Commander-in-Chief, Dover; 1939–1942 | Succeeded by Robert Cunliffe |
