= Commander-in-Chief, Dover =

- Active: 1939–June 1946
- Country: United Kingdom
- Branch: Royal Navy
- Type: military formation
- Garrison/HQ: Dover

The Commander in Chief, Dover was an operational commander of the Royal Navy. His subordinate units, establishments, and staff were sometimes informally known as the Dover Command.

== History ==
=== First World War Dover Patrol ===
In late July 1914, with war looming, 12 Tribal-class destroyers arrived at Dover to join the near obsolete destroyers already at anchor in the harbour, most of them built in the late 19th century. These destroyers formed the nucleus of the fledgling Dover Patrol, which, from its early beginnings as a modest and poorly equipped command, became one of the most important Royal Navy commands of the First World War. The command was instituted on 12 October 1914 under the command of Rear Admiral Sir Horace Hood.

Following the extra strain thrown on the Admiral of Patrols Rear Admiral George Alexander Ballard and his staff caused by the beginning of mine laying and the evacuation of Antwerp, the Admiralty decided to create a separate command encompassing the patrols from the naval base at Dover, the naval base itself, and the Downs Boarding Flotilla. Command was transferred to Rear-Admiral Hood on 11 October, and he hoisted his flag on 13 October. He was given the title of Rear-Admiral Commanding the Dover Patrol and Senior Naval Officer Commanding, Dover, with the short title "Rear-Admiral, Dover Patrol".

The Dover Patrol operated continuously through the end of the war, with its strength consisting primarily of the Sixth Destroyer Flotilla, the Fifth Submarine Flotilla, the Downs Boarding Flotilla, and at times a collection of monitors. Its primary mission was to monitor barriers and defences at the eastern end of the English Channel to prevent U-boats from gaining access to western areas. It also harassed German fortifications on the coast of occupied Belgium.

=== Second World War ===
In 1939, like Rosyth, and Orkneys and Shetlands, the command was re-established/expanded to control and protect sea traffic in the Straits of Dover. It was formed by removing the Straits from Nore Command. Its function was to protect the supply lines to France.

Its primary role failed disastrously during its supervision of the evacuation from Dunkirk code-named Operation Dynamo.

In May 1940 Rear-Admiral Frederic Wake-Walker was appointed rear-admiral in command of all ships and vessels off the Franco-Belgian coast for the evacuation of Dunkirk. Wake-Walker reached Dunkirk in the minesweeper HMS Hebe on 30 May. On 1 June his flagship, the destroyer HMS Keith, was sunk by Ju 87 Stukas, and he thereafter directed operations from the motor torpedo boat MTB 102 in the harbour. For his role in the evacuation he was appointed Companion of the Bath.

Once the threat of a German invasion subsided in 1941, its continued existence as a separate command from Nore Command was perceived by some quarters as more to do with prestige. The command played a prominent part in the Normandy landings.

== Senior officers ==
=== Commander-in-Chief and Flag Officer-in-Charge, Dover ===
- Vice Admiral Sir Bertram Home Ramsay (retired), 24 August 1939 – April 1942
- Commodore Robert Cunliffe, 23 April 1942 – 1 August 1942
- Vice Admiral Henry Pridham-Wippell, 1 August 1942 – June 1944
- Admiral Sir Henry Pridham-Wippell, June 1944 – 10 July 1945
- Rear Admiral Henry Hugh Bousfield, (retired), 10 July 1945 – June 1946

==== Captain Superintendent, Dover ====
- Captain. F. A. H. Russell, 16 December 1940 – June 1944.

==== Senior Naval Officer, Dunkirk ====
- Captain W. G. Tennant, May–June 1940

==== Chief Staff Officer ====
- Captain. A. Day, 31 August 1939 – August 1942.
- Captain. H.St.L. Nicolson, 27 December–June 1944.

==== Sub-Area commands ====
===== Flag Officer, Dungeness =====
- Vice-Admiral William Fortescue Sells, (retired), 6 June 1944.

===== Senior Naval Officer, Selsey =====
- Rear-Admiral Fischer Burges Watson, (retired), May - 6 June 1944.

===== Naval Officer-in-Charge, Ramsgate =====
Post holders included:

- Captain W.R. Phillimore, 1939 -1940.
- Captain. A.F.W. Howard, 16 September 1940 – June 1944.

===== Senior Naval Officer-in-Charge, Folkestone =====
- Vice-Admiral Charles Wolfran Round-Turner, 1940 - 1944

== Components ==
Components were not all permanently stationed at Dover; they were regularly reassigned by the Admiralty.

The base ship and headquarters at Dover was HMS Lynx, which paid off in 1946. Shore establishments included those at Dungess, Ramsgate, Selsey, the Dover dockyard, and HM Coastal Force Base, Folkestone.

Squadrons and flotillas

- 2nd Motor Gun Boat Flotilla
- 2nd Motor Torpedo Boat Flotilla
- 3rd Submarine Flotilla, June 1914 – 1919
- 4th Submarine Flotilla, June 1914 – 1919
- 5th Submarine Flotilla, June 1914 – 1919
- 5th Motor Torpedo Boat Flotilla
- 6th Destroyer Flotilla, June 1914 – 1919
- 6th Minesweeper Flotilla, 5 September 1940 – June 1944.
- 9th Motor Torpedo Boat Flotilla
- 11th Motor Torpedo Boat Flotilla
- 12th Motor Torpedo Boat Flotilla
- 14th Motor Gun Boat Flotilla
- 19th Destroyer Flotilla, 9 November 1939 and February 1940 – June 1940.
- 19th Minelayer Flotilla
- 21st Minelayer Flotilla
- 50th Minelayer Flotilla
- 50th Motor Launch Flotilla, 1914–1919
- 51st Motor Torpedo Boat Flotilla
- 59th Motor Torpedo Boat Flotilla
- Downs Boarding Flotilla, 1914–1919

Minesweeper Groups

- Minesweeping Group 46
- Minesweeping Group 61
- Minesweeping Group 125
- Minesweeping Group 126

== Sources ==
- Naval Staff, Training and Staff Duties Division (1924). Naval Staff Monographs (Historical): Fleet Issue. Volume X. Home Waters—Part I. From the Outbreak of War to 27 August 1914. O.U. 5528 (late C.B. 917(H)). Copy at The National Archives. ADM 186/619.
- Naval Staff, Training and Staff Duties Division (1924). Naval Staff Monographs (Historical): Fleet Issue. Volume XI. Home Waters—Part II. September and October 1914. O.U. 5528 A (late C.B. 917(I)). Copy at The National Archives. ADM 186/620.
- Sheldon, Jack (2010). The German Army at Ypres 1914 and the Battle for Flanders. Barnsley: Pen & Sword Military. ISBN 978-1-84884-113-0.
- "Naval-History.net".
- Houterman, Hans; Koppes, Jeroen. "WWII Unit Histories and Officers".
