= Horace Hood =

British admiral (1870–1916)

Rear-Admiral Sir Horace Hood KCB DSO MVO
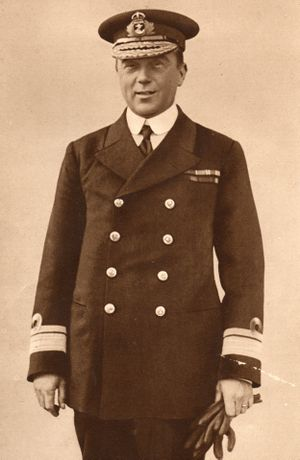
- Rear Admiral Horace Hood c. 1916
- Born: 2 October 1870; London, England
- Died: 31 May 1916 (aged 45); HMS Invincible, North Sea
- Military career
- Allegiance: United Kingdom
- Branch: Royal Navy
- Service years: 1882–1916
- Rank: Rear-Admiral
- Commands: 3rd Battlecruiser Squadron (1915–16); Force E (1915); Dover Command (1914–15); HMS Centurion (1913–14); Royal Naval College, Osborne (1910–13); HMS Commonwealth (1908–09); HMS Berwick (1906–07); HMS Hyacinth (1903–05)
- Conflicts: Mahdist War; Battle of Atbara; Battle of Omdurman; Third Somaliland Expedition; First World War; Western Front; Retreat from Mons; Siege of Antwerp; Race to the Sea; Battle of the Yser; Naval campaign; North Sea campaign; Battle of Jutland †
- Awards: Knight Commander of the Order of the Bath; Distinguished Service Order; Member of the Royal Victorian Order; Mentioned in Despatches

Rear-Admiral Sir Horace Lambert Alexander Hood (2 October 1870 – 31 May 1916) was a British Royal Navy admiral of the First World War, whose lengthy and distinguished service saw him engaged in operations around the world, frequently participating in land campaigns as part of a shore brigade. His early death at the Battle of Jutland in the destruction of his flagship HMS Invincible was met with mourning and accolades from across Britain.

Hood was a youthful, vigorous and active officer whose service in Africa won him the Distinguished Service Order and who was posthumously appointed a Knight Commander of the Order of the Bath in recognition of his courageous and ultimately fatal service in the Battle of Jutland, during which his ship was constantly engaged from its arrival at the action and caused fatal damage to a German light cruiser. He has been described as "the beau ideal of a naval officer, spirited in manner, lively of mind, enterprising, courageous, handsome, and youthful in appearance … His lineage was pure Royal Navy, at its most gallant".

== Early career ==
Horace Hood was descended from one of the most influential and experienced navy lines, being a great-great-grandson of Admiral Samuel Hood, 1st Viscount Hood, who won numerous actions against the French in the American Revolutionary War and the French Revolutionary Wars. His father was Francis Wheler Hood, 4th Viscount Hood, and his mother Edith Lydia Drummond Ward. Born in South Street, London, Hood joined the Royal Navy aged 12, attending HMS Britannia cadet training ship at Dartmouth in 1882. Graduating top of his class in September 1885, Hood joined HMS Temeraire as a midshipman and served on her for a year in the Mediterranean Squadron before joining HMS Minotaur. In 1887 he was attached to HMS Calliope, a small cruiser which sailed for the Pacific Ocean. It was aboard her that Hood experienced the Samoan Hurricane in which Calliope was the only survivor of seven foreign warships in Apia Harbour.

=== African service ===
Hood gained a record score in his exam for lieutenant, and qualified first time. He served in HMS Trafalgar for a time before taking three years out to study gunnery and staff duties. On his return to sea, he spent brief periods aboard HMS Royal Sovereign, HMS Wildfire, HMS Sans Pareil and HMS Cambrian. He performed well at these duties and, in 1897, was recommended to the Egyptian government, which provided him with a Nile gunboat to command on the Nile Expedition of 1898 in the Mahdist War. During these operations, Hood was conspicuous in his duty as second-in-command to Captain David Beatty and saw action for the first time, providing artillery support at the Battle of Atbara and Battle of Omdurman. For his services in these operations, he was promoted to commander, skipping the intermediate rank.

During the Second Boer War, Hood was given command of transport ships taking supplies to South Africa. He was later transferred to Admiral Lord Charles Beresford's flagship HMS Ramillies in the Mediterranean from 9 September 1901. Promoted to captain on 1 January 1903, He was in July that year placed in command of HMS Hyacinth, flagship of Admiral George Atkinson-Willes on the East Indies Station. In April 1904, Hood was given his first independent command as he led a force of 754 sailors, marines and soldiers of the Hampshire Regiment against the Ilig Dervishes of Somaliland. Landing his men on an opposed beach in the dark, Hood led from the front, personally engaging in hand-to-hand combat and driving the dervishes into the hinterland, for which he was awarded the Distinguished Service Order.

Distinguished by his action, Hood was given command of the armoured cruiser HMS Berwick in 1906 and the following year was made naval attaché to the British Embassy in Washington D.C. It was there he met Ellen Touzalin Nickerson, a widowed mother, whom he married in 1910. The couple had two sons, Samuel Hood, 6th Viscount Hood (1910–1981) and Alexander Lambert Hood, 7th Viscount Hood (1914–1999). In 1908, Hood was given command of the pre-dreadnought battleship HMS Commonwealth, in which he served for a year before receiving a shore appointment to command the Royal Naval College, Osborne, where he stayed until 1913 when he was raised to flag rank. For three months Hood raised his flag in the dreadnought battleship HMS Centurion before becoming Naval Secretary to the First Lord of the Admiralty, Winston Churchill, in July 1914.

== First World War ==
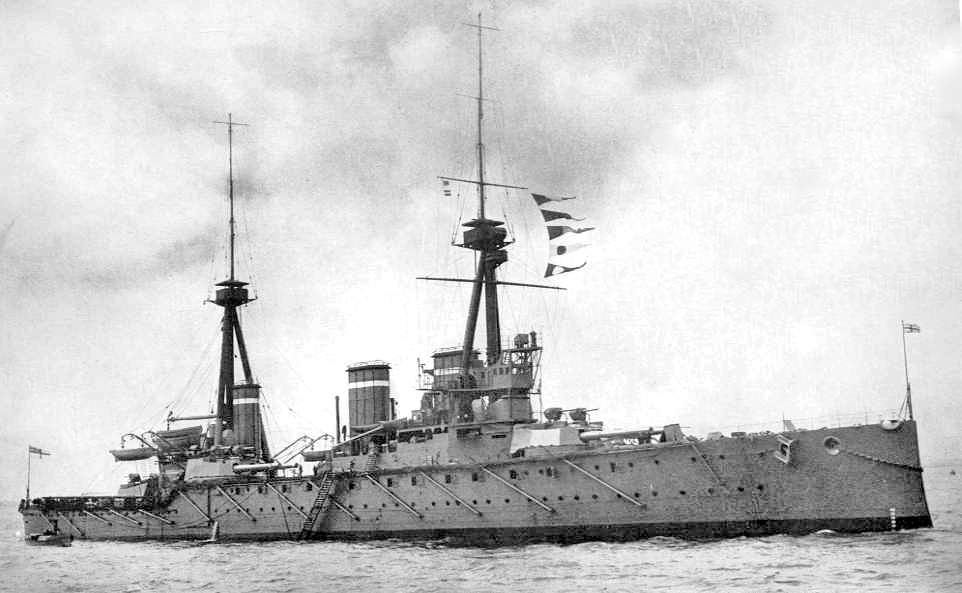
HMS Invincible

At the outbreak of the First World War, Hood's experience with coastal operations recommended him to serve with a small flotilla of Humber-class monitors on the Belgian coast, bombarding German positions and troop formations during the Siege of Antwerp and then the Battle of the Yser, assisting Belgian forces to hold the coastline during the Race for the Sea.

Later in the year, Hood became Commander-in-Chief, Dover and commander of the Dover Patrol, tasked with preventing German ships and submarines passing through. He was transferred to command of Force E at Queenstown by orders of Churchill and Fisher, for his perceived failure to do this as submarines continued to pass the Channel to threaten shipping in the Irish Sea. Force E consisted of obsolete cruisers and boarding vessels whose task was to patrol the area south west of Ireland to give instructions to arriving merchant vessels and guard against attacks by armed merchantmen. In February their operating area had been moved 200 miles further west as they were considered in themselves to be tempting targets for submarines. After his transfer, intelligence reports based on intercepted messages from German submarines showed that they had indeed had extreme difficulty passing the Channel, and as a result their orders were changed to travel around Scotland instead. Before Churchill was replaced as First Lord he corrected his mistake by appointing Hood to command of the newly formed 3rd Battlecruiser Squadron operating out of Rosyth in Scotland. Hood's command was the three battlecruisers of the Invincible class: HMS Indomitable, HMS Inflexible and his flagship HMS Invincible.

In late May 1916 came the only opportunity for the British battlefleet to engage the German main force at the Battle of Jutland. Hood's squadron was attached to Jellicoe's main battlefleet and thus had not witnessed the destruction of two British battlecruisers at the guns of their German counterparts. Arriving as the action was well underway but ahead of the main fleet by advantage of their greater speed, Hood's force's first action was to rescue the light cruiser HMS Chester, which had been separated from the main fleet to provide a signal relay but was then ambushed by four German cruisers and was in danger of sinking. Hood's timely arrival scattered the German ships and caused fatal damage to SMS Wiesbaden, which sank later that night with 589 of her crew.

Hood's intervention had far greater effects than were realised at the time however. In diverting his squadron to the North-West to aid Chester, Hood had inadvertently confused the German battlecruiser commander Admiral Hipper into believing that the main British force was approaching from the North-West and prompting his withdrawal to the main German fleet, an act which has been claimed saved the British battlecruiser fleet from destruction. Hood meanwhile attached his squadron to the British battlecruiser squadron of Admiral Beatty and with them formed the vanguard of the British battlefleet, which was now heading directly for the approaching Germans.

=== Destruction of HMS Invincible ===
Invincible explodes after being hit by a shell from Derfflinger

The vanguards of the battlefleets, made up of battlecruisers and smaller ships, collided just before 18.00. The German fleet, possessing better gunnery and range-finding equipment, had the better of the early exchanges; HMS Defence, an old armoured cruiser which was the flagship of Rear-Admiral Sir Robert Arbuthnot and was captained by Stanley Venn Ellis, was blown up with all 903 hands, and the fast battleship HMS Warspite was badly damaged and forced to limp back to Britain. Hood's squadron was heavily engaged, Invincible facing the combined batteries of SMS Lützow and SMS Derfflinger and inflicting damage on Lützow, which would force her abandonment and scuttling during the night. At this, Hood called through the voicepipe to the gunnery officer, "Keep firing as quickly as possible. You are doing splendidly; every shot is telling." The combination of the two ships proved too much for Hood's flagship, however, and a shell from Derfflinger penetrated the "Q" turret of Invincible, the same mortal wound which had destroyed HMS Queen Mary a few hours before and almost claimed HMS Lion.

The unstable cordite ammunition carried by Invincible, coupled with the weakness of her turret design and armour, resulted in a catastrophic explosion from "Q" turret's magazine, which blew the ship in half. The ship's remains sank rapidly, settling on the shallow bottom while the bow and stern protruded from the sea. Of Invincible's crew of 1,021, there were just six survivors, pulled from the water by attendant destroyers. Hood was not amongst them. The Battle of Jutland was ultimately an expensive stalemate; both sides suffered further losses during the night action but the strategic situation remained unchanged. The Royal Navy had suffered over 6,000 fatal casualties, three times the German losses, but remained in control of the North Sea while the High Seas Fleet was forced to retire to harbour.

=== Remembrance ===
As with his lost shipmates, Hood's body was never recovered and remains in the wreckage of HMS Invincible at the bottom of the North Sea. The wreck is now a protected war grave, although it has suffered from the attentions of looters. Hood's name, with all those lost on Invincible, is inscribed on the Portsmouth War Memorial administered by the Commonwealth War Graves Commission. Admiral Hood was posthumously appointed a Knight Commander of the Order of the Bath. He had previously been made a Member of the Royal Victorian Order. His collected papers were donated by his family, with those of his ancestor Samuel Hood, to the Churchill Archives Centre in 1967. In 1918, Hood's widow was asked to launch the ill-fated battlecruiser HMS Hood, named after Horace Hood's ancestor, which was lost in the Second World War fighting the Bismarck. She was sunk with the loss of 1,415 hands when a shell detonated an after magazine. Hood's name is inscribed on the War Memorial at St Botolph's Church, Barton Seagrave, Northamptonshire.

== Notes ==
Military offices
Preceded by Dudley de Chair	Naval Secretary; August–October 1914	Succeeded by Henry Oliver
New command	Rear-Admiral, Dover Patrol; 1914–1915	Succeeded by Sir Reginald Bacon
