= Elcot Park Hotel =

The Retreat at Elcot Park
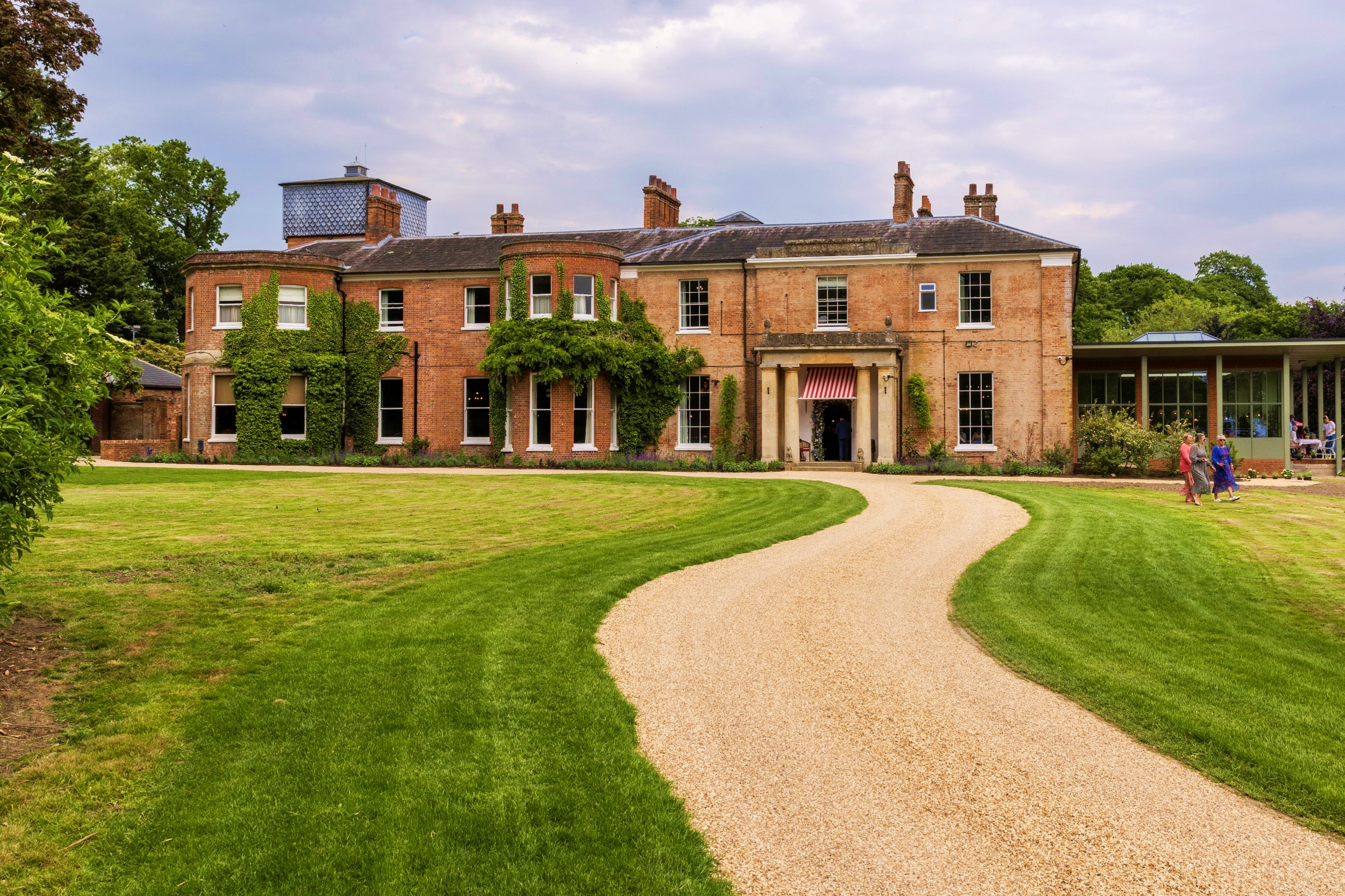
- The Retreat at Elcot Park, June 2022

- Location within Berkshire Location within England

General information
- Location: England, Berkshire
- Coordinates: 51.4207°N 1.4301°W
- OS grid: SU397696

The Retreat at Elcot Park is a hotel housed in a Grade II-listed 18th-century building located near Kintbury, between Hungerford and Newbury, The Retreat is a 55 bedroom hotel set in 16 acres (6.5 ha) of grounds.

== History ==
The Elcot Park estate was purchased by Anthony Bushby Bacon (1772 - 1827), the son of a wealthy Welsh industrialist, from Charles Dundas, 1st Baron Amesbury, a prominent landowner from nearby Barton Court. He built the house in 1817. The gardens of Elcot Park were laid out in an English landscape style, with the area around the mansion laid to lawns with clumps of trees, woodland walks and distant views over the Kennet valley. There also was a walled kitchen garden with a range of glasshouses, including four greenhouses for vines and peaches, and also a pine pit heated with hot water. Elcot Park was well known in the nineteenth century for Bacon's implementation of hot water heating in the glasshouses.

When Anthony Bacon died in 1827, he was heavily in debt with two mortgages against the house. His son, Charles Bacon, bought the house in 1831 after clearing the debts, but seemed to continue to have financial difficulties as he had to sell the property in 1844. The sale documents from that time still exist and show Elcot Park was sold with 122 acres (49 ha) in contrast with today's 16 acres (6.5 ha).

=== The Shelleys ===
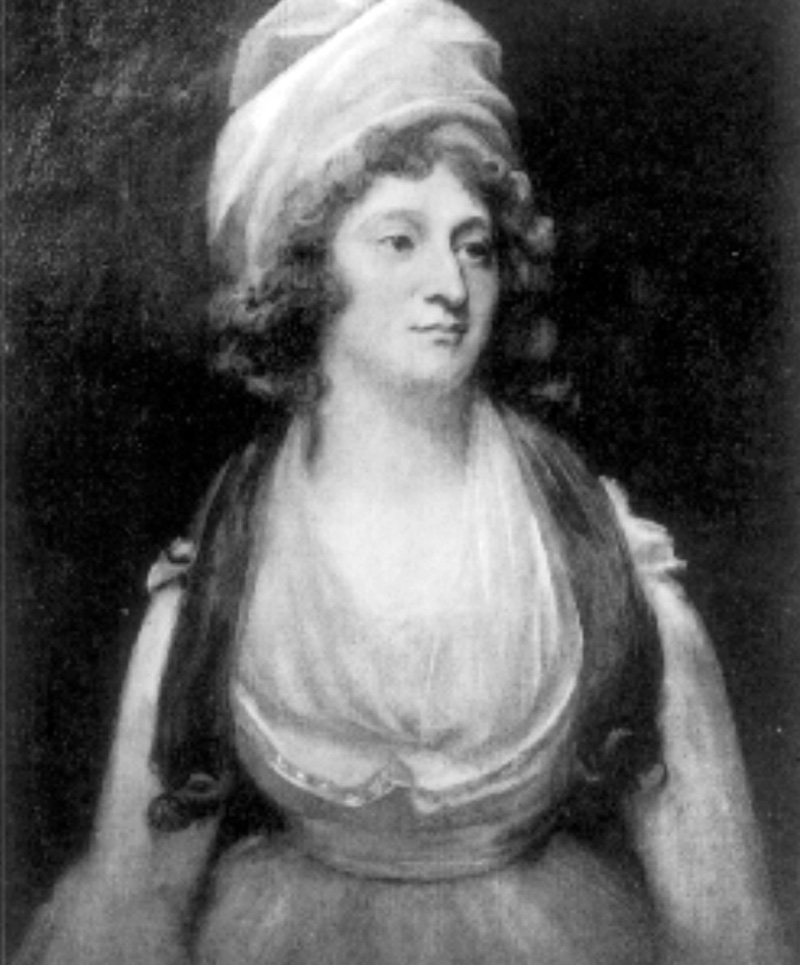
Lady Elizabeth Shelley circa 1790.

In 1844 Lady Elizabeth Shelley, the mother of Percy Bysshe Shelley, purchased Elcot and moved there from Field Place with her two unmarried daughters, Hellen and Margaret, following the death of her husband, Timothy Shelley.

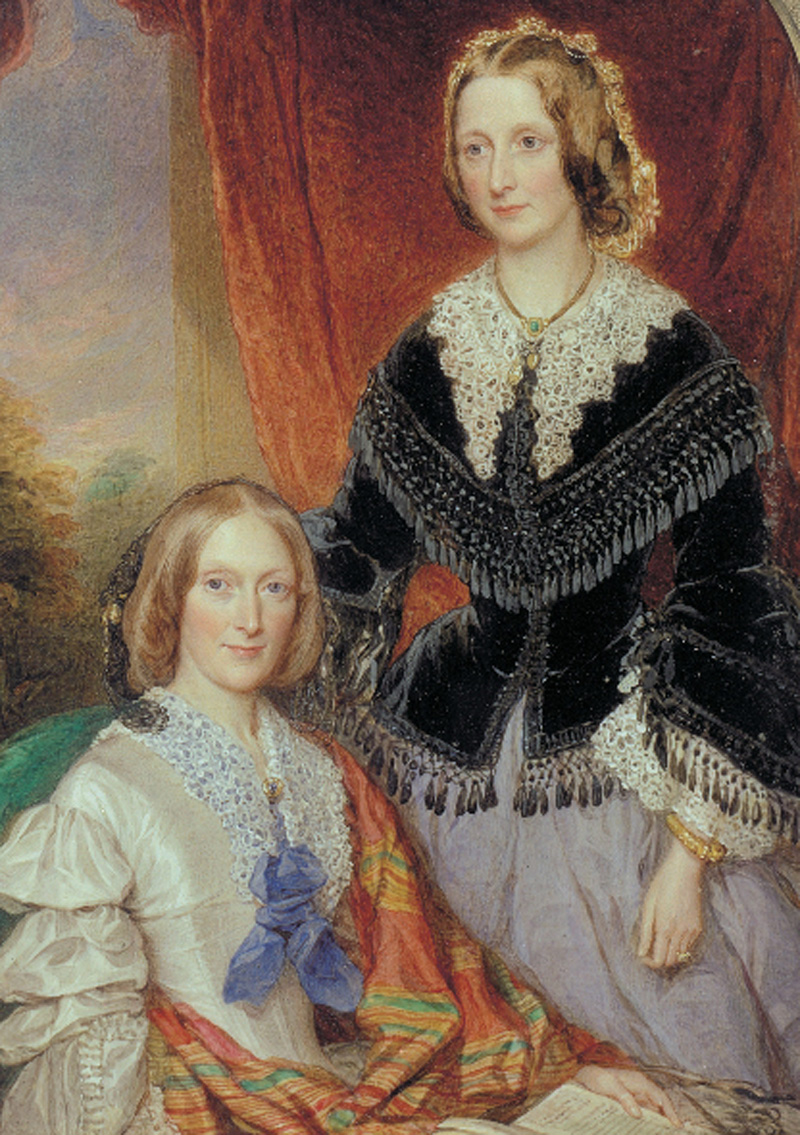
Hellen and Margaret Shelley

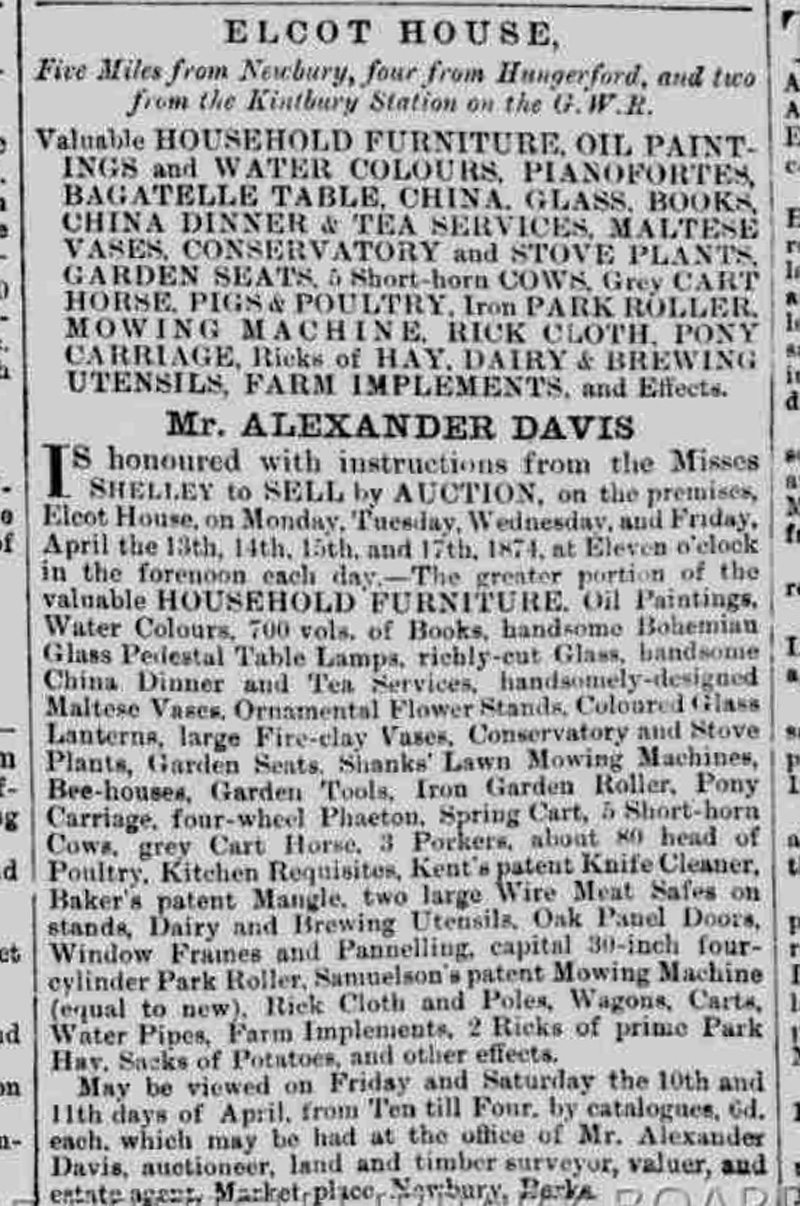
Advertisement for the sale of the Shelley sisters furniture in 1874.

Soon after she moved there Mary Wollstonecraft Shelley visited them to discuss her son’s inheritance. Elizabeth died in 1846 and Mary continued to visit Hellen and Margaret at Elcot. A letter from Mary written at Elcot House in 1847 still exists.

Hellen was fond of her brother Percy and in 1857, while she resided at Elcot, she wrote a series of letters about her memories of their childhood together. These letters became the key sources in the many biographies that have been published about the poet.

The estate was then let for a number of years to various military families until the Shelley family sold their interest in Elcot Park to Sir Richard Vincent Sutton, 6th Baronet in 1899. Sir Richard’s main seat was Benham Park, and the land attached to Elcot at that time adjoined Benham Valence. Elcot Park was again let for a further 25 years to a prominent JP by the name of Richard Plaskett Thomas. He ran J Thomas & Co, Tea Brokers based in Calcutta, India. The land belonging to Elcot Park then became part of the tenancy for Elcot Farmhouse. The main mansion, parkland and outbuildings forming a separate tenancy.
