= Anthony Bushby Bacon =

British industrialist (1772-1827)

Anthony Bushby Bacon (also known as Anthony Bushby or Anthony Smith or, occasionally, Anthony Bacon II; and, as a child, William Addison) (1772 - 11 August 1827) was a British industrialist turned landed gentleman.

Anthony was the eldest of the five illegitimate children of Anthony Bacon, the prominent Welsh ironmaster, by Mary Bushby of Gloucestershire. All were still minors when their father died. In his father's will, Anthony Junior was left his main estate at Cyfarthfa in Glamorgan, including the ironworks, and also half of the nearby Hirwaun works. His three younger brothers and single sister also received shares in their father's property. However, upon coming of age, Anthony seems to have had little desire to continue his father's business and he leased the Cyfarthfa ironworks to Richard Crawshay. In 1806, he sold his share of the Hirwaun works to his brother, Thomas, and, with the proceeds, he bought the Mathews' estate at Aberaman, also in Glamorgan, where he lived when in Wales. However, he later also held lands in Berkshire. About 1811, he rented Benham Park in Speen. He later purchased Elcot Park in Kintbury. When he died in 1827, he was buried in the family vault at Shaw-cum-Donnington near his brother's home at Donnington Castle House. Anthony's Aberaman estate later came into the possession of Crawshay Bailey. He married Elizabeth, the daughter and sole heiress of Richard Ramsbottom MP of Woodside House at Old Windsor in Berkshire, and they had eleven children.
