= Italian destroyer Augusto Riboty =

Scout cruiser and destroyer of the Regia Marina

History

Kingdom of Italy
- Name: Augusto Riboty
- Namesake: Augusto Riboty (1816–1888), Italian admiral and politician
- Builder: Gio. Ansaldo & C., Sestri Ponente, Italy
- Laid down: 27 February 1915
- Launched: 24 September 1916
- Completed: 5 May 1917
- Commissioned: 5 May 1917
- Reclassified: From scout cruiser to destroyer 1938
- Fate: To Italian Republic 1946

Italian Republic
- Decommissioned: February 1950
- Stricken: 1 May 1950
- Honors and awards: Bronze Medal of Military Valor
- Fate: Scrapped 1951

General characteristics (as built)
- Class & type: Mirabello-class destroyer
- Displacement: 1,784 t (1,756 long tons) (normal); 2,040 t (2,010 long tons) (deep load)
- Length: 103.75 m (340 ft 5 in)
- Beam: 9.74 m (31 ft 11 in)
- Draught: 3.3 m (10 ft 10 in)
- Installed power: 4 Yarrow boilers; 44,000 hp (33,000 kW)
- Propulsion: 2 shafts; 2 geared steam turbines
- Speed: 35 knots (65 km/h; 40 mph)
- Range: 2,300 nmi (4,300 km) at 12 knots (22 km/h; 14 mph)
- Complement: 8 officers and 161 enlisted men
- Armament: 1 × single 152 mm (6 in) gun; 7 × single 102 mm (4 in) guns; 2 × single 76 mm (3 in) AA guns; 2 × twin 450 mm (17.7 in) torpedo tubes; 120 mines

Augusto Riboty was one of three Mirabello-class scout cruisers built for the Italian Regia Marina (Royal Navy) during World War I. She was in commission from 1917 to 1950, taking part in the Adriatic Campaign of World War I, and during the interwar period she was at Split during postwar unrest there. Reclassified as a destroyer in 1938, she was the most active Italian destroyer of World War II, during which she participated in the Battle of the Mediterranean on the Axis side in the service of Fascist Italy from 1940 to 1943, then on the Allied side from 1943 to 1945 as a unit of the Italian Co-Belligerent Navy. She was scrapped in 1951.

== Design and description ==
The ships were designed as scout cruisers (esploratori), essentially enlarged versions of contemporary destroyers. They had an overall length of 103.75 meters (340 ft 5 in), a beam of 9.74 meters (31 ft 11 in) and a mean draft of 3.3 meters (10 ft 10 in). They displaced 1,784 tonnes (1,756 long tons) at standard load, and 2,040 tonnes (2,010 long tons) at deep load. Their complement was eight officers and 161 enlisted men.

The Mirabellos were powered by two Parsons geared steam turbines, each driving one propeller shaft using steam supplied by four Yarrow boilers. The turbines were rated at 44,000 shaft horsepower (33,000 kW) for a speed of 35 knots (65 km/h; 40 mph) and Augusto Riboty reached a speed of 35.03 knots (64.88 km/h; 40.31 mph) from 38,962 shp (29,054 kW) during her sea trials. The ships carried enough fuel oil to give them a range of 2,300 nautical miles (4,300 km; 2,600 mi) at a speed of 12 knots (22 km/h; 14 mph).

Augusto Riboty's main battery consisted of a single Cannone da 152 mm (6 in)/40 A Modello 1891 gun forward of the superstructure. The gun was backed up by seven Cannone da 102 mm (4 in)/35 S Modello 1914 guns in single mounts protected by gun shields, one aft the superstructure and the remaining guns positioned on the broadside amidships. Anti-aircraft (AA) defense for the Mirabello-class ships was provided by a pair of Cannone da 76 mm (3 in)/40 Modello 1916 AA guns in single mounts. They were equipped with four 450-millimeter (17.7 in) torpedo tubes in two twin mounts, one on each broadside. Augusto Riboty could carry 120 mines, although her sisters could only handle 100.

=== Modifications ===
The gun proved to be too heavy for the ships and its rate of fire was too slow so it was replaced when the ships were rearmed with eight Cannone da 102/45 S, A Modello 1917 guns arranged with single guns fore and aft of the superstructure and the other on the broadside. The 76 mm guns were replaced by a pair of Cannone da 40 mm (1.6 in)/39 AA guns in single mounts in 1920–1922.

== Construction and commissioning ==
Augusto Riboty was laid down by Gio. Ansaldo & C. at Sestri Ponente, Kingdom of Italy, on 27 February 1915. She was launched on 24 September 1916 and completed and commissioned as a scout cruiser on 5 May 1917.

== Service history ==
=== World War I ===
Stationed at Brindisi, Italy, Augusto Riboty operated in the Adriatic Sea during World War I, taking part in the Adriatic campaign. On 16 July 1917, she put to sea together with her sister ship Carlo Alberto Racchia to provide distant support for a bombing raid on Durrës (known to the Italians as Durazzo) on the coast of the Principality of Albania by 18 aircraft departing from Brindisi and Vlorë (known to the Italians as Valona) in Albania.

On 10 March 1918, the destroyer Antonio Mosto, with the motor torpedo boat MAS 100 in tow, and the destroyer Ippolito Nievo, towing MAS 99, set out for a raid on Portorož (known to the Italians as Portorose) on the coast of Austria-Hungary, supported by Augusto Riboty — serving as flagship for the commander of the operation, Contrammiraglio (Counter Admiral) Guido Biscaretti di Ruffia — her sister ship Carlo Mirabello, the scout cruisers Alessandro Poerio and Cesare Rossarol, the destroyers Giacinto Carini and Pilade Bronzetti, and a French Navy destroyer squadron led by the destroyer Casque. Antonio Mosto, Ippolito Nievo, MAS 99, and MAS 100 reached the vicinity of Portorož, but then had to postpone the operation due to bad weather. The ships attempted the raid again on 16 March, but adverse weather again forced its postponement. They made a third attempt on 8 April 1918, but after aerial reconnaissance ascertained that the port of Portorož was empty, the Italians again called off the operation.

At 18:10 on 12 May 1918, Pilade Bronzetti, with MAS 99 in tow, and Ippolito Nievo, towing MAS 100, got underway with Augusto Riboty and Carlo Mirabello from Brindisi for a raid against the roadstead at Durrës. At 23:00, MAS 99 and MAS 100 dropped their tow cables about 10 nautical miles (19 km; 12 mi) from Durrës, then entered the harbor. At 02:30 on 13 May MAS 99 torpedoed the steamer Bregenz, which sank a few minutes later with the loss of 234 men. The attack triggered a violent Austro-Hungarian reaction, but all the Italian ships returned unscathed to Brindisi.

By late October 1918, Austria-Hungary had effectively disintegrated, and the Armistice of Villa Giusti, signed on 3 November 1918, went into effect on 4 November 1918 and brought hostilities between Austria-Hungary and the Allies to an end. After getting underway from Brindisi on 4 November, Augusto Riboty arrived at the island of Lastovo (known to the Italians as Lagosta) at 14:00 that day and took possession of it for the Kingdom of Italy. The war ended a week later with the armistice between the Allies and the German Empire on 11 November 1918. During the war, Augusto Riboty took part in 52 operations.

=== Interwar period ===
On 27 December 1918 Augusto Riboty was stationed at Split (known to the Italians as Spalato) on the coast of Dalmatia, where violence had broken out between Italians and Slavs. During her time in Split, she had orders from the Italian military governor of Dalmatia, Ammiraglio (Admiral) Enrico Millo, to provide free food and assistance to the city's population — and especially to assist and protect its Italian residents — and to document the atmosphere of ethnic hatred and violence between Italians and Slavs in central Dalmatia. Her arrival greatly irritated officials of the new Kingdom of Serbs, Croats, and Slovenes (later renamed the Kingdom of Yugoslavia), and a protest demonstration against her presence greeted her as she moored at the pier. The situation remained very tense throughout her time at Split as Italian troops slowly took possession of territory in Dalmatia promised to the Kingdom of Italy by the Treaty of London of 1915, the border of which was close to Split, although Split itself had not been promised to Italy. As the Italian consul Marcello Roddolo, serving aboard Augusto Riboty, observed, "Our troops, who are gradually occupying the borders of the [territory promised to Italy after the] armistice, and therefore are approaching Split, make the Yugoslavs believe that our occupation of that land [i.e., Split itself] is imminent, an occupation which the Serbian units would almost certainly oppose with weapons." After the protected cruiser Puglia arrived to relieve her on station, Augusto Riboty departed Split on 12 January 1919, thus missing the worst of the violence there, which lasted until 1920.

In the 1920s, Augusto Riboty underwent modifications to her armament which saw the replacement of her 152/40 mm gun with a 102/35 Mod. 1914 and the embarkation of two Vickers-Armstrong QF 2-pounder 40 mm automatic cannons, new hydrophones, and equipment for depth charges. From 17 May to 2 November 1923 her commanding officer was Capitano di navio (Ship-of-the-Line Captain) Giuseppe Cantù, a future ammiraglio di squadra (squadron admiral). Subsequently, from 4 November 1923 to 21 February 1925, she was under the command of Capitano di navio Umberto Bucci.

In 1938, Augusto Riboty was reclassified as a destroyer. Her growing obsolescence — her maximum speed had dropped to 27 knots (50 km/h; 31 mph), and she lacked a fire-control center — led the Regia Marina to make plans to decommission her by 1940.

=== World War II ===
==== Fascist Italy (1940–1943) ====
World War II broke out in September 1939 with Nazi Germany's invasion of Poland. Fascist Italy joined the war on the side of the Axis powers with its invasion of France on 10 June 1940. At the time, Augusto Riboty was based at Brindisi with Carlo Mirabello as part of the destroyer division there. The outbreak of war prompted the Regia Marina to keep Augusto Riboty in commission. Taking part in the Adriatic campaign and the broader Battle of the Mediterranean, she operated mainly on escort duty along the shipping routes in the southern Adriatic Sea and the Ionian Sea, escorting convoys between Italy, the Italian protectorate of Albania, and the Kingdom of Greece, although she also operated in the Strait of Sicily in the central Mediterranean Sea.

While at Brindisi in blackout conditions on 27 September 1940, Augusto Riboty collided with the destroyer Nicolò Zeno.

On 5 October 1940, Augusto Riboty left Durrës to escort the steamers SS Carnia and SS Olimpia. During the voyage, the British submarine HMS Triton torpedoed Olimpia in the Adriatic Sea in position 41°06′N 018°39′E, damaging her.

Later in October 1940, Augusto Riboty and Carlo Mirabello were assigned temporarily to the Forza Navale Speciale (Special Naval Force). Tasked with occupying Corfu, the force, commanded by Ammiraglio di squadra (Squadron Admiral) Vittorio Tur, also included the light cruiser Bari (Tur's flagship), the light cruiser Taranto, the torpedo boats Altair, Andromeda, Angelo Bassini, Antares, Aretusa, Giacomo Medici, and Nicola Fabrizi, and the tankers Garigliano, Sesia, and Tirso. Plans called for merchant ships to land the Royal Army's 47th Infantry Division "Bari" and a battalion of the Regia Marina′s Regiment "San Marco" on Corfu on 28 October 1940 — the day the Greco–Italian War broke out with Italy's invasion of Greece — but the amphibious landing was postponed due to rough seas, first to 30 October, then to 31 October, and then again to 2 November before it was cancelled because of the disappointing performance of Italian forces on the Greek front. The 47th Infantry Division "Bari" was reassigned to operations on the front in Epirus, and the merchant ships proceeded to Vlorë (known to the Italians as Valona) in Albania to disembark the division there.

On 18 December 1940, as the Greco-Italian War continued, Augusto Riboty, the light cruisers Eugenio di Savoia and Raimondo Montecuccoli, and the destroyers Antonio Pigafetta, Emanuele Pessagno, and Nicoloso da Recco bombarded Greek positions near Corfu. On 1 March 1941 she and Andromeda again bombarded Greek coastal positions.

During convoy escort operations, Augusto Riboty clashed with enemy submarines on three occasions in 1941 — on 18 July in the Adriatic Sea, on 5 August in the Ionian Sea near Zakynthos, Greece, and on 25 October off Patras, Greece.

Augusto Riboty underwent a modernization in 1942 which involved the removal of two 102-millimetre (4 in) guns and the installation of a 40-millimetre automatic cannons. In 1943 she was modified again: The 102-millimetre (4 in) guns were reduced to four, the three 40-millimetre automatic cannons were replaced by six 20-millimetre ones, and her depth-charge capacity was increased.

On 5 February 1943, Augusto Riboty was escorting the tanker Utilitas, loaded with fuel, from Taranto to Palermo, Sicily, when the British submarine HMS Turbulent torpedoed Utilitas at around 07:00. Utilitas sank off Capo Zafferano, east of Palermo.

At 11:20 on 15 February 1943, Augusto Riboty got underway from Palermo under the command of Tenente di vascello (Ship-of-the-Line Lieutenant) Nicola Ferrone with the torpedo boats Monsone and Sirio and the corvettes Antilope and Gabbiano to escort the steamers SS Alcamo, SS Chieti to Bizerta, and SS Frosinone, but eight hours later she had to reverse course and head for Trapani, Sicily, due to engine failure. The rest of the convoy reached its destination unscathed despite an attack by Allied motor torpedo boats.

On 3 April 1943, Augusto Riboty was on escort duty in the Gulf of Taranto when an Allied submarine attacked with torpedoes. She avoided one torpedo that passed near her, but the tanker Regina was hit and damaged.

==== Co-Belligerent Navy (1943–1945) ====
On 8 September 1943, the Kingdom of Italy announced an armistice with the Allies and switched sides in the war, prompting Nazi Germany to begin Operation Achse, the disarmament by force of the Italian armed forces and the occupation of those portions of Italy not yet under Allied control. On the morning of 12 September 1943, Augusto Riboty and the submarines Atropo, Jalea, and Fratelli Bandiera got underway from Taranto and headed for Malta. Augusto Riboty reached Malta on 13 September, moored at St. Paul's Bay that afternoon, and handed herself over to the Allies in accordance with the armistice agreement. She then moved to Marsa Scirocco, Malta, and moored there. On 6 October 1943 she left Malta with the torpedo boats Ariete and Orione, six submarines, and two smaller vessels to return to Italy.

Augusto Riboty subsequently fought on the Allied side as a unit of the Italian Co-belligerent Navy through the end of World War II in Europe in May 1945. She escorted U.S. convoys and took part in the transportation of men and materials to the battleships Italia and Vittorio Veneto, which were interned in the Great Bitter Lake in the Suez Canal in Egypt.

Credited with participation in 365 operations and having steamed 70,350 nautical miles (130,288 km; 80,957 mi), Augusto Riboty was the most active Italian destroyer of World War II. To honor her service in both World War I and World War II, the ship was awarded the Bronze Medal of Military Valor.

=== Post-World War II ===
The Italian Republic replaced the Kingdom of Italy in 1946, and the name of the country's navy changed from Regia Marina (Royal Navy) to Marina Militare (literally "Military Navy"). Under the terms of the Paris Peace Treaties signed on 10 February 1947, Augusto Riboty was to be transferred to the Soviet Union, but the Soviet Navy rejected her because of her age and worn-out condition. Instead, the Marina Militare used her as a pontoon at Taranto. She was decommissioned in February 1950, stricken from the naval register on 1 May 1950, and scrapped in 1951.

== Honors and awards ==
Bronze Medal of Military Valor

== Bibliography ==
- Brescia, Maurizio (2012). Mussolini's Navy: A Reference Guide to the Regina Marina 1930–45. Annapolis, Maryland: Naval Institute Press. ISBN 978-1-59114-544-8.
- Dodson, Aidan & Cant, Serena (2020). Spoils of War: The Fate of Enemy Fleets after Two World Wars. Barnsley, UK: Seaforth Publishing. ISBN 978-1-5267-4198-1.
- Favre, Franco. La Marina nella Grande Guerra. Le operazioni navali, aeree, subacquee e terrestri in Adriatico (in Italian).
- Fraccaroli, Aldo (1970). Italian Warships of World War I. London: Ian Allan. ISBN 0-7110-0105-7.
- Fraccaroli, Aldo (1968). Italian Warships of World War II. Shepperton, UK: Ian Allan. ISBN 0-7110-0002-6.
- Gray, Randal, ed. (1985). Conway's All the World's Fighting Ships 1906–1921. Annapolis, Maryland: Naval Institute Press. ISBN 978-0-87021-907-8.
- Roberts, John (1980). "Italy". In Chesneau, Roger (ed.). Conway's All the World's Fighting Ships 1922–1946. New York: Mayflower Books. pp. 280–317. ISBN 0-8317-0303-2.
- Rohwer, Jürgen (2005). Chronology of the War at Sea 1939–1945: The Naval History of World War Two (Third Revised ed.). Annapolis, Maryland: Naval Institute Press. ISBN 1-59114-119-2.
- Whitley, M. J. (1988). Destroyers of World War 2: An International Encyclopedia. Annapolis, Maryland: Naval Institute Press. ISBN 1-85409-521-8.
