= Biscaretti di Ruffia =

Biscaretti di Ruffia is an Italian surname. Notable people with the surname include:

- Carlo Biscaretti di Ruffia (1879 –1959), Italian artist, industrial designer and journalist
- Guido Biscaretti di Ruffia (1867 –1946), Italian admiral and politician

== See also ==
- Ruffia
