= Carlo Alberto Racchia =

Italian admiral and politician

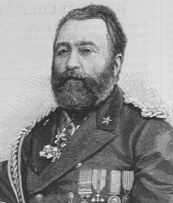

Minister of the Navy
- In office 8 December 1892 – 28 November 1893
- Preceded by: Benedetto Brin
- Succeeded by: Enrico Morin

Senator
- In office 29 November 1892 – 12 March 1896

Member of the Chamber of Deputies
- In office 28 December 1884 – 26 August 1887
- In office 10 December 1890 – 5 March 1891

Carlo Alberto Racchia (Turin, 31 August 1833 – La Spezia, 12 March 1896) was an Italian admiral and politician. He served as was Minister of the Navy of the Kingdom of Italy in the first Giolitti government.

== Early life and career ==
Carlo Alberto was the son of Paolo Racchia and Anna Berune. At his baptism he was held by king Charles Albert of Sardinia and was given his name. His mother was of Scottish descent and he was partly educated in England, but he graduated from the Royal Naval School in Genoa in 1852 with the rank of ensign.

From 1852 to 1868 he served aboard the brig Aurora, the corvette Aquila and the frigates Beroldo and Maria Adelaide. He was promoted to second lieutenant in 1855, lieutenant first class in 1861, and frigate captain first class in 1868. He took part in the First Italian War of Independence, the Crimean War, the Second Italian War of Independence and the unification with the Kingdom of the Two Sicilies, earning the bronze medal in the military valor during the siege of Messina and the Military Order of Savoy during the siege of Gaeta.

== Voyage to the Far East ==
From 1868 to 1871, in command of the corvette Principessa Clotilde, Racchia completed a 40-month tour in the Far East.

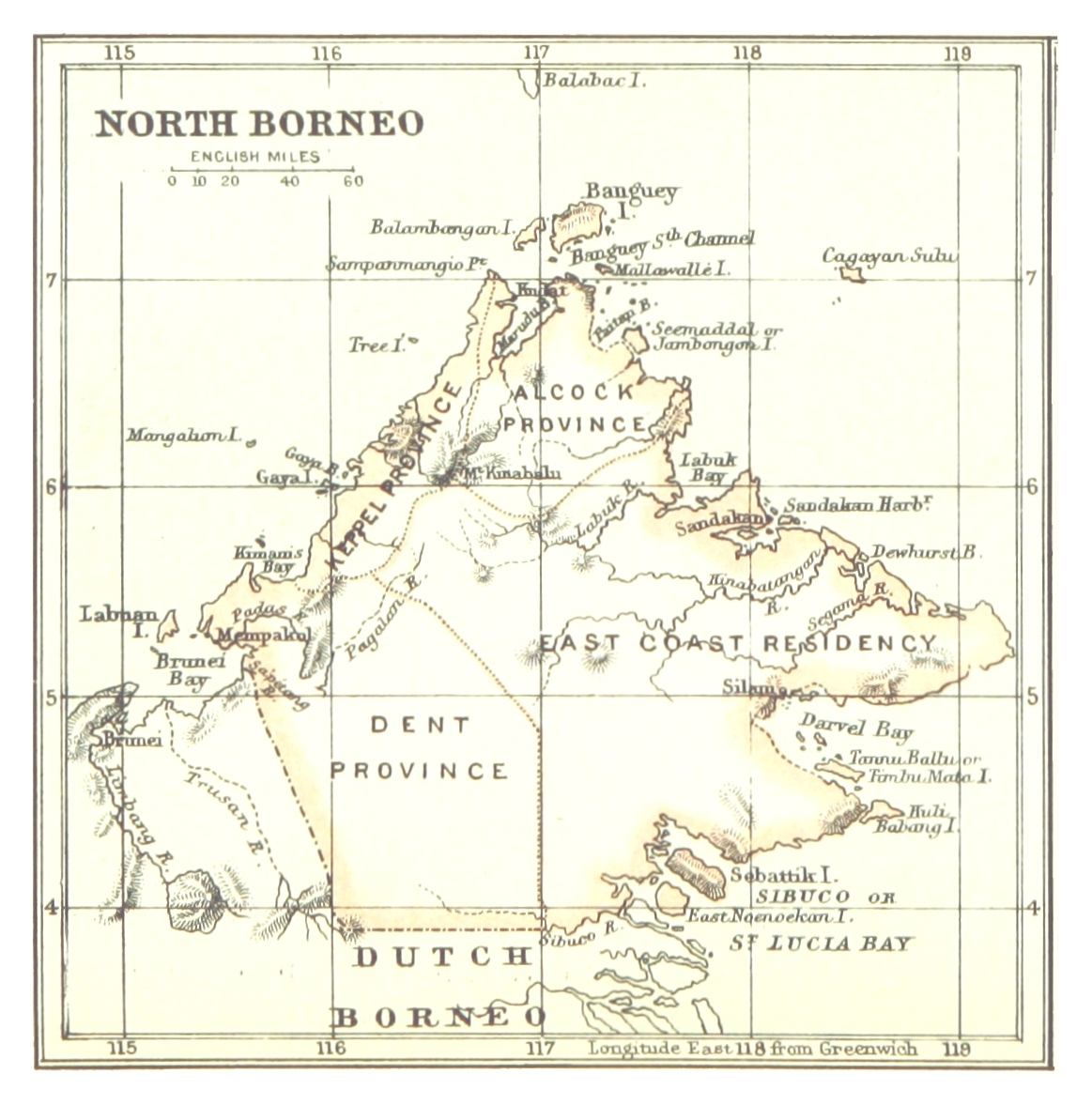
1888 Map of North Borneo showing Gaya Island off Keppel Province

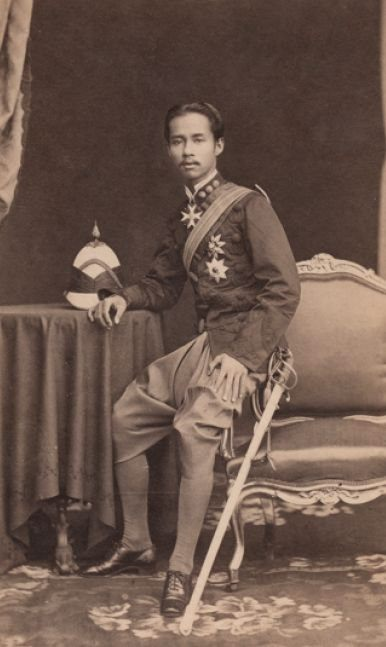
King Chulalongkorn of Thailand in 1870

The objective of the expedition, ostensibly scientific, was to identify a territory suitable for the creation of a new penal colony; the plan was for Italy to pay a local ruler to secure a territorial concession. Racchia's mission arrived in Borneo and identified Gaya Island, near the modern Kota Kinabalu, as a suitable location. The local ruler, Sultan Abdul Momin of Brunei was willing to come to an arrangement, but the British, whose presence in the region was long-standing, did not support the plan so it did not go ahead.

In January 1871 Racchia made an official visit to Johor, where he invested the Maharajah Abu Bakar with the rank of Knight Commander of the Order of the Crown of Italy on behalf of King Vittorio Emanuele II in a move to begin friendly commercial relations. In the same month he visited Bangkok where he was received by king Chulalongkorn and the 1868 treaty of commerce and navigation between the two countries was ratified. On reaching Myanmar, Racchia travelled inland to Mandalay to sign a commercial treaty with a plenipotentiary of king Mindon Min.

The Principessa Clotilde visited a number of other ports in Asia on the same voyage. It was the first Italian ship ever to visit Manila, in October 1868. It also visited Zamboanga in May 1870 and Japan in 1871.

Racchia first corresponded with the newly-founded Società Geografica Italiana in 1869, while he was still in the Far East. On his return to Italy he became involved in the Society’s work, and it published the journals he had kept during his trip. He was elected to the Council of the Society in 1885 and became its vice president in 1889, a post he held until his death.

== Later naval and diplomatic career ==
In 1876 he was promoted to Captain first class; in 1881 he obtained the rank of Rear Admiral, and in 1887 that of Vice Admiral. He served as President of the Maritime Military Tribunal of La Spezia from 1875 to 1876, commander of the Royal Navy School of Genoa from 1876 to 1880, and was subsequently naval attaché in London, President of the Commission for Experiments on War Materials, General Secretary of the Ministry of the Navy, Commander of the Squadron and the 1st maritime department.

== Political career ==
Racchia began his political career by winning a by-election to the Chamber of Deputies in the constituency of Grosseto in 1884. He was re-elected in 1886 but stood down in 1887 as his promotion to vice admiral made him ineligible to continue serving. He was returned to the Chamber by the electors of Grosseto in 1890, but the election was annulled a few months later. In 1892 he was appointed Minister of the Navy. and shortly afterwards he was appointed Senator of the Kingdom of Italy. However the Giolitti government was forced to resign less than a year later following the Banca Romana scandal.

== Death ==
In 1894 Racchia took command of an active squad, which the following year became a reserve squad. During this assignment he fell ill and died of pneumonia on board the ironclad battleship Lepanto off La Spezia. He was buried in the cemetery at Bene Vagienna. The scout cruiser Carlo Alberto Racchia, commissioned in 1916, was also named after him.

== Legacy ==
A battery in the defences of the Gulf of La Spezia bears Racchia′s name.

The Mirabello-class scout cruiser Carlo Alberto Racchia, commissioned in 1916 and reclassified as a destroyer in 1938, was named after Racchi. She took part in World War I and sank after striking a mine in 1920.

== Honours ==
Carlo Alberto Racchia was awarded a number of Italian and foreign honours.

Grand Cordon of the Order of Saints Maurice and Lazarus - ribbon for ordinary uniform

Grand Cordon of the Order of Saints Maurice and Lazarus
— 14 May 1872

Grand Cordon of the Order of the Crown of Italy - ribbon for ordinary uniform

Grand Cordon of the Order of the Crown of Italy
— 2 December 1888

Knight of the Military Order of Savoy - ribbon for ordinary uniform

Knight of the Military Order of Savoy
— 19 May 1861

Bronze medal of Military Valor - ribbon for ordinary uniform

Bronze medal of Military Valor

Officer of the Order of Nichan Iftikar (Tunisia) - ribbon for ordinary uniform

Officer of the Order of Nichan Iftikar (Tunisia)
— 9 December 1862

Knight of the Military Order of Aviz (Portugal) - ribbon for ordinary uniform

Knight of the Military Order of Aviz (Portugal)
— 4 January 1863

Knight of the Order of the Tower and Sword (Portugal) - ribbon for ordinary uniform

Knight of the Order of the Tower and Sword (Portugal)
— 30 November 1862
