= Piombino–Livorno race =

Motor racing event in Italy

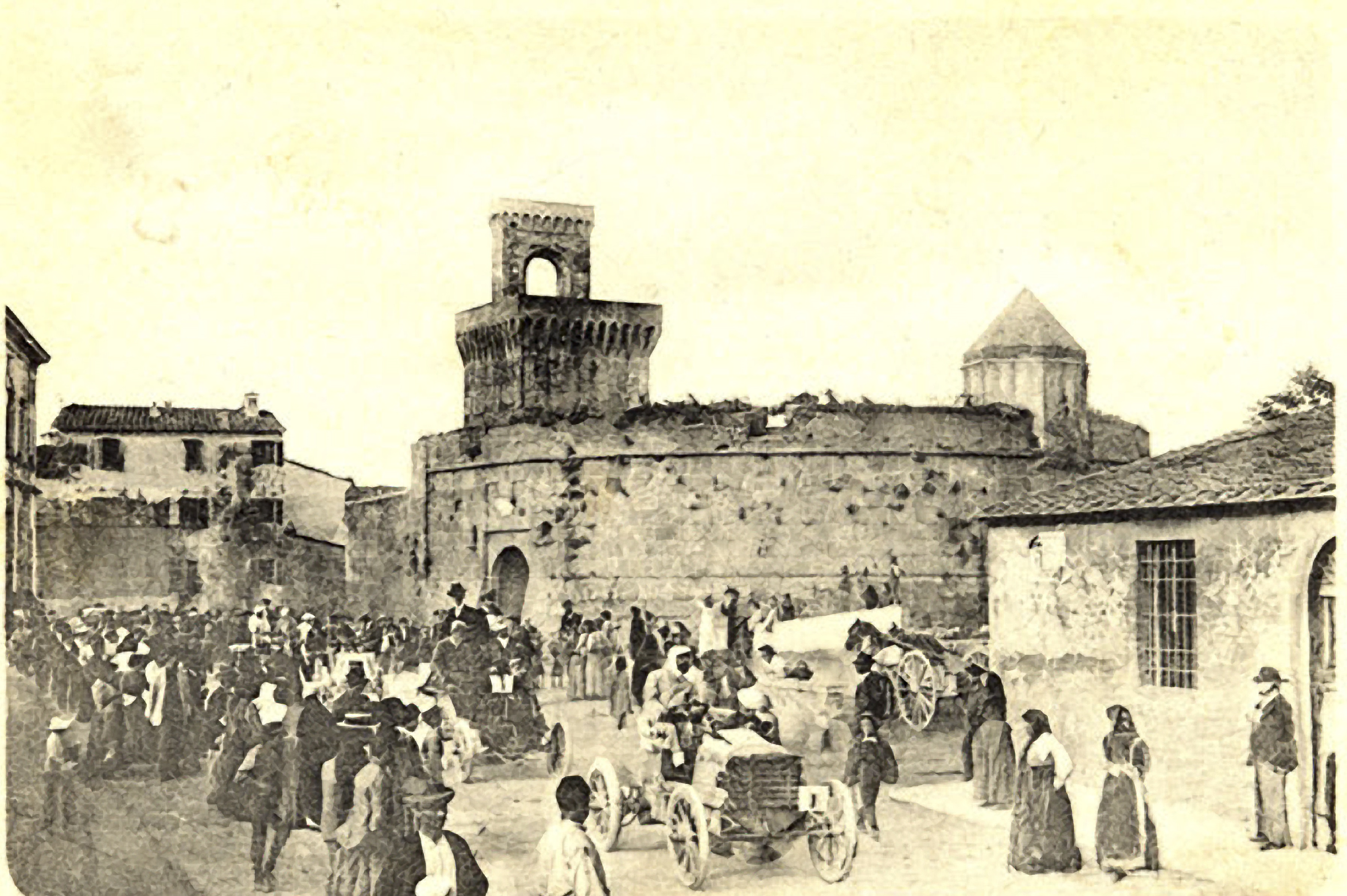
Piombino, 24 August 1901, start from Porta a Terra

Piombino–Livorno was the first motor racing held in Tuscany, on August 24, 1901.

== History ==
This race involved the Committee of the Livornese Summer Party, the Municipality of Piombino, the Municipality of Livorno, the family Della Gherardesca, the family Ginori and the Touring Italian Club. This competition was supported by the Michelin pneumatic firm, which offered monetary prizes to winners; moreover, the King Vittorio Emanuele III from Savoia supported it as well by giving medals to the best racers. Originally, the race was supposed to take place between Grosseto and Livorno, an approximate distance of 150 km. But the road was impassable due to abundant precipitation, resulting in the track being reduced to 82 km by beginning the race at Piombino. The race was part of a great event, which lasted three days. On Saturday, August 24, 1901, the contestants raced from Piombino to Livorno on the ancient Via Aurelia for the "Gran Premio di Sua Maestà il Re." On Sunday, August 25, the plan predicted a parade to the Cisternone from Antignano to Livorno; whereas, on Monday August 26 competitors had conducted the short-distance race of 500 Meters from Antignano to San Jacopo, and a competition of ability at the circle of Ardenza.

== The race ==
The vehicles registered for the competition were divided into various categories: The first category included large vehicles weighing over 1000 kg, the second category included light vehicles weighing less than 1000 kg, the third category consisted of small vehicles weighing no more than 450 kg, the fourth category included tricycles, and the fifth category was reserved for motorcycles. The contestants raced in turn according to the following order: large vehicles, tricycles, light vehicles, small vehicles, and motorcycles. The starting times had all been anticipated several hours beforehand at 7:30 due to poor road conditions. Not a single motorcycle arrived at the finish line: Renzo Mazzoleni, who drove Ceirano 2 ¼ HP, had given up in Vada; whereas, Emanuele Rosselli, who used a Rosselli 2¼ HP, had given up as well shortly after the start because the road was impassable. The Piombino – Livorno tournament had been the first event won by Fiat, as a result of the victory by novice racer Felice Nazzaro. His first victory was obtained while driving the Fiat 12 HP property race of Conte Camillo Della Gherardesca, making a record at 1:49:54 with an average of 44,77 km/h. Despite the poor weather, the competition was a great achievement. Even though the tram remained in service along the route, no accidents occurred during the race.

== Anecdotes ==
The Cotta–Morandini duo signed up for the race with a Darracq while traveling from Torino to Livorno. The two had been arrested by RR. Carabinieri in La Spezia due to a telegram which ordered the arrest of the first driver, who was believed to be responsible for an accident. However, they were released just 10 hours later when another telegram made clear the true nature of the accident, but by that time they were already too late to proceed with the race. Even the Count Carlo Biscaretti di Ruffia, a contestant who had started from Torino with a Phenix 3 ½ HP had trouble with the motor; consequently, they proceeded to Livorno by train where they could watch the competition as spectators.

== Classification Piombino Livorno, Gran Premio di Sua Maestà il Re ==
	Pilot	Brand	Category	Power	Weight	Owner
1	Felice Nazzaro	Fiat 12HP corsa	Vehicles over 1.000 kg	12 hp	1.100 kg	Conte Camillo Della Gherardesca
2	Ugobaldo Tonietti	Panhard Levassor	Vehicles over 1.000 kg	32 hp	1.200 kg	Cavalier Ugobaldo Tonietti
3	Gaston Osmond	De Dion Bouton	Tricycles	6 hp	150 kg	Gaston Osmond
4	Galileo Serafini	Panhard Levassor	Vehicles less than 1.000 kg	12 hp	650 kg	Principe Pietro Strozzi
5	Guido Trieste	Florentia	Vehicles less than 1.000 kg	8 hp	480 kg	Guido Trieste
6	Ettore Nagliati	De Dion	Vehicles less than 1.000 kg	5 hp	480 kg	Ettore Nagliati
7	Nourry	De Dion	Tricycles	6 hp	150 kg	Nourry
8	Ernesto Wehreim	Darracq	Vehicles less than 1.000 kg	12 hp	480 kg	Ernesto Wehreim
Rit.	Emanuele Rosselli	Rosselli	Motorcycles	2¼ hp	32 kg	Emanuele Rosselli
Rit.	Renzo Mazzoleni	Ceirano	Motorcycles	2¼ hp	32 kg	Renzo Mazzoleni
Rit.	?	Panhard Levassor	Vehicles over 1.000 kg	12 hp	1.100 kg	Commendator Figner

== Notes ==
Il Telegrafo August 15 and 25, 1901. La Gazzetta Livornese August 24, 25 and 26, 1901. Story of Count Carlo Biscaretti of Ruffia. First Fiat victory. Felice Nazzaro first win.
