= Italian destroyer Carlo Mirabello =

Destroyer of the Regia Marina

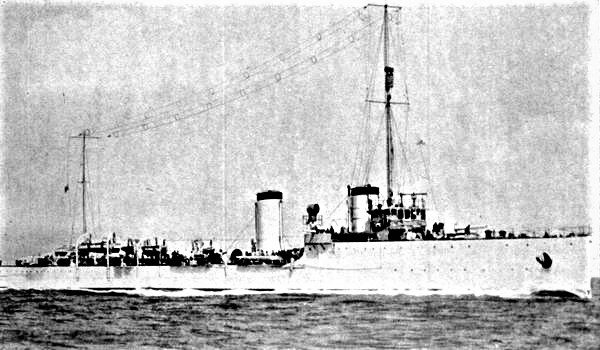
- Carlo Mirabello at sea

History

Kingdom of Italy
- Name: Carlo Mirabello
- Namesake: Carlo Mirabello (1847–1910), Italian admiral and politician
- Builder: Gio. Ansaldo & C., Sestri Ponente, Italy
- Laid down: 21 November 1914
- Launched: 21 December 1915
- Completed: 24 August 1916
- Reclassified: from scout cruiser to destroyer 1938
- Fate: Sunk by mine 21 May 1941

General characteristics (as built)
- Class & type: Mirabello-class destroyer
- Displacement: 1,784 t (1,756 long tons) (normal); 2,040 t (2,010 long tons) (deep load)
- Length: 103.75 m (340 ft 5 in)
- Beam: 9.74 m (31 ft 11 in)
- Draught: 3.6 m (11 ft 10 in) (deep load)
- Installed power: 4 Yarrow boilers; 44,000 hp (33,000 kW)
- Propulsion: 2 shafts; 2 geared steam turbines
- Speed: 35 knots (65 km/h; 40 mph)
- Range: 2,300 nmi (4,300 km) at 12 knots (22 km/h; 14 mph)
- Complement: 8 officers and 161 enlisted men
- Armament: 8 × single 102 mm (4 in) guns; 2 × single 76 mm (3 in) AA guns; 2 × twin 450 mm (17.7 in) torpedo tubes; 100 mines

Carlo Mirabello was one of three Mirabello-class scout cruisers built for the Italian Regia Marina (Royal Navy) during World War I. She took part in the Adriatic campaign of World War I, seeing action in the largest surface action of that campaign, the Battle of the Strait of Otranto, in May 1917. During the interwar period, she made a cruise to 19 countries and took part in the Italian intervention in the Spanish Civil War, and she was reclassified as a destroyer in 1938. During World War II, she fought in the Battle of the Mediterranean, taking part in the Adriatic campaign and operating in the Adriatic Sea and Ionian Sea until she struck a mine and sank in 1941.

== Design and description ==
The ships were constructed as scout cruisers (esploratori), essentially enlarged versions of contemporary destroyers. They had an overall length of 103.75 meters (340 ft 5 in), a beam of 9.74 meters (31 ft 11 in), and a mean draft of 3.3 meters (10 ft 10 in). They displaced 1,784 tonnes (1,756 long tons) at standard load, and 2,040 tonnes (2,010 long tons) at deep load. Their complement was eight officers and 161 enlisted men.

The Mirabellos were powered by two Parsons geared steam turbines, each driving one propeller shaft using steam supplied by four Yarrow boilers. The turbines were rated at 44,000 shaft horsepower (32,811 kW) for a speed of 35 knots (65 km/h; 40 mph) and Carlo Mirabello reached a speed of 33.74 knots (62.49 km/h; 38.83 mph) from 44,026 shp (32,830 kW) during her sea trials. The ships carried enough fuel oil to give them a range of 2,300 nautical miles (4,300 km; 2,600 mi) at a speed of 12 knots (22 km/h; 14 mph).

Their main battery consisted of eight Cannone da 102 mm (4 in)/35 S Modello 1914 guns in single mounts protected by gun shields, one each fore and aft of the superstructure on the centerline and the remaining guns positioned on the broadside amidships. Carlo Mirabello exchanged a Cannone da 152 mm (6 in)/40 A Modello 1891 for the forward 102 mm gun; Carlo Mirabello received hers in 1917. The gun proved to be too heavy for the ships and its rate of fire was too slow. Anti-aircraft (AA) defense for the Mirabello-class ships was provided by a pair of 40-caliber Cannone da 76 mm (3 in)/40 Modello 1916 AA guns in single mounts. They were equipped with four 450-millimeter (17.7 in) torpedo tubes in two twin mounts, one on each broadside. The ship could also carry 100 mines.

=== Modifications ===
The 152 mm gun proved to be too heavy for the ships and its rate of fire was too slow so it was replaced when the Mirabello-class ships were rearmed with eight 45-caliber Cannone da 102/45 S, A Modello 1917 guns arranged as per Carlo Mirabello's original configuration in 1919. The 76 mm guns were replaced by a pair of 39-caliber Cannone da 40 mm (1.6 in)/39 AA guns in single mounts in 1920–1922.

== Construction and commissioning ==
Carlo Mirabello was laid down by Gio. Ansaldo & C. at Sestri Ponente, Kingdom of Italy, on 21 November 1914. She was launched on 21 December 1915 and completed and commissioned as a scout cruiser on 24 August 1916.

== Service history ==
=== World War I ===
Carlo Mirabello operated in the Adriatic Sea during World War I, taking part in the Adriatic campaign. At 05:00 on 22 December 1916 she got underway to reinforce Italian Regia Marina (Royal Navy) and French Navy ships in action against Austro-Hungarian Navy warships near the Strait of Otranto. She did not arrive on the scene in time to take part in the action.

On 24 December 1916, Carlo Mirabello and the destroyers Impavido and Ippolito Nievo supported an operation by the motor torpedo boats MAS 3 and MAS 6, which, towed respectively by the coastal torpedo boats 36 PN and 54 AS, were supposed to attack Austro-Hungarian ships in port at Durrës (known to the Italians as Durazzo) on the coast of the Principality of Albania. The Italians aborted the attack when MAS 6 suffered damage in a collision with wreckage 3 nautical miles (5.6 km; 3.5 mi) from Durrës.

On the night of 14–15 May 1917, the Battle of the Strait of Otranto began when the Austro-Hungarian Navy staged a two-pronged attack against the Otranto Barrage in the Strait of Otranto aimed both at destroying naval drifters — armed fishing boats that patrolled the anti-submarine barrier the barrage formed — and, as a diversionary action, at destroying an Italian convoy bound from Greece to Albania. That night, Carlo Mirabello was cruising in the Strait of Otranto between Durrës and the Cape of Rodon (known to the Italians as Cape Rodoni) with the French Navy destroyers Bisson, Cimeterre, and Commandant Rivière. At 04:30 on 15 May, the four ships were diverted to the south to intercept the Austro-Hungarians. At around 06:00, they sighted smoke off the starboard bow which turned out to be from the Austro-Hungarian scout cruisers Helgoland, Novara, and Saida, which had just sunk 14 drifters in the Otranto Barrage. Carlo Mirabello and the French destroyers steered southwest to close with the three Austro-Hungarian ships, and at 07:10 opened fire on them at a range of 8,000 metres (8,700 yards). As the Italian and French ships chased the Austro-Hungarians during the ensuing exchange of gunfire, Carlo Mirabello twice had to turn to avoid torpedoes fired by Austro-Hungarian submarines, causing her and the French destroyers to fall farther behind the austro-Hungarian ships. Carlo Mirabello hit the cruiser Novara two times during the early part of the battle, while at 10.04 she also hit the cruiser Helgoland. Later british and other Italian ships also intercepted the Austro-Hungarian ships and scored hits on them, but the Austro-Hungarians returned to base despite suffering damage.

On 10 March 1918, the destroyer Antonio Mosto, with the motor torpedo boat MAS 100 in tow, and Ippolito Nievo, towing MAS 99, set out for a raid on Portorož (known to the Italians as Portorose) on the coast of Austria-Hungary, supported by Carlo Mirabello, her sister ship Augusto Riboty, the scout cruisers Alessandro Poerio and Cesare Rossarol, the destroyers Giacinto Carini and Pilade Bronzetti, and a French Navy destroyer squadron led by the destroyer Casque. Antonio Mosto, Ippolito Nievo, MAS 99, and MAS 100 reached the vicinity of Portorož, but then had to postpone the operation due to bad weather. The ships attempted the raid again on 16 March, but adverse weather again forced its postponement. They made a third attempt on 8 April 1918, but after aerial reconnaissance ascertained that the port of Portorož was empty, the Italians again called off the operation.

At 18:10 on 12 May 1918, Pilade Bronzetti, with MAS 99 in tow, and Ippolito Nievo, towing MAS 100, got underway with Carlo Mirabello and Augusto Riboty from Brindisi, Italy, for a raid against the roadstead at Durrës. At 23:00, MAS 99 and MAS 100 dropped their tow cables about 10 nautical miles (19 km; 12 mi) from Durrës, then entered the harbor. At 02:30 on 13 May MAS 99 torpedoed the steamer Bregenz, which sank a few minutes later with the loss of 234 men. The attack triggered a violent Austro-Hungarian reaction, but all the Italian ships returned unscathed to Brindisi, where Carlo Mirabello moored at 07:30.

By late October 1918, Austria-Hungary had effectively disintegrated, and the Armistice of Villa Giusti, signed on 3 November 1918, went into effect on 4 November 1918 and brought hostilities between Austria-Hungary and the Allies to an end. After getting underway from Brindisi, Carlo Mirabello and her sister ship Carlo Alberto Racchia arrived at the island of Vis (known to the Italians as Lissa) at 0900 on 9 November and took possession of it for the Kingdom of Italy. The war ended two days later with the armistice between the Allies and the German Empire on 11 November 1918. During the war, Carlo Mirabello took part in 65 operations.

=== Interwar period ===
In the aftermath of World War I, Carlo Mirabello was stationed at Cattaro. On 15 March 1924, she escorted the scout cruiser Brindisi as Brindisi transported King Victor Emmanuel III to Fiume for a ceremony to annex Fiume to Italy.

In 1924, while under the command of Capitano di fregata (Frigate Captain) Wladimiro Pini, Carlo Mirabello conducted an 11,000-nautical-mile (20,400 km; 12,700 mi) cruise during which she visited 19 countries. Departing Venice, Italy, on 24 April, her cruise took her through the Adriatic Sea and the Mediterranean Sea, calling at Zadar in the Kingdom of the Serbs, Croats, and Slovenes (later renamed the Kingdom of Yugoslavia); Brindisi, Messina, and Castellammare del Golfo in Italy; Algiers in Algeria; and Gibraltar. She then passed through the Strait of Gibraltar into the Atlantic Ocean and steamed up the Tagus to Lisbon, Portugal. Returning to the Atlantic, she stopped at Corcubión in Spain and Brest in France. After transiting the Strait of Dover and entering the North Sea, she visited Belgium, calling at Antwerp and steaming up the Scheldt and through the Brussels–Rupel Maritime Canal to Brussels. Returning to the North Sea, she visited Norway, stopping at Flekkefjord before passing through the Oslofjord and reaching Oslo. She then visited Gothenburg, Sweden. After a transit of the Danish Straits, she entered the Baltic Sea and stopped at Karlskrona and Stockholm in Sweden and Turku and Helsinki in Finland before traveling up the Neva to Leningrad in the Soviet Union. She next called at Tallinn in Estonia, Riga and Libau in Latvia, the Free City of Danzig and its port of Zoppot, Stettin and Sassnitz in Germany, Copenhagen in Denmark, and Lübeck, and Travemünde in Germany. Departing the Baltic, she visited Hamburg in Germany and Rotterdam in the Netherlands before again transiting the Strait of Dover into the English Channel, where she called at Cherbourg, France. Again entering the Atlantic, she stopped at Portugalete in Spain and made a second visit to Lisbon before passing through the Strait of Gibraltar and calling at Almería, Spain. Her voyage concluded at La Spezia, Italy, on 30 October 1924.

Carlo Mirabello finished first in a Regia Marina gunnery competition in 1925. She subsequently underwent modifications which saw the installation of two 40-millimetre automatic cannon, new hydrophones, and new depth charge equipment. She also took part in various voyages around the Mediterranean Sea.

Between October 1936 and September 1938, Carlo Mirabello participated in Fascist Italy′s military intervention in Spain during the Spanish Civil War. She operated both in the Western Mediterranean and along the Atlantic coast of Spain during this period.

In 1938, Carlo Mirabello was reclassified as a destroyer. Her growing obsolescence — her maximum speed had dropped to 27 knots (50 km/h; 31 mph), and she lacked a fire-control center — led the Regia Marina to decide to make plans to decommission her by 1940.

=== World War II ===
World War II broke out in September 1939 with Nazi Germany's invasion of Poland. Fascist Italy joined the war on the side of the Axis powers with its invasion of France on 10 June 1940. At the time, Carlo Mirabello was based at Brindisi with her sister ship Augusto Riboty as part of the destroyer division there. The outbreak of war prompted the Regia Marina to keep Carlo Mirabello in commission. Taking part in the Adriatic campaign and the broader Battle of the Mediterranean, she operated mainly on escort duty along the shipping routes in the southern Adriatic Sea and the Ionian Sea, escorting convoys between Italy, the Italian protectorate of Albania, and the Kingdom of Greece.

In October 1940, Carlo Mirabello and Augusto Riboty were assigned temporarily to the Forza Navale Speciale (Special Naval Force). Tasked with occupying Corfu, the force, commanded by Ammiraglio di squadra (Squadron Admiral) Vittorio Tur, also included the light cruiser Bari (Tur's flagship), the light cruiser Taranto, the torpedo boats Altair, Andromeda, Angelo Bassini, Antares, Aretusa, Giacomo Medici, and Nicola Fabrizi, and the tankers Garigliano, Sesia, and Tirso. Plans called for merchant ships to land the Royal Army's 47th Infantry Division "Bari" and a battalion of the Regia Marina′s Regiment "San Marco" on Corfu on 28 October 1940 — the day the Greco–Italian War broke out with Italy's invasion of Greece — but the amphibious landing was postponed due to rough seas, first to 30 October, then to 31 October, and then again to 2 November before it was cancelled because of the disappointing performance of Italian forces on the Greek front. The 47th Infantry Division "Bari" was reassigned to operations on the front in Epirus, and the merchant ships proceeded to Vlorë (known to the Italians as Valona) in Albania to disembark the division there.

Carlo Mirabello returned to her escort duties. On 20 May 1941 she got underway from Brindisi with the auxiliary cruiser Brindisi to escort the cargo ships Annarella and Laura C. and the tankers Anna C. and Strombo to Patras, Greece. At 05:40 on 21 May, Carlo Mirabello′s crew witnessed an explosion between 5 and 8 nautical miles (9.3 and 14.8 km; 5.8 and 9.2 mi) away off Lefkada in the Ionian Islands: It was the Italian gunboat Pellegrino Matteucci, which had struck a mine. Carlo Mirabello headed towards the scene and prepared to lower a lifeboat, but then herself hit a mine belonging to a barrage laid the previous night by the British minelayer HMS Abdiel. The explosion blew off Carlo Mirabello′s bow as far back as her bridge. She drifted for nearly six hours after the explosion while her crew tried in vain to save her. Finally, the Italians decided to scuttle her with explosive charges, and at 11:45 she sank 2 nautical miles (3.7 km; 2.3 mi) south of Lefkada. Of the ship's crew, Brindisi rescued 63 men and many others swam to shore or were rescued by other ships, but 44 were reported dead or missing.

== Bibliography ==
- Brescia, Maurizio (2012). Mussolini's Navy: A Reference Guide to the Regina Marina 1930–45. Annapolis, Maryland: Naval Institute Press. ISBN 978-1-59114-544-8.
- Favre, Franco. La Marina nella Grande Guerra. Le operazioni navali, aeree, subacquee e terrestri in Adriatico (in Italian).
- Fraccaroli, Aldo (1970). Italian Warships of World War I. London: Ian Allan. ISBN 0-7110-0105-7.
- Fraccaroli, Aldo (1968). Italian Warships of World War II. Shepperton, UK: Ian Allan. ISBN 0-7110-0002-6.
- Gray, Randal, ed. (1985). Conway's All the World's Fighting Ships 1906–1921. Annapolis, Maryland: Naval Institute Press. ISBN 978-0-87021-907-8.
- Roberts, John (1980). "Italy". In Chesneau, Roger (ed.). Conway's All the World's Fighting Ships 1922–1946. New York: Mayflower Books. pp. 280–317. ISBN 0-8317-0303-2.
- Rohwer, Jürgen (2005). Chronology of the War at Sea 1939–1945: The Naval History of World War Two (Third Revised ed.). Annapolis, Maryland: Naval Institute Press. ISBN 1-59114-119-2.
- Whitley, M. J. (1988). Destroyers of World War 2: An International Encyclopedia. Annapolis, Maryland: Naval Institute Press. ISBN 1-85409-521-8.
