= Museo Nazionale dell'Automobile =

Museo Nazionale dell'Automobile di Torino
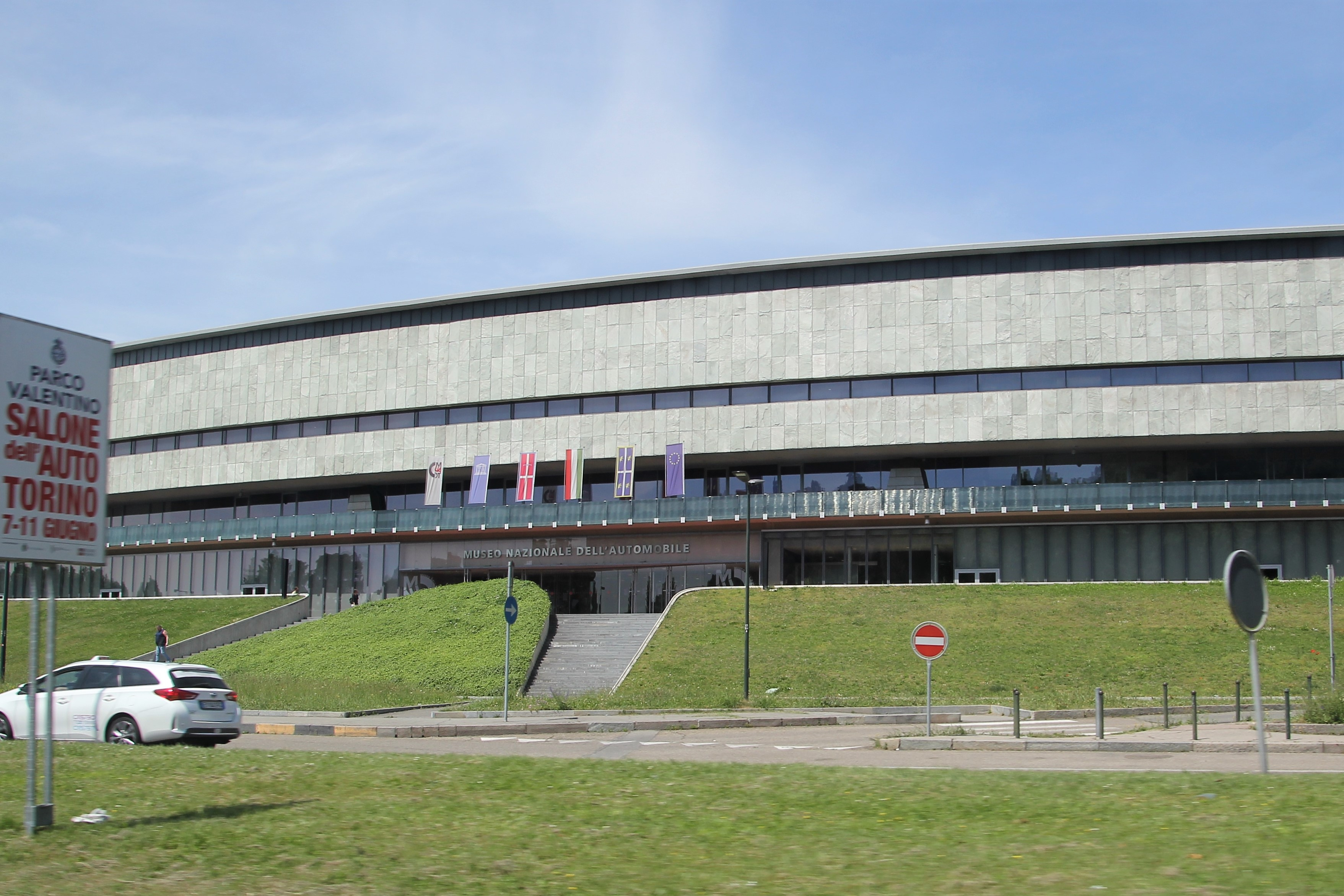
- The façade of the Museo Nazionale dell'Automobile.

- Location within Turin
- Established: 3 November 1960; 65 years ago
- Location: Corso Unità d'Italia 40, Turin, Italy
- Coordinates: 45.0318545°N 7.6713941°E
- Type: Automobile museum
- Collections: Cars and automibiles
- Director: Mariella Mengozzi
- Website: www.museoauto.com

The Museo Nazionale dell'Automobile di Torino (English: "National Automobile Museum"), known as MAUTO, is an automobile museum in Turin, Italy, founded by Carlo Biscaretti di Ruffia. The museum has a collection of almost 200 cars among eighty automobile brands representing eight countries (Italy, France, Great Britain, Germany, Netherlands, Spain, United States of America, Poland). The museum is situated in a building dating from 1960, and it has three floors. After restructuring in 2011 the museum is open again, and its exhibition area has been expanded from 11,000 square metres (120,000 sq ft) to 19,000 square metres (200,000 sq ft). The museum also has its own library, documentation centre, bookshop and auditorium.

== Collection ==
The museum's collection includes the first Italian cars, a Bernardi from 1896 and a Fiat from 1899, a Rolls-Royce Silver Ghost from 1914, and racing cars by Ferrari and Alfa Romeo. Also included are for instance an 1893 Benz Victoria, an 1894 Peugeot, a 1904 Oldsmobile, the 1907 Itala from the Peking to Paris race, a 1913 De Dion-Bouton, a 1916 Ford T and the 1929 Isotta Fraschini Tipo 8A that starred in Sunset Boulevard.

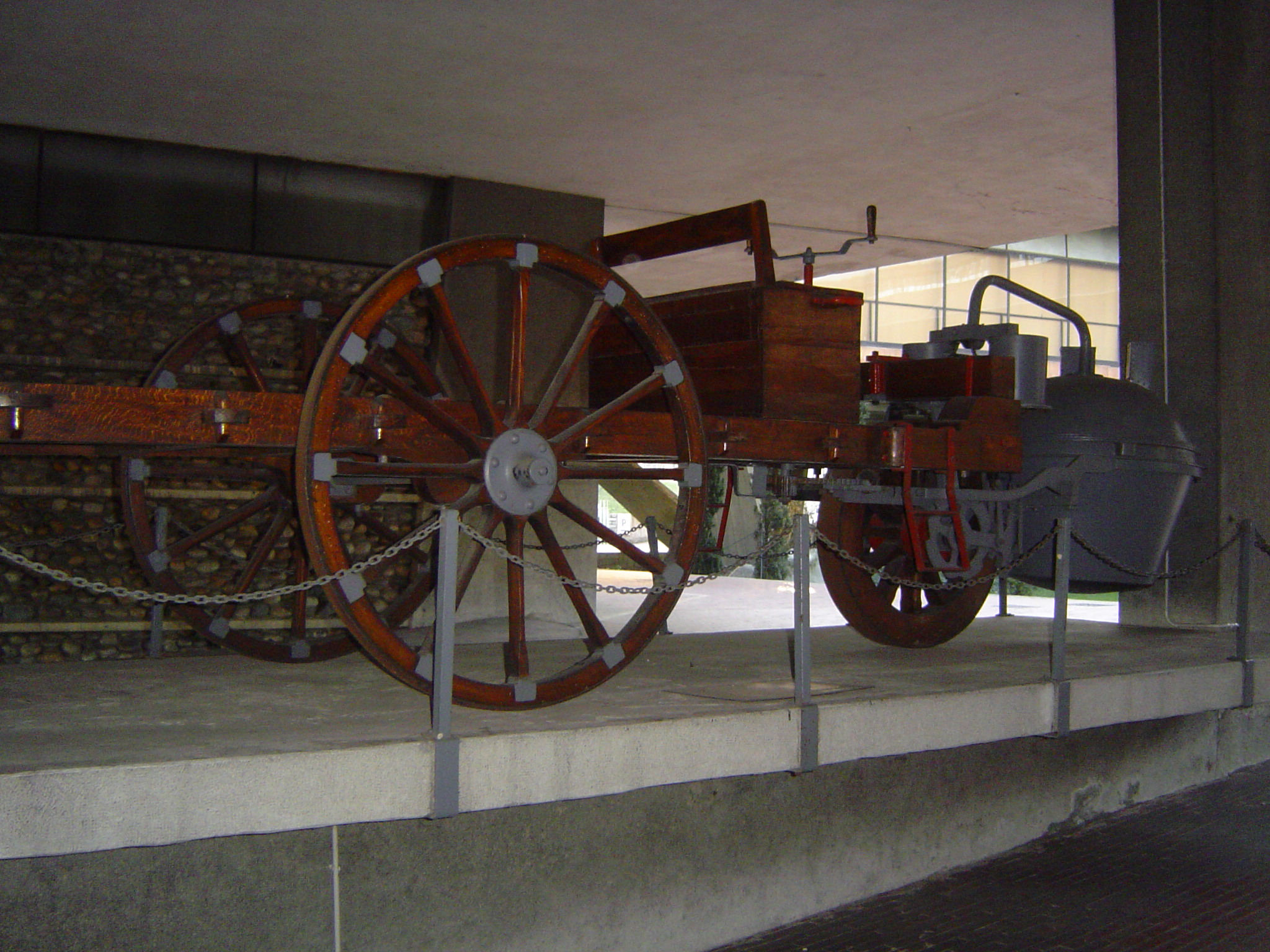
Reproduction of Cugnot's vehicle

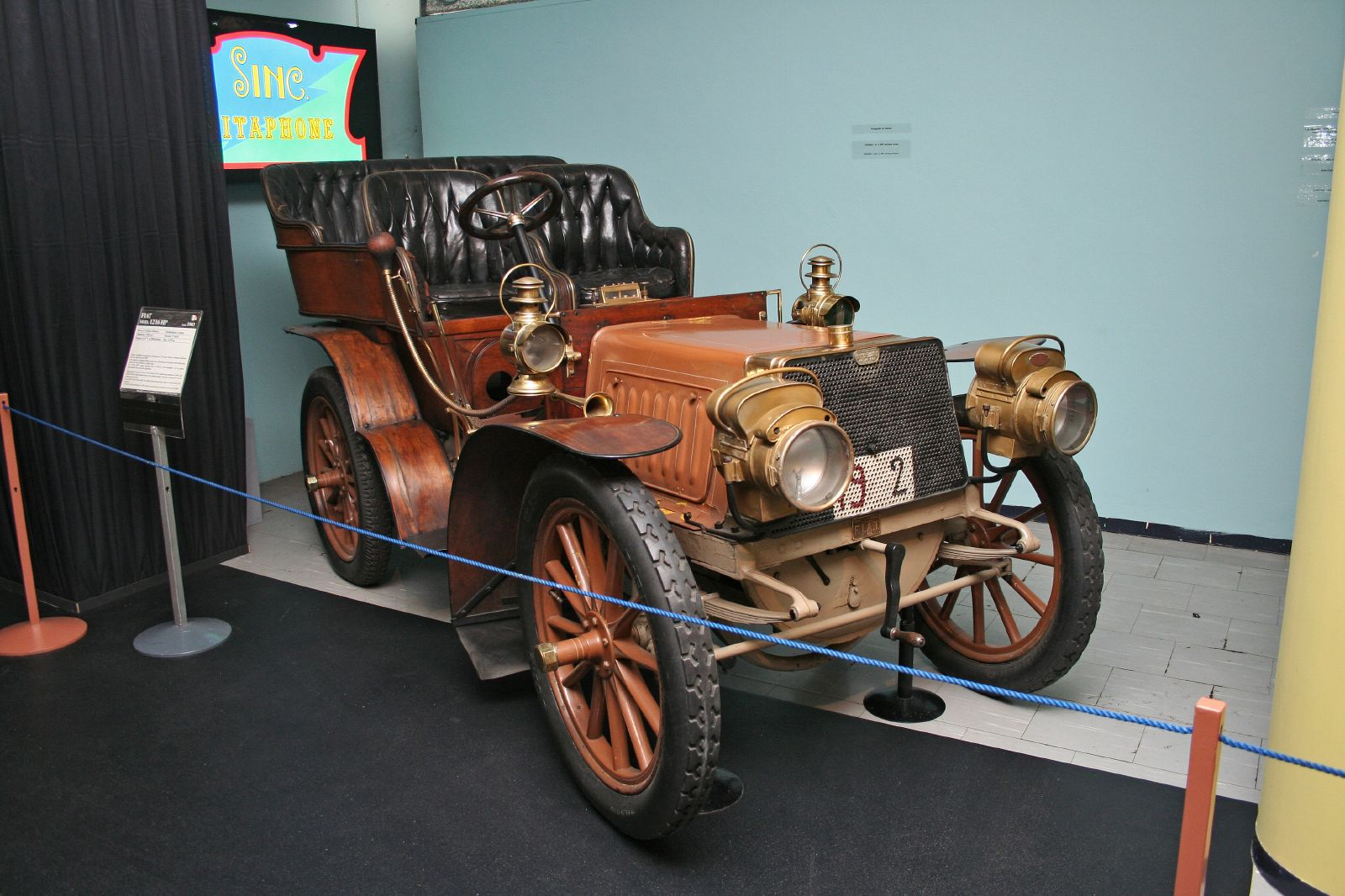
Fiat 12 HP

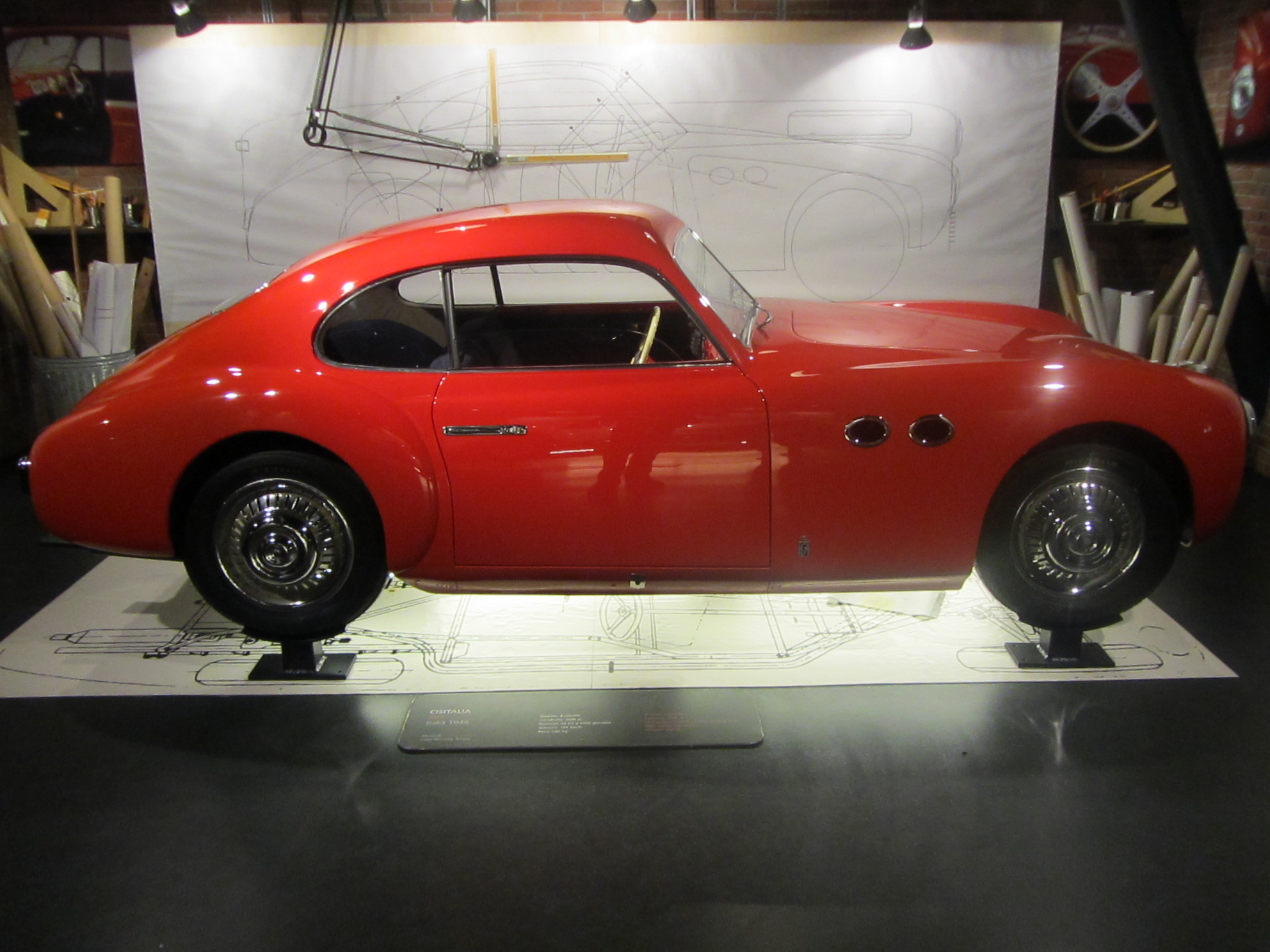
Cisitalia 202

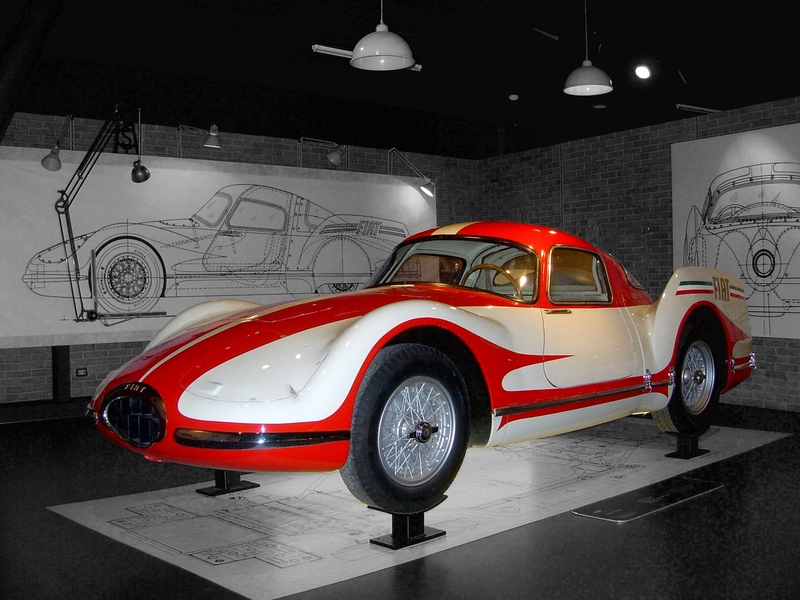
Fiat Turbina

== Documentation Centre ==
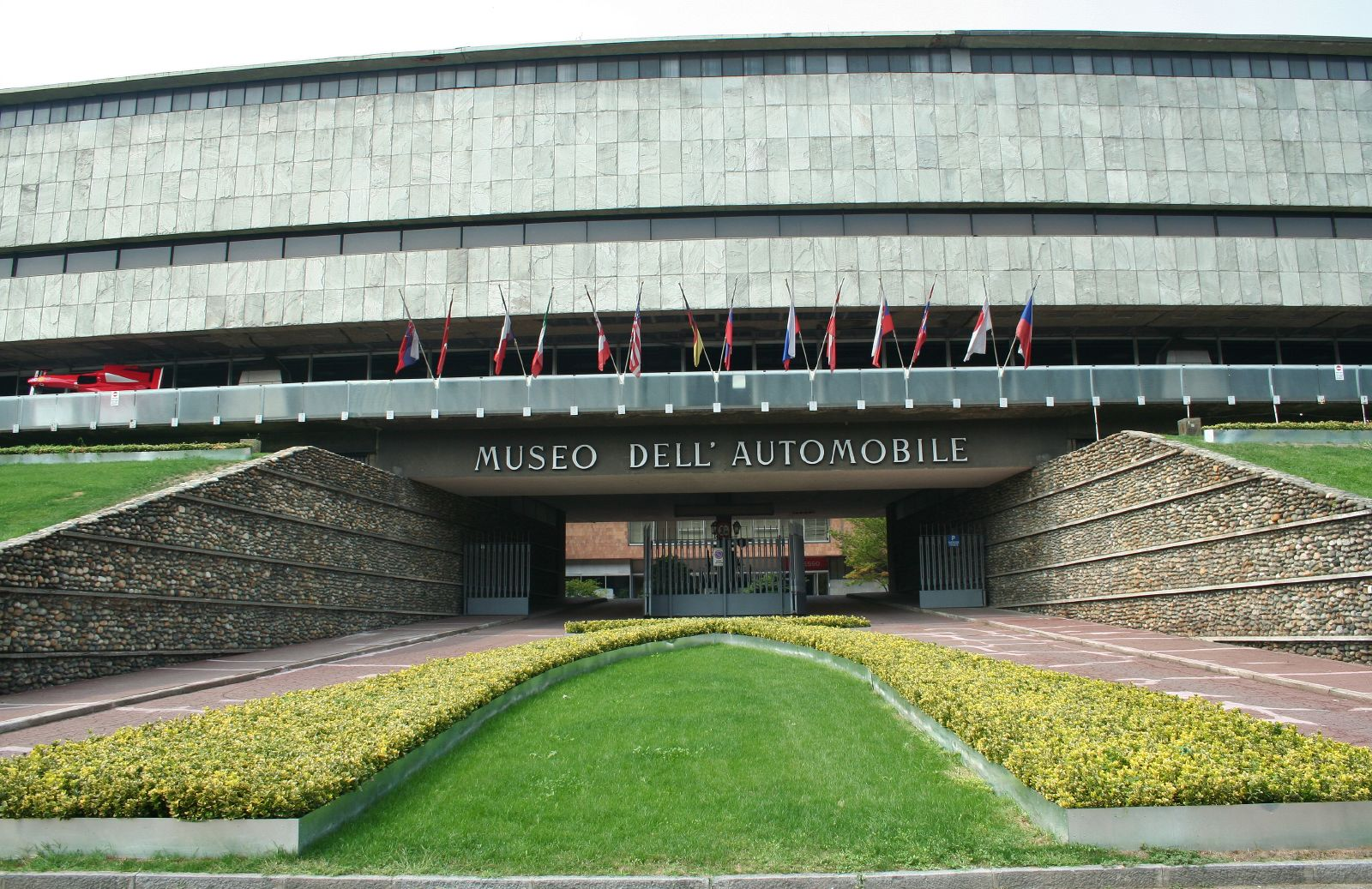
The entrance to the museum building, work of architect Amedeo Albertini, before the 2011 restoration.

The Documentation Centre collects historical data sheets, photographs, documents, sales brochures, construction diagrams, and everything related to cars that they were able to collect over the years. The collection consists of photographs by tens of thousands of prints in black and white and it works in conjunction with the Ministry for Cultural Heritage.

Museum building photographed by Paolo Monti, 1961

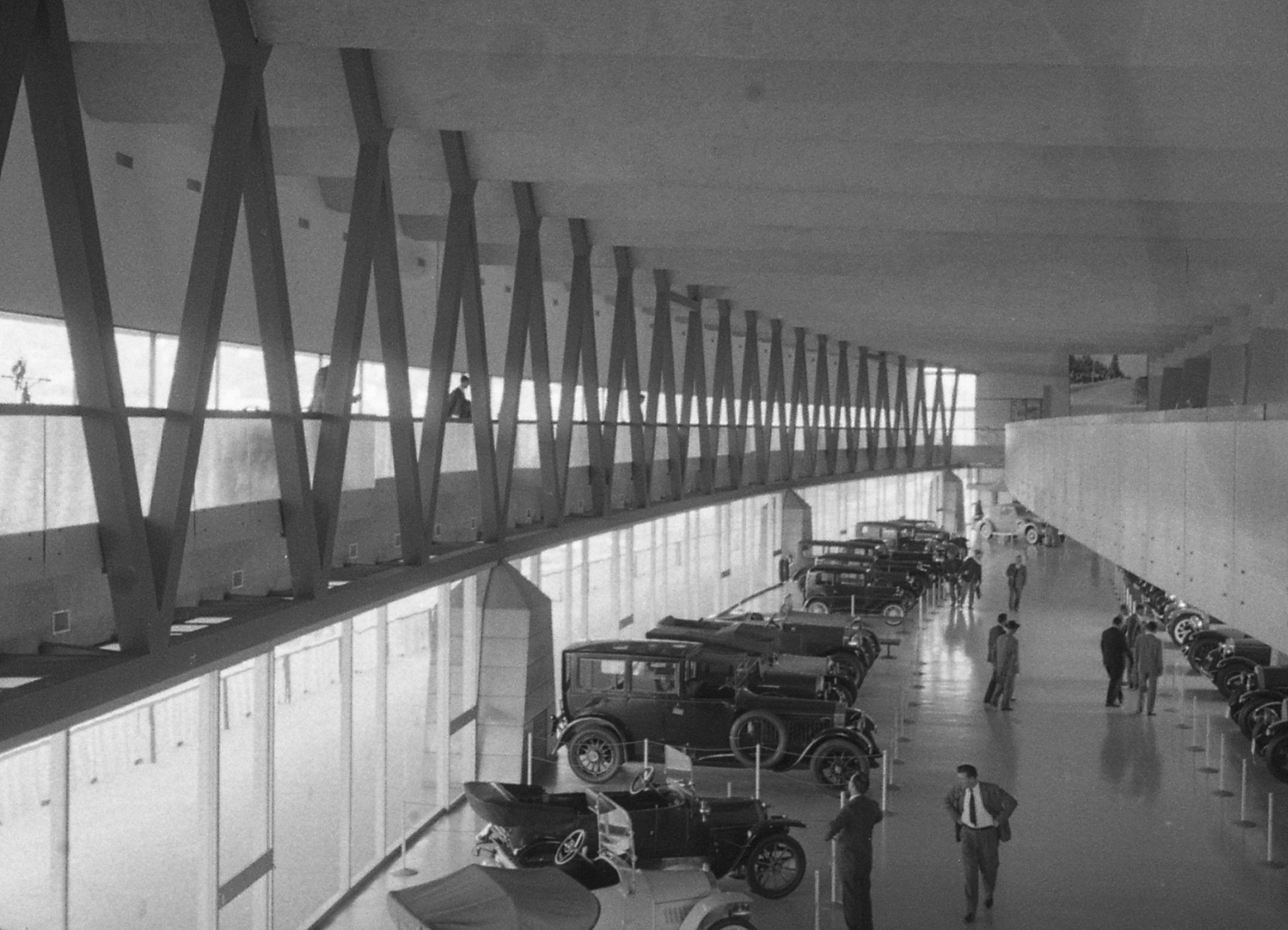
Interior

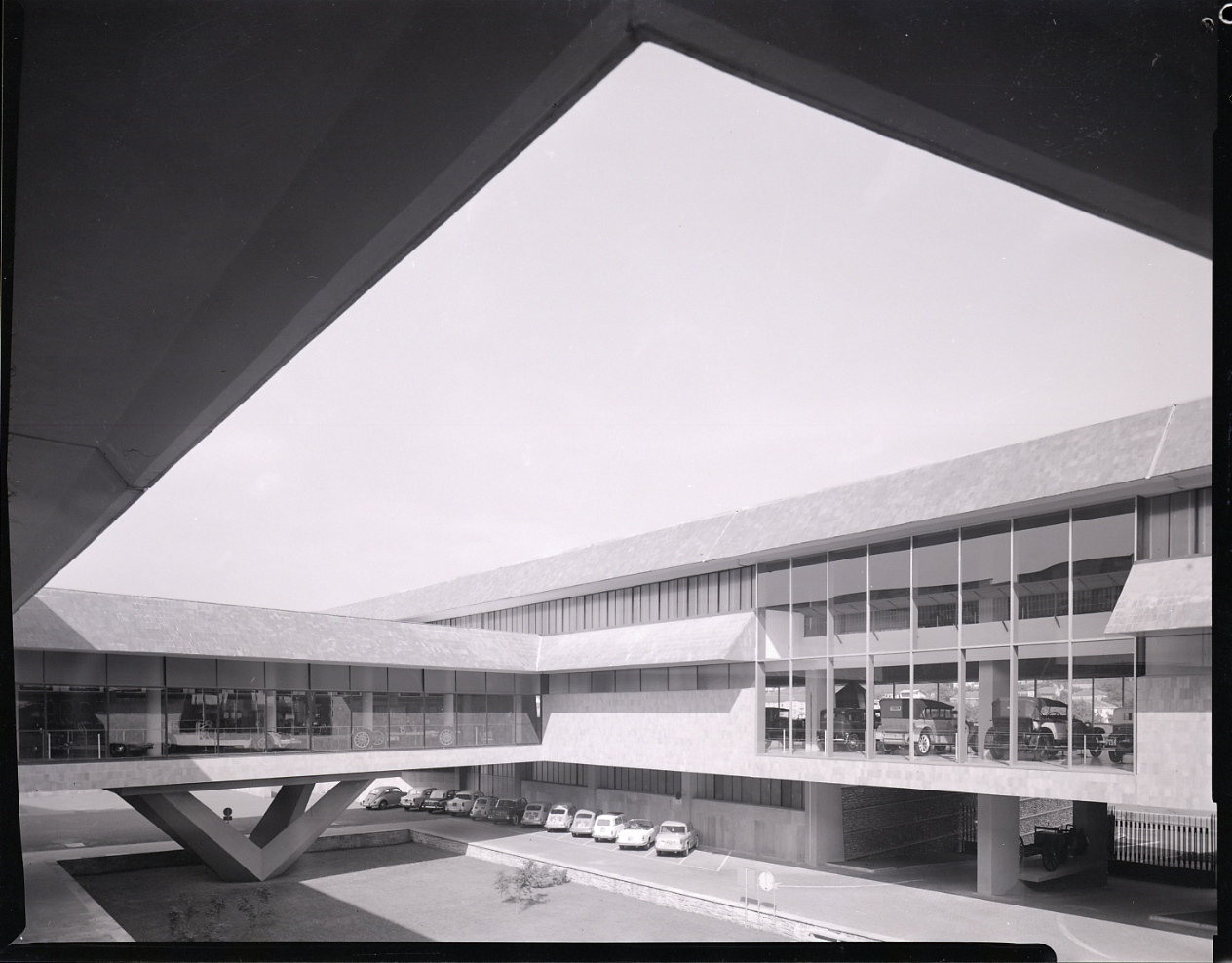
Exterior

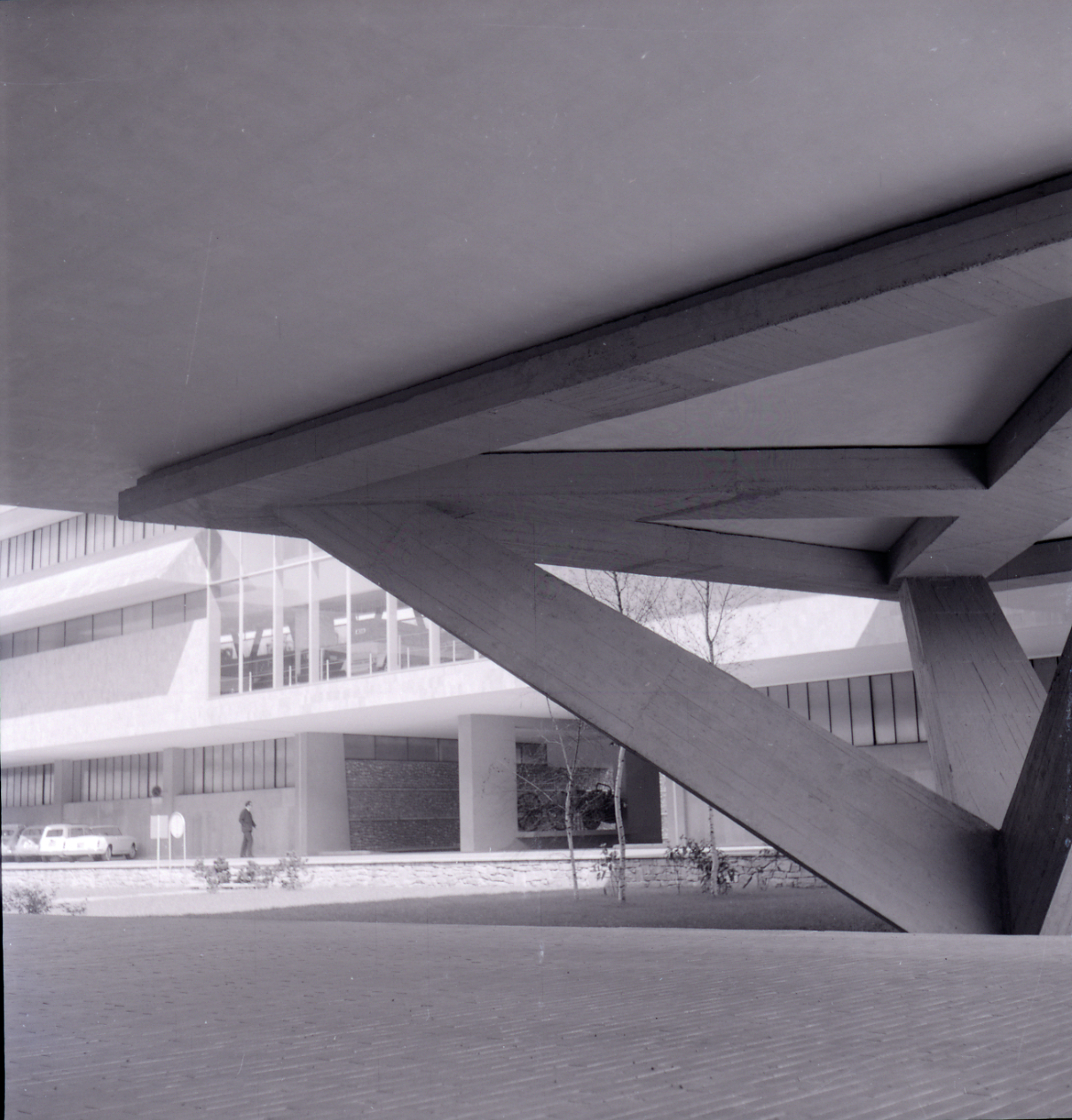
Detail

== Library ==
The museum's library holds about 7,000 texts, most of them out of print and hard to find. It is divided into seven sections (history of locomotion, history of brands, racing, technology, biographies, economy, and others). Most of the volumes date back to the first phases of the automotive industry, from the beginning until the 1950s.
