= Italian destroyer Carlo Alberto Racchia =

Scout cruiser of the Regia Marina

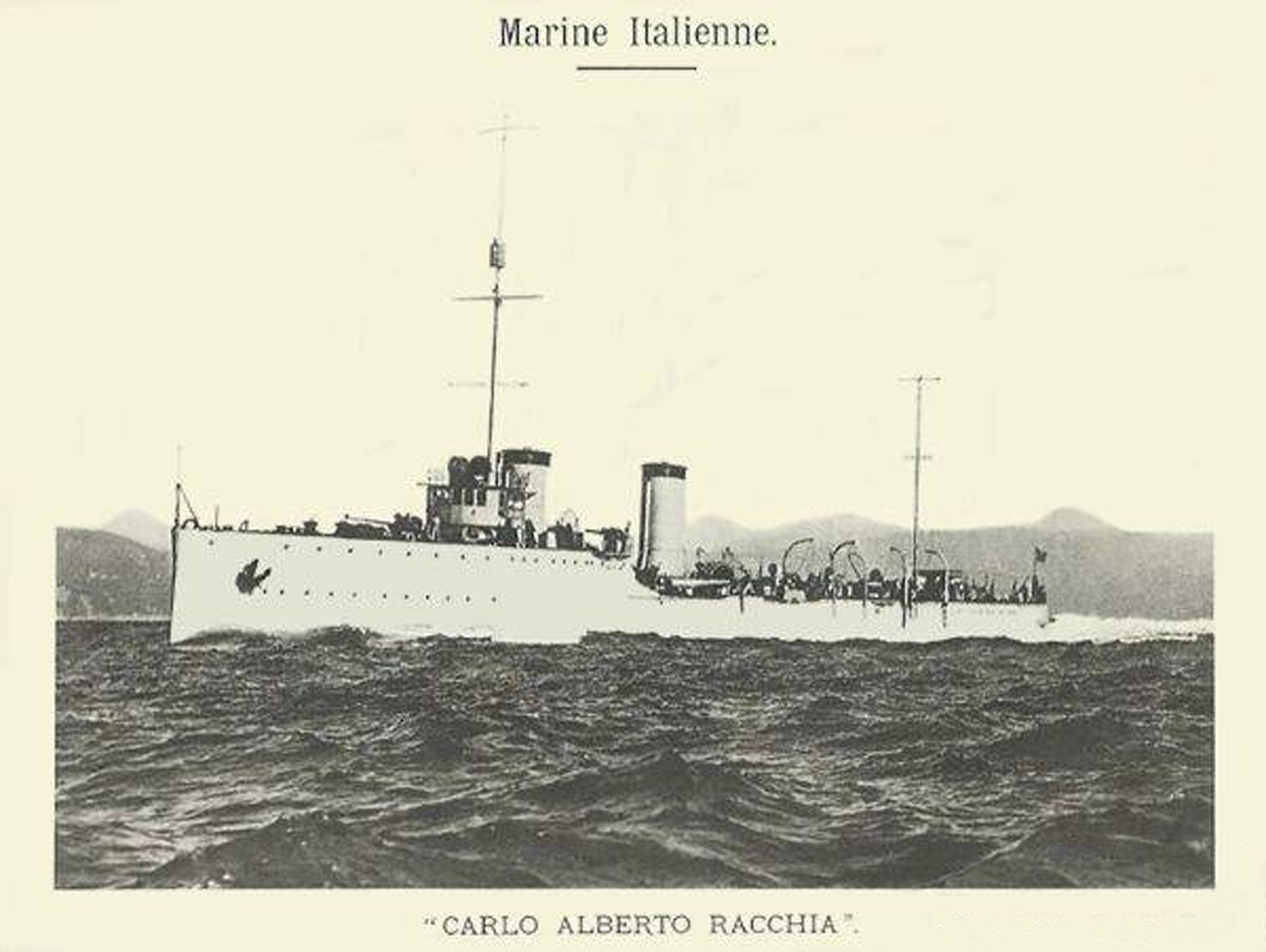
- Carlo Alberto Racchia in 1916.

History

Kingdom of Italy
- Name: Carlo Alberto Racchia
- Namesake: Carlo Alberto Racchia (1833–1896), Italian admiral and politician
- Builder: Gio. Ansaldo & C., Sestri Ponente, Italy
- Laid down: 10 December 1914
- Launched: 2 June 1916
- Completed: 21 December 1916
- Fate: Sunk by mine 21 July 1920
- Stricken: 1922

General characteristics (as built)
- Class & type: Mirabello-class destroyer
- Displacement: 1,784 t (1,756 long tons) (normal); 2,040 t (2,010 long tons) (deep load)
- Length: 103.75 m (340 ft 5 in)
- Beam: 9.74 m (31 ft 11 in)
- Draught: 3.3 m (10 ft 10 in)
- Installed power: 4 Yarrow boilers; 44,000 hp (33,000 kW)
- Propulsion: 2 shafts; 2 geared steam turbines
- Speed: 35 knots (65 km/h; 40 mph)
- Range: 2,300 nmi (4,300 km) at 12 knots (22 km/h; 14 mph)
- Complement: 8 officers and 161 enlisted men
- Armament: 1 × single 152 mm (6 in) gun; 7 × single 102 mm (4 in) guns; 2 × single 76 mm (3 in) AA guns; 2 × twin 450 mm (17.7 in) torpedo tubes; 100 mines

Carlo Alberto Racchia was one of three Mirabello-class scout cruisers built for the Italian Regia Marina (Royal Navy) during World War I. She fought in that war's Adriatic campaign and took part in the largest surface action of the campaign, the Battle of the Strait of Otranto, in May 1917. After the war, she struck a mine and sank in 1920.

In 1938, eighteen years after Carlo Alberto Racchia sank, the Regia Marina reclassified the Mirabello-class ships as destroyers.

== Design and description ==
The ships were designed as scout cruisers (esploratori), essentially enlarged versions of contemporary destroyers. They had an overall length of 103.75 meters (340 ft 5 in), a beam of 9.74 meters (31 ft 11 in) and a mean draft of 3.3 meters (10 ft 10 in). They displaced 1,784 tonnes (1,756 long tons) at standard load, and 2,040 tonnes (2,010 long tons) at deep load. Their complement was 8 officers and 161 enlisted men.

The Mirabellos were powered by two Parsons geared steam turbines, each driving one propeller shaft using steam supplied by four Yarrow boilers. The turbines were rated at 44,000 shaft horsepower (33,000 kW) for a speed of 35 knots (65 km/h; 40 mph) and Carlo Alberto Racchia reached a speed of 35.4 knots (65.6 km/h; 40.7 mph) from 43,190 shp (32,210 kW) during her sea trials. The ships carried enough fuel oil to give them a range of 2,300 nautical miles (4,300 km; 2,600 mi) at a speed of 12 knots (22 km/h; 14 mph).

Carlo Alberto Racchia's main battery consisted of a single Cannone da 152 mm (6 in)/40 A Modello 1891 gun forward of the superstructure. The gun was backed up by seven Cannone da 102 mm (4 in)/35 S Modello 1914 guns in single mounts protected by gun shields, one aft the superstructure and the remaining guns positioned on the broadside amidships. Anti-aircraft (AA) defense for the Mirabello-class ships was provided by a pair of Cannone da 76 mm (3 in)/40 Modello 1916 AA guns in single mounts. They were equipped with four 450-millimeter (17.7 in) torpedo tubes in two twin mounts, one on each broadside. Carlo Alberto Racchia also could carry 100 mines.

=== Modifications ===
The gun proved to be too heavy for the ships and its rate of fire was too slow so it was replaced when the ships were rearmed with eight Cannone da 102/45 S, A Modello 1917 guns arranged with single guns fore and aft of the superstructure and the other on the broadside. The 76 mm guns were replaced by a pair of Cannone da 40 mm (1.6 in)/39 AA guns in single mounts in 1920–1922. It is uncertain if Carlo Alberto Racchia received these guns before her loss.

== Construction and commissioning ==
Carlo Alberto Racchia was laid down by Gio. Ansaldo & C. at Sestri Ponente, Kingdom of Italy, on 10 December 1914. She was launched on 2 June 1916 and completed and commissioned on 21 December 1916.

== Service history ==
=== World War I ===
After commissioning, Carlo Alberto Racchia was stationed at Brindisi, Italy. During World War I, she operated in the Adriatic Sea, participating in the Adriatic campaign against Austria-Hungary and the German Empire, taking part primarily in small naval actions involving clashes between torpedo boats and support operations for Allied motor torpedo boat and air attacks on Central Powers forces.

On the night of 14–15 May 1917, the Battle of the Strait of Otranto began when the Austro-Hungarian Navy staged a two-pronged attack against the Otranto Barrage in the Strait of Otranto aimed both at destroying naval drifters — armed fishing boats that patrolled the anti-submarine barrier the barrage formed — and, as a diversionary action, at destroying an Italian convoy bound from the Kingdom of Greece to the Principality of Albania. At 04:10 on 15 May, after receiving news of the attack, Carlo Alberto Racchia, the protected cruiser Marsala, the scout cruiser Aquila, the destroyers Impavido, Indomito, and Insidioso, and the British Royal Navy light cruiser HMS Liverpool made ready for sea at Brindisi. At 05:30 the formation left Brindisi together with the British light cruiser HMS Dartmouth and two other destroyers, joining various Allied naval formations steering to intercept the Austro-Hungarians. At 07:45 the Allied force sighted the Austro-Hungarian destroyers Balaton and Csepel. At 08:10, while Aquila and the Italian destroyers steered to attack the two Austro-Hungarian ships, Carlo Alberto Racchia, Dartmouth, Liverpool, and Marsala headed toward the Austro-Hungarian naval base at Cattaro in an attempt to cut off their retreat. Aquila and the Italian destroyers opened fire on Balaton and Csepel at 08:15. In the ensuing exchange of gunfire, Balaton suffered damage and immediately afterwards Aquila was hit and immobilized at 09:05. The Austro-Hungarian scout cruisers Helgoland, Novara, and Saida closed with Aquila. Dartmouth, the British light cruiser HMS Bristol, and the Italian destroyers Antonio Mosto and Giovanni Acerbi placed themselves between Aquila and the Austro-Hungarian ships and opened fire on them at 09:30 at a range of 8,500 metres (9,300 yd). The three Austro-Hungarian scout cruisers retreated toward the northwest and the British and Italian ships pursued them at distances of between 4,500 and 10,000 metres (4,900 and 10,900 yards), continuing to fire. The battle ended at 12:05 when the ships approached Cattaro, where the fleeing Austro-Hungarian ships took shelter under the cover of Austro-Hungarian coastal artillery batteries and the Austro-Hungarian armored cruiser Sankt Georg and destroyers Tátra and Warasdiner sortied to intervene in the engagement. After the battle ended, Aquila was towed back to port for repairs.

On 16 July 1917, Carlo Alberto Racchia put to sea together with her sister ship Augusto Riboty to provide distant support for a bombing raid on Durrës (known to the Italians as Durazzo) on the coast of Albania by 18 aircraft departing from Brindisi and Vlorë (known to the Italians as Valona) in Albania. During the night of 4–5 October 1917 Carlo Alberto Racchia and Aquila supported an air attack against Cattaro.

On 2 October 1918, while British and other Italian ships bombarded Austro-Hungarian positions at Durrës, Carlo Alberto Racchia and the battleship Dante Alighieri, the scout cruisers Cesare Rossarol, Guglielmo Pepe, and Alessandro Poerio and the destroyers Ippolito Nievo and Simone Schiaffino provided cover for the bombardment force, tasked with countering any attempt by Austro-Hungarian Navy ships based at Cattaro to interfere with the bombardment.

By late October 1918, Austria-Hungary had effectively disintegrated, and the Armistice of Villa Giusti, signed on 3 November 1918, went into effect on 4 November 1918 and brought hostilities between Austria-Hungary and the Allies to an end. After getting underway from Brindisi, Carlo Alberto Racchia and her sister ship Carlo Mirabello arrived at the island of Vis (known to the Italians as Lissa) at 0900 on 9 November and took possession of it for the Kingdom of Italy. The war ended two days later with the armistice between the Allies and the German Empire on 11 November 1918.

=== Post-war ===
On 20 March 1920, Carlo Alberto Racchia left Taranto, Italy, to move to Constantinople in the Ottoman Empire. After arriving at Constantinople, she began patrols of the Bosporus and the Black Sea.

Upon the conclusion of World War I, Italian troops had taken custody of 14,000 Russian troops that Austria-Hungary had captured during the war, and Italy had interned the Russians on the island of Asinara off the coast of Sardinia. At the initiative of the Italian Socialist Party, the Italian government decided to return the Russians to Russia, where the Russian Civil War was raging, and turn them over to the Bolsheviks. On 19 July 1920, Carlo Alberto Racchia got underway from Constantinople to escort a convoy made up of the steamers Calvi, Melpomene, and Thalia, which had embarked the Russians, for a voyage to Odessa. At 11:00 on 21 July 1920, Carlo Alberto Racchia was steaming 9 nautical miles (17 km; 10 mi) southwest of Cape Fontana and 19 nautical miles (35 km; 22 mi) from Odessa when she was shaken amidships by the explosion of a mine, perhaps one laid by the Ottoman Navy during World War I. The explosion killed 10 men and injured nine, and the ship sustained fatal damage. After her crew abandoned ship in an orderly fashion, Carlo Alberto Racchia sank by the bow in 11 metres (36 feet) of water about 40 minutes after the explosion. Calvi rescued her survivors.

After unsuccessful attempts to recover her wreck, the Regia Marina struck Carlo Alberto Racchia from its naval register in 1922.

In 1938, eighteen years after Carlo Alberto Racchia sank, the Regia Marina reclassified the Mirabello-class ships as destroyers.

== Bibliography ==
- Favre, Franco. La Marina nella Grande Guerra. Le operazioni navali, aeree, subacquee e terrestri in Adriatico (in Italian).
- Fraccaroli, Aldo (1970). Italian Warships of World War I. London: Ian Allan. ISBN 0-7110-0105-7.
- Gray, Randal, ed. (1985). Conway's All the World's Fighting Ships 1906–1921. Annapolis, Maryland: Naval Institute Press. ISBN 978-0-87021-907-8.
- McMurtrie, Francis E., ed. (1937). Jane's Fighting Ships 1937. London: Sampson Low. OCLC 927896922.
- Whitley, M. J. (1988). Destroyers of World War 2: An International Encyclopedia. Annapolis, Maryland: Naval Institute Press. ISBN 1-85409-521-8.
