= Italian submarine Jalea =

Jalea was the name of at least two ships of the Italian Navy and may refer to:

- Italian submarine Jalea (1913), a Medusa-class submarine launched in 1913 and sunk in 1915.
- Italian submarine Jalea (1932), an Argonauta-class submarine launched in 1932 and discarded in 1948.
