= Capo Zafferano Lighthouse =

Capo Zafferano
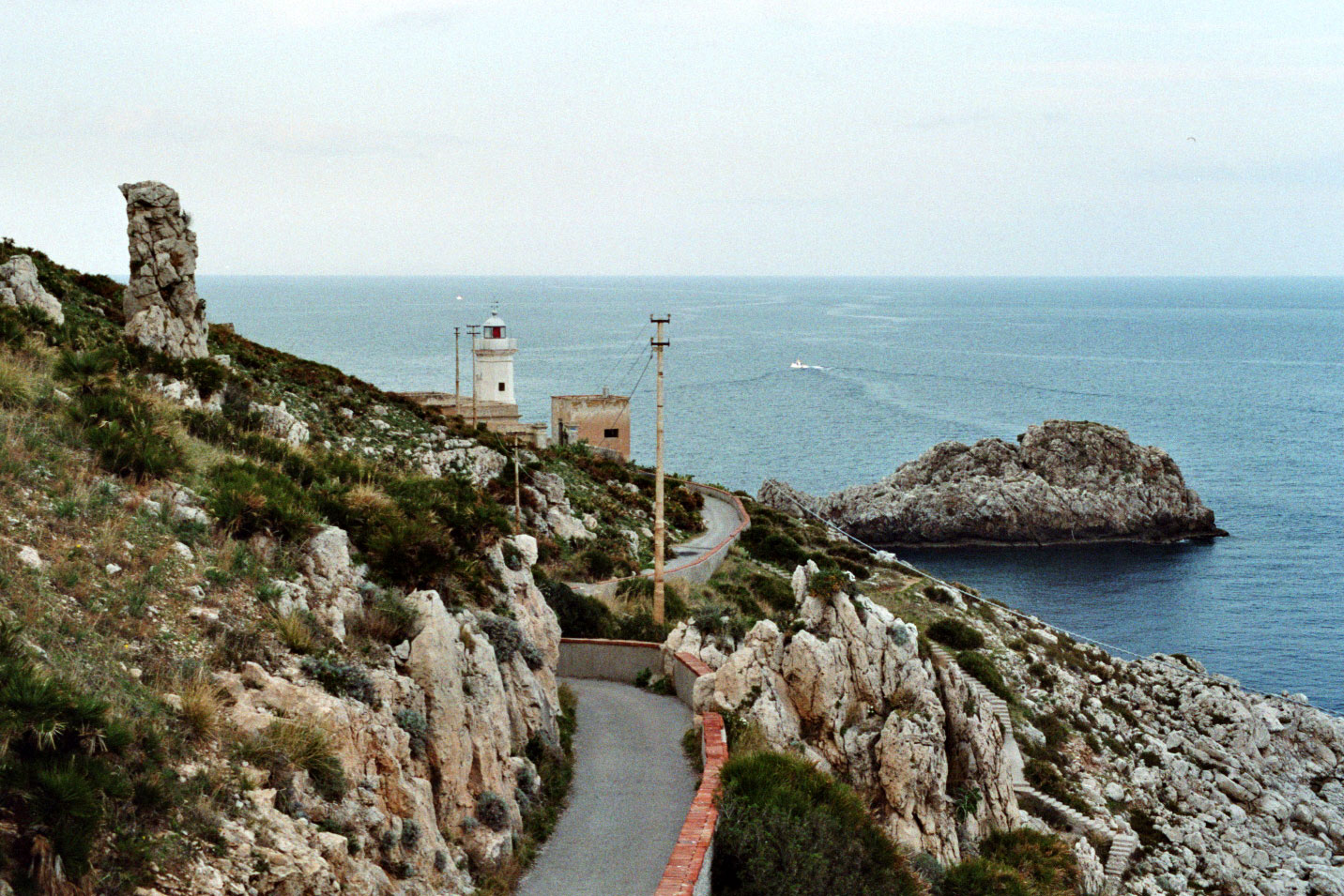
- Capo Zafferano Lighthouse
- Location: Capo Zafferano; Santa Flavia; Sicily; Italy
- Coordinates: 38°06′44″N 13°32′15″E

Tower
- Constructed: 1884
- Foundation: masonry base
- Construction: masonry tower
- Height: 11 metres (36 ft)
- Shape: octagonal tower with balcony and lantern attached to 1-storey keeper's house
- Markings: white tower and lantern, grey metallic lantern dome
- Power source: mains electricity
- Operator: Marina Militare

Light
- Focal height: 34 metres (112 ft)
- Lens: Type OF 500; Focal length: 250mm
- Intensity: main: AL 1000 W reserve: LABI 100 W
- Range: main: 16 nautical miles (30 km; 18 mi) reserve: 12 nautical miles (22 km; 14 mi)
- Characteristic: Fl (3) WR 10s.
- Italy no.: 3244 E.F.

Capo Zafferano Lighthouse (Italian: Faro di Capo Zafferano) is an active lighthouse located at the extreme tip of the homonymy promontory, under a steep ridge, that marks the eastern entrance to the port of Palermo. The lighthouse is in the municipality of Santa Flavia on the Tyrrhenian Sea.

== History ==
The lighthouse was built in 1884 and when the Marina Militare automated it the keeper's house was abandoned and went entirely in ruin due to negligence and vandalic raids. In 2016 the Agenzia del Demanio, who run the State ownership buildings including the lighthouses, decided to give it in concession with a request for tenders to a private for 50 years. The lighthouse has been given to a restoration firm run by a local chef. It will be transformed into a multipurpose building with a taste store, a restaurant, three suites, and a Museum of the Sea.

== Description ==
The lighthouse consists of a masonry octagonal tower, 11 metres (36 ft) high, with balcony and lantern attached to the seaward side of 1-storey keeper's house. The tower and the lantern are white; the lantern dome is grey metallic. The light is positioned at 34 metres (112 ft) above sea level and emits three white or red flashes, depending on the direction, in a 10 seconds period visible up to a distance of 16 nautical miles (30 km; 18 mi). The lighthouse is completely automated and managed by the Marina Militare with the identification code number 3244 E.F.

== See also ==
- List of lighthouses in Italy
