= Guido Biscaretti di Ruffia =

Italian soldier and politician (1867–1946)

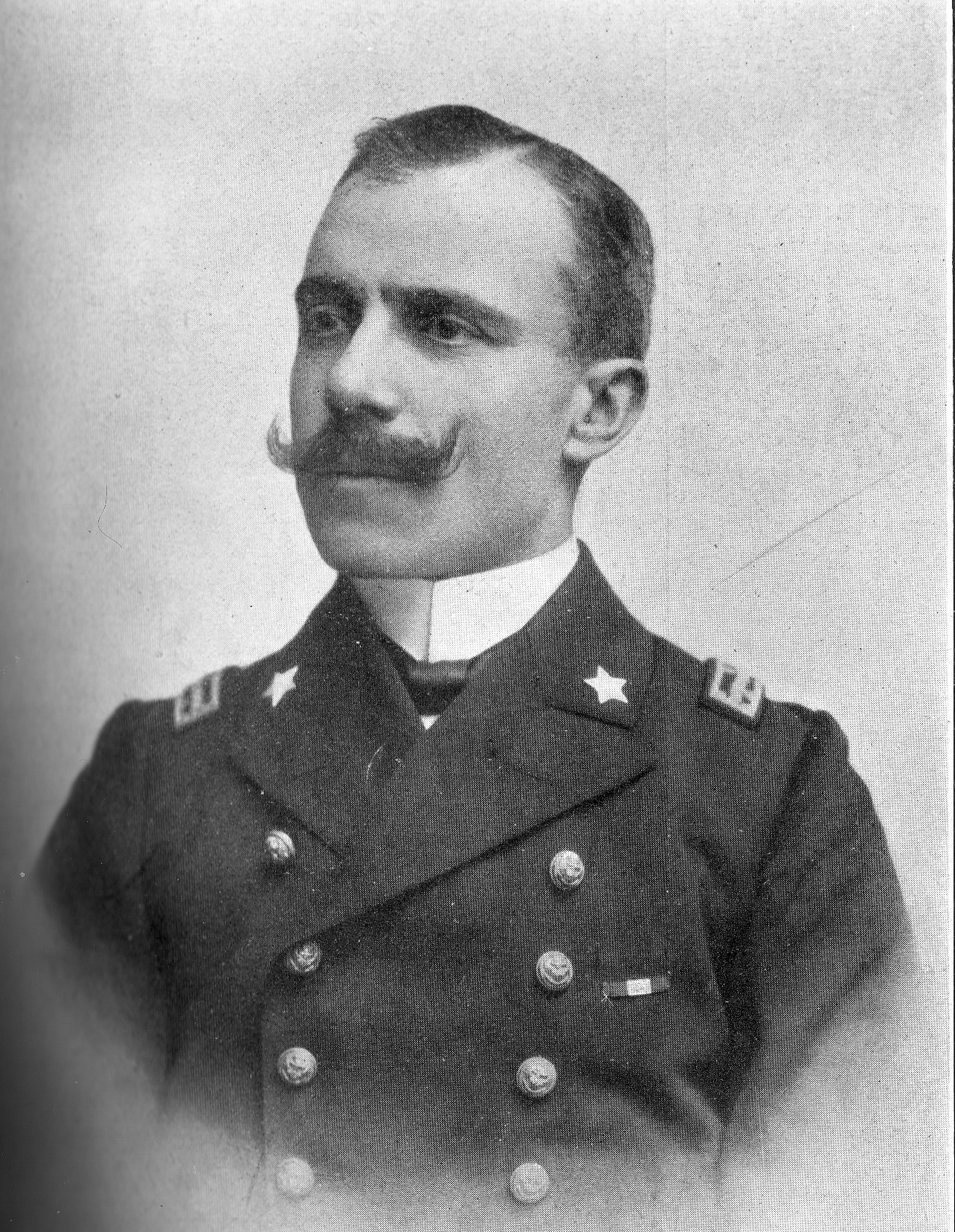

Senator of the Kingdom of Italy
- In office 12 November 1931 – 5 August 1943
- Monarch: Victor Emmanuel III
- Prime Minister: Benito Mussolini

Personal details
- Born: 28 October 1867 Turin, Piedmont, Italy
- Died: 21 October 1946 (aged 78) Rome, Italy

Military service
- Allegiance: Kingdom of Italy
- Branch: Regia Marina
- Years of service: 1881–1943
- Rank: Squadron admiral
- Battles/wars: Italo-Turkish War; Battle of Preveza; World War I; Adriatic Campaign

Guido Biscaretti di Ruffia (28 October 1867 – 21 October 1946) was an Italian admiral and politician.

== Biography ==
Di Ruffia was the son of Roberto Biscaretti di Ruffia, a senator of the Kingdom of Italy who established Fiat in 1899, and noblewoman Beatrice Ferrero. He was the brother of technical designer Carlo Biscaretti di Ruffia and grandson of senator and general Carlo Biscaretti di Ruffia.

Having committed to a naval career, di Ruffia enrolled in the Italian Naval Academy on 18 October 1881. He became a member of the Società Geografica Italiana in 1908 and developed an interest in military cartography for the Italian Regia Marina ("Royal Navy"). From 1911 to 1912, he participated in the Italo-Turkish War with the rank of frigate captain in command of the destroyer Artigliere. On 21 May 1916, during World War I, he was appointed aide-de-camp to King Victor Emmanuel III, and maintained the honorary title until 1917.

On 10 August 1923, di Ruffia became President of the Superior Navy Council, a post he held until 1 August 1925. He was promoted to squadron admiral in 1926 and became a senator of the Kingdom of Italy on 22 December 1928.

Di Ruffia married Maria Voli and was the father of two children, Roberto and Paolo. He left office in 1945 and died in Rome in 1946.

== Awards ==
- Order of Saints Maurice and Lazarus, knight
- Order of the Crown of Italy, knight
- Military Order of Savoy, knight (March 16, 1913)
- Maurician medal
- Cross of Seniority, gold cross
- Gold Medal of Honor for Long Maritime Navigation
- War Merit Cross (3 Awarded)
- Commemorative Medal for the Italo-Turkish War 1911-1912
- Commemorative Medal for the Italo-Austrian War 1915–1918
- Commemorative Medal of the Unity of Italy
- Inter-Allied Medal

=== Foreign Awards ===
- Belgium: Order of Leopold, Grand Officer
- Bulgaria: Order of Saint Alexander, knight and grand cross
- China: Order of the Double Dragon, Knight of the 2nd Degree, 2nd Class
- Denmark: Order of the Dannebrog, knight and grand cross
- France: Legion of Honour, commander
- Germany: Order of the Red Eagle, 2nd Class and knight
- Greece: Order of George I, Grand Cross
- Japan: Order of the Paulownia Flowers, grand cordon
- Japan: Order of the Rising Sun, 1st Class and Knight
- Japan: Order of the Sacred Treasure, 3rd Class and Knight
- Monaco: Order of Saint-Charles, knight and grand cross
- Montenegro: Order of Prince Danilo I, Grand Officer
- Qajar Iran: Order of the Lion and the Sun, knight and great star
- Russia: Order of Saint Anna, 2nd Class and Knight
- United Kingdom: Order of St Michael and St George, knight and commander
- Venezuela: Order of the Liberator, officer
