= Italian submarine Atropo =

Atropo was the name of at least two ships of the Italian Navy and may refer to:

- Italian submarine Atropo (1912), a submarine launched in 1912 and discarded in 1919.
- Italian submarine Atropo (1938), a Foca-class submarine launched in 1938 and discarded in 1947.
