= Italian ship Orione =

Orione has been borne by at least three ships of the Italian Navy and may refer to:

- Italian torpedo boat Orione (1906), an Orione-class torpedo boat launched in 1906 and discarded in 1923.
- Italian torpedo boat Orione (1937), an Orsa-class torpedo boat launched in 1937 and stricken in 1965.
- Italian patrol vessel Orione (P 410), a Sirio-class patrol vessel launched in 2002.
