= Mirabello-class destroyer =

Royal Italian Navy cruiser/destroyer class

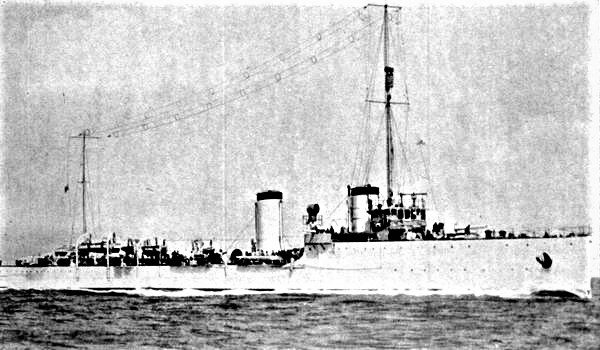

Class overview
- Builders: Ansaldo, Genoa
- Operators: Regia Marina
- Preceded by: Aquila class
- Succeeded by: La Masa class
- Built: 1914–1917
- In commission: 1917–1945
- Planned: 3
- Completed: 3
- Lost: 2
- Scrapped: 1

General characteristics (Carlo Mirabello as built)
- Type: Destroyer
- Displacement: 1,784 t (1,756 long tons) (normal); 2,040 t (2,010 long tons) (deep load)
- Length: 103.75 m (340 ft 5 in)
- Beam: 9.74 m (31 ft 11 in)
- Draught: 3.3 m (10 ft 10 in)
- Installed power: 4 Yarrow boilers; 35,000 shp (26,000 kW)
- Propulsion: 2 shafts; 2 geared steam turbines
- Speed: 35 knots (65 km/h; 40 mph)
- Range: 2,300 nmi (4,300 km; 2,600 mi) at 12 knots (22 km/h; 14 mph)
- Complement: 8 officers and 161 enlisted men
- Armament: 8 × single 102 mm (4 in) guns; 2 × single 76 mm (3 in) AA guns; 2 × twin 450 mm (17.7 in) torpedo tubes; 100 or 120 mines

The Mirabello-class were a group of three destroyers (originally scout cruisers) built for the Regia Marina (Royal Italian Navy) during World War I. Carlo Alberto Racchia was sunk by a mine in the Black Sea during the Allied intervention in the Russian Civil War in 1920. The remaining two ships, obsolescent by 1938, were re-rated as destroyers and participated in World War II. Carlo Mirabello was also lost to a mine while escorting a convoy in 1941. The last surviving ship, Augusto Riboty, was reconfigured as a convoy escort in 1942–1943. The torpedo tubes were removed and depth charges and 20 mm (0.79 in) anti-aircraft guns added. She survived the war and was supposed to be transferred to the Soviet Union as war reparations in 1946, but she was obsolescent so money was accepted instead, and she remained in the italian navy until the early 1950s. The ship was scrapped five years later.

== Design and description ==
The ships were designed as scout cruisers (esploratori), essentially enlarged versions of contemporary destroyers. They had an overall length of 103.75 meters (340 ft 5 in), a beam of 9.74 meters (31 ft 11 in) and a mean draft of 3.3 meters (10 ft 10 in). They displaced 1,784 tonnes (1,756 long tons) at standard load, and 2,040 tonnes (2,010 long tons) at deep load. Their complement was 8 officers and 161 enlisted men.

The Mirabellos were powered by two Parsons geared steam turbines, each driving one propeller shaft using steam supplied by four Yarrow boilers. The turbines were rated at 44,000 shaft horsepower (33,000 kW) for a speed of 35 knots (65 km/h; 40 mph). The ships carried enough fuel oil to give them a range of 2,300 nautical miles (4,300 km; 2,600 mi) at a speed of 12 knots (22 km/h; 14 mph).

Their main battery consisted of eight 35-caliber Cannone da 102 mm (4 in)/35 S Modello 1914 guns in single mounts protected by gun shields, one each fore and aft of the superstructure on the centerline and the remaining guns positioned on the broadside amidships. Carlo Mirabello was the only ship completed to this configuration as her sister ships exchanged a 40-caliber Cannone da 152 mm (6 in)/40 A Modello 1891 for the forward 102 mm gun; Carlo Mirabello received hers in 1917. The gun proved to be too heavy for the ships and its rate of fire was too slow. Anti-aircraft (AA) defense for the Mirabello-class ships was provided by a pair of 40-caliber Cannone da 76 mm (3 in)/40 Modello 1916 AA guns in single mounts. They were equipped with four 450-millimeter (17.7 in) torpedo tubes in two twin mounts, one on each broadside. Augusto Riboty could carry 120 mines, although her sisters could only handle 100.

=== Modifications ===
In 1919 the ships were rearmed with eight 45-caliber Cannone da 102/45 S, A Modello 1917 guns arranged as per Carol Mirabello's original configuration. The 76 mm guns were replaced by a pair of 39-caliber Cannone da 40 mm (1.6 in)/39 AA guns in single mounts in 1920–1922.

== Ships ==
Construction data
| Ship | Laid down | Launched | Completed | Fate |
|---|---|---|---|---|
| Carlo Mirabello | 21 November 1914 | 21 December 1915 | 24 August 1916 | Sunk by mines, 21 May 1941 |
| Carlo Alberto Racchia | 10 December 1914 | 2 June 1916 | 21 December 1916 | Sunk by mines, 21 June 1920 |
| Augusto Riboty | 27 February 1915 | 24 September 1916 | 5 May 1917 | Served in the italian navy until she was scrapped in 1951 |

== Bibliography ==
- Brescia, Maurizio (2012). Mussolini's Navy: A Reference Guide to the Regina Marina 1930–45. Annapolis, Maryland: Naval Institute Press. ISBN 978-1-59114-544-8.
- Campbell, John (1985). Naval Weapons of World War Two. Annapolis, Maryland: Naval Institute Press. ISBN 0-87021-459-4.
- Fraccaroli, Aldo (1970). Italian Warships of World War 1. London: Ian Allan. ISBN 0-7110-0105-7.
- Fraccaroli, Aldo (1968). Italian Warships of World War II. Shepperton, UK: Ian Allan. ISBN 0-7110-0002-6.
- Friedman, Norman (2011). Naval Weapons of World War One: Guns, Torpedoes, Mines and ASW Weapons of All Nations; An Illustrated Directory. Barnsley: Seaforth Publishing. ISBN 978-1-84832-100-7.
- Gray, Randal (1985). Conway's All The World's Fighting Ships 1906–1921. London: Conway Maritime Press. ISBN 0-85177-245-5.
- McMurtrie, Francis E., ed. (1937). Jane's Fighting Ships 1937. London: Sampson Low. OCLC 927896922.
- Roberts, John (1980). "Italy". In Chesneau, Roger (ed.). Conway's All the World's Fighting Ships 1922–1946. New York: Mayflower Books. pp. 280–317. ISBN 0-8317-0303-2.
- Rohwer, Jürgen (2005). Chronology of the War at Sea 1939–1945: The Naval History of World War Two (Third Revised ed.). Annapolis, Maryland: Naval Institute Press. ISBN 1-59114-119-2.
- Whitley, M. J. (1988). Destroyers of World War 2: An International Encyclopedia. Annapolis, Maryland: Naval Institute Press. ISBN 1-85409-521-8.
