= Italian ship Sirio =

Sirio has been borne by at least three ships of the Italian Navy and may refer to:

- Italian torpedo boat Sirio (1905), a Sirio-class torpedo boat launched in 1905 and discarded in 1923.
- Italian torpedo boat Sirio (1935), a Spica-class torpedo boat launched in 1935 and stricken in 1959.
- Italian patrol vessel Sirio (P 409), a Sirio-class patrol vessel launched in 2002.
