= Carlo Biscaretti di Ruffia =

Italian artist, designer, and journalist

Conte Carlo Biscaretti di Ruffia (24 August 1879 – 7 September 1959) was an Italian artist, industrial designer and journalist. He was the founder of the National Automobile Museum.

== Life ==
He was born on 24 August 1879 in Turin. He was the son of Roberto Biscaretti di Ruffia, a senator who was involved in the establishment of Fiat (1899). As a youngster, Carlo assisted in the first Italian automobile race (Turin-Asti-Turin, 1896). In 1898, he started the "Automobile Club di Torino" (Automobile Club of Turin) (he was president until 1948), which then became the Automobile Club d'Italia. He also took part in the first Giro d'Italia automobilistico (1901).

Biscaretti di Ruffia got a law degree (1904) and worked a while in Genoa for "Filiale di Fabbre e Gagliardi", a bicycle accessory shop, before moving to Rome to run the offices of Carrozzeria Alessio. Back in his hometown, he established the "Studio Tecnico Carlo Biscaretti" in via della Rocca 22, Turin. He was involved in the early Itala 51 vehicles (illustrations), for Michelin and contributed to several motor journals.

He was also involved in the Turin Auto Show. He collected vehicles since 1933 and he founded the Museo Nazionale dell'Automobile "Carlo Biscaretti di Ruffia", which was opened in 1960 after his death.

He died on 7 September 1959 in Ripafratta, San Giuliano Terme.

== Lancia logo ==
In February 1899, Vincenzo Lancia was sent to help Carlo Biscaretti di Ruffia, who owned a defective Benz and they quickly became friends. Biscaretti di Ruffia was due to become important in Lancia's history and is credited for designing the Lancia logo with the blue flag in 1911.
