= List of torpedo boats of World War II =

This is a list of torpedo boats of the Second World War, not to be confused with smaller motor torpedo boats.

The List of ships of the Second World War contains major military vessels of the war, arranged alphabetically and by type. The list includes armed vessels that served during the war and in the immediate aftermath, inclusive of localized ongoing combat operations, garrison surrenders, post-surrender occupation, colony re-occupation, troop and prisoner repatriation, to the end of 1945.

For smaller vessels, see also list of World War II ships of less than 1000 tons. Some uncompleted Axis ships are included, out of historic interest. Ships are designated to the country under which they operated for the longest period of the Second World War, regardless of where they were built or previous service history.

List of torpedo boats of World War II
Ship	Operator	Class	Displacement (tons)	First commissioned	Fate
Airone	Regia Marina	Spica	795	10 May 1938	sunk 12 October 1940
Albatros	Kriegsmarine	Type 1923 ("Raubvogel")	923	15 May 1927	constructive total loss 10 April 1940
Albatros	Regia Marina		329	10 November 1934	sunk 27 September 1941
Alcione	Regia Marina	Spica	795	10 May 1938	sunk 11 December 1941
Aldebaran	Regia Marina	Spica	795	6 December 1936	sunk 20 October 1941
Aliseo	Regia Marina	Ciclone	910	20 September 1942	war reparation to Yugoslavia as Triglav 24 April 1949
Altair	Regia Marina	Spica	795	23 December 1936	sunk 20 October 1941
Andromeda	Regia Marina	Spica	795	6 December 1936	sunk 17 March 1941
Angelo Bassini	Regia Marina	La Masa	785	1 May 1918	sunk 28 May 1943
Animoso	Regia Marina	Ciclone	910	15 April 1942	war reparation to Soviet Union as Ladny 1949, broken up 1958
Antares	Regia Marina	Spica	795	23 December 1936	sunk 28 March 1943
Antonio Mosto	Regia Marina	Rosolino Pilo	770	7 July 1915	stricken 15 December 1958
Ardente	Regia Marina	Ciclone	910	27 May 1942	sunk in collision with the destroyer Grecale 12 January 1943
Ardimentoso	Regia Marina	Ciclone	910	27 June 1942	war reparation to Soviet Union Liuty 1949, broken up 1960
Ardito	Regia Marina; Kriegsmarine	Ciclone	910	16 March 1942	captured by Germany as TA26 September 1943, either sunk 15 June 1944 by US Navy PT boats or destroyed by sabotage 6 July 1944
Aretusa	Regia Marina	Spica	795	1 July 1938	decommissioned 1 August 1958
Ariel	Regia Marina	Spica	795	1 July 1938	sunk 12 October 1940
Ariete	Regia Marina	Ariete	745	5 August 1943	war reparation to Yugoslavia as Durmitor 30 April 1949, stricken 1 January 1967
Audace	Regia Marina; Kriegsmarine	Urakaze	907	1 March 1917	captured by Germany as TA20 12 September 1943, sunk 2 November 1944
Ave	Portuguese Navy	250t (F-group)	262	23 May 1916	scrapped 1940
Balestra	Regia Marina; Kriegsmarine	Ariete	745	1949	laid down 9 May 1942, captured unfinished by Germany as TA47 September 1943, completed for Yugoslavia as Učka 1949, scrapped 1971
Baliste	French Navy; Regia Marina; Kriegsmarine	La Melpomène	610	14 May 1938	scuttled 27 November 1942, captured and refloated by Italy as FR45, captured by Germany as TA12 September 1943, sunk 22 August 1943
Bombarde	French Navy; Regia Marina; Kriegsmarine	La Melpomène	610	1 August 1938	seized by Italy as FR41 November 1942, captured by Germany as TA9 September 1943, sunk 23 August 1944
Bouclier	French Navy; Royal Netherlands Navy; Free French Naval Forces	La Melpomène	610	6 August 1938	seized by United Kingdom 3 July 1940 and transferred to Netherlands as HNLMS Bouclier, later transferred to Free France January 1941, sold for scrap 1950
Brand	Royal Norwegian Navy; Kriegsmarine	1.	107	22 September 1898	captured by Germany 16 April 1940, later renamed as Tarantel, returned to Norway 1945, scrapped 1946
Branlebas	French Navy; Royal Navy	La Melpomène	610	10 March 1938	seized by United Kingdom 3 July 1940, foundered 14 December 1940
Calatafimi	Regia Marina; Kriegsmarine	Curtatone	876	24 May 1924	captured by Germany as TA19 9 September 1943, sunk 19 August 1944
Calipso	Regia Marina	Spica	795	16 November 1938	sunk 5 December 1940
Calliope	Regia Marina	Spica	795	28 October 1938	decommissioned 1 August 1958
Canopo	Regia Marina	Spica	795	31 March 1937	sunk 3 May 1941
Cassiopea	Regia Marina	Spica	795	26 April 1937	decommissioned 1959
Castelfidardo	Regia Marina; Kriegsmarine	Curtatone	876	7 March 1924	captured by Germany as TA16 9 September 1943, sunk 2 June 1944
Castore	Regia Marina	Spica	795	16 January 1937	sunk 2 June 1943
Centauro	Regia Marina	Spica	795	16 June 1936	sunk 4 November 1942
Chidori	Imperial Japanese Navy	Chidori	600	20 November 1933	sunk 21 December 1944
Christiaan Cornelis	Royal Netherlands Navy	K	47.9	28 December 1905	scuttled 13 May 1940
Ciclone	Regia Marina	Ciclone	910	1 March 1942	sunk by mines 8 March 1943
Cigno	Regia Marina	Spica	795	15 March 1937	sunk 16 April 1943
Circe	Regia Marina	Spica	795	4 October 1938	sunk 27 November 1942
Claus von Bevern	Kriegsmarine	S138	640	5 August 1911	to United States post-war, scuttled 1946
Climene	Regia Marina	Spica	795	24 April 1936	sunk 28 April 1943
Clio	Regia Marina	Spica	795	2 October 1938	decommissioned 1959
Confienza	Regia Marina	Palestro	875	25 April 1923	sunk 20 November 1940
Curtatone	Regia Marina	Curtatone	876	21 June 1923	sunk 20 May 1941
Drazki	Bulgarian Navy	Drazki	97	1907	to Soviet Union as Ingul 9 September 1944, returned to Bulgaria July 1945, partially scrapped 1957, parts of the ship were installed aboard Strogi to be preserved as museum ship 21 November 1957
Enrico Cosenz	Regia Marina	La Masa	785	13 June 1919	scuttled in the Adriatic near Lastovo 27 September 1943
Falke	Kriegsmarine	Type 1923 ("Raubvogel")	923	15 July 1928	sunk 15 June 1944
Fionda	Regia Marina; Kriegsmarine	Ariete	745	Never commissioned	laid down 27 July 1942, captured by Germany as TA46 September 1943, lost 20 February 1945 while under construction, scrapped 1947
Fortunale	Regia Marina	Ciclone	910	18 April 1942	war reparation to Soviet Union Liotny 1949, sunk as target 1959
Francesco Stocco	Regia Marina	Giuseppe Sirtori	698	19 July 1917	sunk 24 September 1943
Fratelli Cairoli	Regia Marina	Rosolino Pilo	770	1 May 1915	sunk by mine off Libya 23 September 1940
Generale Achille Papa	Regia Marina; Kriegsmarine	Generali	832	9 February 1922	captured by Germany as SG 20 18 October 1943, sunk 25 April 1945
Generale Antonio Cantore	Regia Marina	Generali	832	1 July 1921	sunk by a mine off Ras el Tin Libya 22 August 1942
Generale Antonio Cascino	Regia Marina	Generali	832	8 May 1922	scuttled 9 September 1943
Generale Antonio Chinotto	Regia Marina	Generali	832	26 September 1921	sunk by mines off Palermo 28 March 1941
Generale Carlo Montanari	Regia Marina	Generali	832	9 November 1922	scuttled 25 April 1944, refloated and scrapped 1949
Generale Marcello Prestinari	Regia Marina	Generali	832	17 August 1922	sunk by a mine near Sicily 31 January 1943
Ghibli	Regia Marina	Ciclone	910	28 February 1943	scuttled in La Spezia 25 April 1945
Giacinto Carini	Regia Marina	La Masa	785	30 November 1917	stricken December 1958
Giacomo Medici	Regia Marina	La Masa	785	13 September 1919	Sunk in Catania on 16 April 1943 by an American air raid
Giovanni Acerbi	Regia Marina	Giuseppe Sirtori	698	26 February 1917	sunk 4 April 1941
Giuseppe Cesare Abba	Regia Marina	Rosolino Pilo	770	6 July 1915	stricken 1 September 1958
Giuseppe Dezza	Regia Marina; Kriegsmarine	Rosolino Pilo	770	1 January 1916	scuttled 16 September 1943, refloated by Germany as TA35, sunk by mine 17 August 1944, refloated again and scuttled 3 May 1945
Giuseppe La Farina	Regia Marina	La Masa	785	18 March 1919	sunk 4 May 1941 after hitting a mine off the Tunisian coast
Giuseppe La Masa	Regia Marina	La Masa	785	28 September 1917	scuttled 11 September 1943
Giuseppe Missori	Regia Marina; Kriegsmarine	Rosolino Pilo	770	7 March 1916	captured by Germany as TA22 10 September 1943, scuttled 3 May 1945
Giuseppe Sirtori	Regia Marina	Giuseppe Sirtori	698	22 December 1916	scuttled 25 September 1943
Greif	Kriegsmarine	Type 1923 ("Raubvogel")	923	15 July 1927	sunk 23 May 1944
Groppo	Regia Marina	Ciclone	910	19 April 1943	sunk 25 May 1943
Hatsukari	Imperial Japanese Navy	Chidori	600	15 July 1934	seized by United Kingdom at the end of the war, decommissioned 3 May 1947, scrapped 1948
Hato	Imperial Japanese Navy	Ōtori	840	7 August 1937	sunk 16 October 1944
Hayabusa	Imperial Japanese Navy	Ōtori	840	7 December 1936	sunk 24 September 1944
Hiyodori	Imperial Japanese Navy	Ōtori	840	20 December 1936	sunk 17 November 1944
Iltis	Kriegsmarine	Type 1924 ("Raubtier")	932	1 October 1928	sunk 13 May 1942
Impavido	Regia Marina; Kriegsmarine	Ciclone	910	24 February 1943	captured by Germany as TA23 September 1943, struck a mine 25 April 1944
Impetuoso	Regia Marina	Ciclone	910	20 April 1943	scuttled 11 September 1943
Indomito	Regia Marina	Ciclone	910	6 July 1943	war reparation to Yugoslavia as Biokovo 1949
Intrepido	Regia Marina; Kriegsmarine	Ciclone	910	8 September 1943	captured by Germany as TA25 September 1943, sunk 15 July 1944
Jaguar	Kriegsmarine	Type 1924 ("Raubtier")	932	15 August 1929	sunk 14 June 1944
Kari	Imperial Japanese Navy	Ōtori	840	20 September 1937	sunk 16 July 1945
Kasasagi	Imperial Japanese Navy	Ōtori	840	15 January 1937	sunk 26 September 1943
Khrabri	Bulgarian Navy	Drazki	97	1907	to Soviet Union as Vychegda 9 September 1944, returned to Bulgaria July 1945, stricken 1954, scrapped 1962
Kiji	Imperial Japanese Navy	Ōtori	840	31 July 1937	to Soviet Union as Vnimatelny 3 October 1947, decommissioned 31 October 1957
Kios	Royal Hellenic Navy	250t (M-group)	270	29 October 1915	scuttled 22 April 1941
Kjell	Royal Norwegian Navy; Kriegsmarine	2.	84	12 March 1912	captured by Germany as KT1 11 April 1940, later renamed as Dragoner, sunk 28 September 1944
Kondor	Kriegsmarine	Type 1923 ("Raubvogel")	923	15 July 1928	constructive total loss 31 July or 2 August 1944
Kydoniai	Royal Hellenic Navy	250t (M-group)	270	13 March 1916	sunk 26 April 1941
Kyzikos	Royal Hellenic Navy	250t (M-group)	270	19 August 1915	scuttled 25 April 1941
L'Agile	French Navy; Kriegsmarine	Le Fier	1,010	Never commissioned	launched 23 May 1940, captured by Germany as TA2 22 June 1940, sunk 11 August 1944
L'Alsacien	French Navy; Kriegsmarine	Le Fier	1,010	Never commissioned	launched 1942, captured by Germany as TA3 22 June 1940, destroyed March 1944
L'Entreprenant	French Navy; Kriegsmarine	Le Fier	1,010	Never commissioned	launched 25 May 1940, captured by Germany as TA4 22 June 1940, sunk 11 August 1944
L'Incomprise	French Navy; Royal Navy; Free French Naval Forces	La Melpomène	610	12 March 1938	seized by United Kingdom after the Fall of France and used briefly, later transferred to Free France, sold for scrap 1950
L'Iphigénie	French Navy; Regia Marina; Kriegsmarine	La Melpomène	610	21 November 1936	seized by Italy as FR43 November 1942, captured by Germany as TA11 May 1943, sunk 10 September 1943
La Bayonnaise	French Navy; Regia Marina; Kriegsmarine	La Melpomène	610	7 April 1938	scuttled 27 November 1942, captured and refloated by Italy as FR44, captured by Germany as TA13 September 1943, scuttled 23 August 1944
La Cordelière	French Navy; Royal Navy; Free French Naval Forces	La Melpomène	610	11 November 1937	seized by United Kingdom 3 July 1940 and used briefly, later transferred to Free France, sold for scrap 1950
La Flore	French Navy; Royal Navy; Free French Naval Forces	La Melpomène	610	17 November 1936	seized by United Kingdom after the Fall of France and used briefly, later transferred to Free France, sold for scrap 1950
La Melpomène	French Navy; Royal Navy; Free French Naval Forces	La Melpomène	610	12 November 1936	seized by United Kingdom after the Fall of France and used briefly, later transferred to Free France, sold for scrap 1950
La Pomone	French Navy; Regia Marina; Kriegsmarine	La Melpomène	610	6 December 1936	seized by Italy as FR42 November 1942, captured by Germany as TA10 May 1943, scuttled 27 September 1943
La Poursuivante	French Navy	La Melpomène	610	10 November 1937	scuttled 27 November 1942
Le Breton	French Navy	Le Fier	1,010	Never commissioned	laid down January 1940, captured by Germany 22 June 1940 and later scrapped
Le Corse	French Navy; Kriegsmarine	Le Fier	1,010	Never commissioned	launched 4 April 1942, captured by Germany as TA6 22 June 1940, sunk 11 August 1944
Le Farouche	French Navy; Kriegsmarine	Le Fier	1,010	Never commissioned	launched 19 October 1940, sunk 22 June 1940, refloated and captured by Germany as TA5, scuttled 11 August 1944
Le Fier	French Navy; Kriegsmarine	Le Fier	1,010	Never commissioned	launched 12 March 1940, sunk 22 June 1940, refloated and captured by Germany as TA1, scuttled 11 August 1944
Leopard	Kriegsmarine	Type 1924 ("Raubtier")	932	15 April 1929	sunk by collision 30 April 1940
Libra	Regia Marina	Spica	795	19 January 1939	decommissioned 1964
Lince	Regia Marina	Spica	795	1 April 1938	destroyed 28 August 1943
Lira	Regia Marina; Kriegsmarine	Spica	795	1 January 1938	scuttled 9 September 1943, refloated by Germany as TA49, sunk 4 November 1944
Luchs	Kriegsmarine	Type 1924 ("Raubtier")	932	15 April 1929	sunk 26 July 1940
Lupo	Regia Marina	Spica	795	28 February 1938	sunk 2 December 1942
Manazuru	Imperial Japanese Navy	Chidori	600	31 January 1934	sunk 1 March 1945
Mazur	Polish Navy	V105	330	23 March 1915	sunk 1 September 1939
Monsone	Regia Marina	Ciclone	910	7 June 1942	sunk 1 March 1943
Monzambano	Regia Marina	Curtatone	876	4 June 1923	decommissioned April 1951
Möwe	Kriegsmarine	Type 1923 ("Raubvogel")	798	1 October 1926	sunk 16 June 1944
Năluca	Royal Romanian Navy	250t (F-group)	266	16 August 1916	sunk 20 August 1944
Nicola Fabrizi	Regia Marina	La Masa	785	12 July 1918	stricken February 1957
Orione	Regia Marina	Orsa	840	31 March 1938	decommissioned 1 January 1965
Orsa	Regia Marina	Orsa	840	30 March 1938	decommissioned 1 July 1964
Ōtori	Imperial Japanese Navy	Ōtori	840	10 October 1936	sunk 12 June 1944
Palestro	Regia Marina	Palestro	875	26 January 1921	sunk 22 September 1940
Pallade	Regia Marina	Spica	795	5 October 1938	sunk 5 August 1942
Partenope	Regia Marina	Spica	795	26 November 1938	scuttled 11 September 1943
Pegaso	Regia Marina	Orsa	840	31 March 1938	scuttled 11 September 1943
Pergamos	Royal Hellenic Navy	250t (F-group)	243	27 September 1916	scuttled 25 April 1941
Perseo	Regia Marina	Spica	795	1 February 1936	sunk 4 May 1943
Pleiadi	Regia Marina	Spica	795	4 July 1938	sunk 14 October 1941
Polluce	Regia Marina	Spica	795	8 August 1938	sunk 4 September 1942
Procione	Regia Marina	Orsa	840	31 March 1938	scuttled 11 September 1943
Proussa	Royal Hellenic Navy	250t (F-group)	243	17 June 1916	sunk 4 April 1941
Rosolino Pilo	Regia Marina	Rosolino Pilo	770	25 May 1915	stricken October 1954
Sado	Portuguese Navy	250t (F-group)	262	1 March 1916	scrapped 1940
Sagi	Imperial Japanese Navy	Ōtori	840	31 July 1937	sunk 8 November 1944
Sagittario	Regia Marina	Spica	795	8 October 1936	decommissioned 1964
San Martino	Regia Marina; Kriegsmarine	Palestro	875	10 October 1922	captured by Germany 9 September 1943, commissioned as TA17 28 October 1943, scuttled 12 October 1944
Sæl	Royal Norwegian Navy	1.	107	25 September 1901	sunk 18 April 1940
Sborul	Royal Romanian Navy	250t (T-group)	262	1 December 1914	to Soviet Union as Musson 1944, returned to Romania 22 September 1945, scrapped 1958
Seeadler	Kriegsmarine	Type 1923 ("Raubvogel")	923	15 March 1927	sunk 14 May 1942
Simone Schiaffino	Regia Marina	Rosolino Pilo	770	7 November 1915	sunk by an Italian mine off Cap Bon 24 April 1941
Sirio	Regia Marina	Spica	795	1 March 1936	decommissioned 1959
Smeli	Bulgarian Navy	Drazki	97	1907	sunk 19 May 1943
Smeul	Royal Romanian Navy	250t (F-group)	266	7 August 1915	to Soviet Union as Toros 1944, returned to Romania October 1945, scrapped 1960
Snøgg	Royal Norwegian Navy; Kriegsmarine	Trygg	256	2 September 1920	captured by Germany 5 May 1940, later renamed as Zack, sunk 6 September 1943
Solferino	Regia Marina; Kriegsmarine	Palestro	875	31 October 1921	captured by Germany 9 September 1943, commissioned as TA18 25 July 1944, destroyed 19 October 1944
Stegg	Royal Norwegian Navy	Trygg	256	16 June 1921	destroyed 20 April 1940, formally stricken and sold for scrap 24 June 1949
Storm	Royal Norwegian Navy	1.	107	1 June 1898	sunk 13 April 1940
Strogi	Bulgarian Navy	Drazki	97	1908	to Soviet Union as 9 September 1944, returned to Bulgaria July 1945, parts of Drazki were installed aboard the ship's hull to be preserved as museum ship Drazki 21 November 1957
Sulev	Estonian Navy; Soviet Navy	A26	223	October 1916	to Soviet Union as Ametist October 1940, scrapped 1950
T1	Royal Yugoslav Navy; Regia Marina	250t (T-group)	258	20 July 1914	captured by Italy April 1941, returned to Yugoslavia December 1943, renamed as Golešnica post-war, struck October 1959
T2	Royal Yugoslav Navy	250t (T-group)	258	11 August 1914	scrapped 1939
T3	Royal Yugoslav Navy; Regia Marina; Kriegsmarine	250t (T-group)	258	23 August 1914	captured by Italy April 1941, captured by Germany September 1943, commissioned as TA48 15 August 1944, sunk 20 February 1945
T5	Royal Yugoslav Navy; Regia Marina	250t (F-group)	262	25 October 1915	captured by Italy April 1941, returned to Yugoslavia December 1943, renamed as Cer post-war, scrapped 1962
T6	Royal Yugoslav Navy; Regia Marina	250t (F-group)	262	16 April 1916	captured by Italy April 1941, scuttled 11 September 1943
T7	Royal Yugoslav Navy; Regia Marina; Navy of the Independent State of Croatia	250t (F-group)	262	23 November 1916	captured by Italy April 1941, to Croatia September 1943, destroyed 24 June 1944
T8	Royal Yugoslav Navy; Regia Marina	250t (F-group)	262	22 December 1916	captured by Italy April 1941, sunk 11 September 1943
T1	Kriegsmarine	Type 1935	845	1 December 1939	sunk 10 April 1945
T2	Kriegsmarine	Type 1935	845	2 December 1939	sunk 29 July 1944
T3	Kriegsmarine	Type 1935	845	3 February 1940	sunk 14 March 1945
T4	Kriegsmarine	Type 1935	845	27 May 1940	ceded to United States late 1945, sold to Denmark 18 June 1948, scrapped 1950-1951
T5	Kriegsmarine	Type 1935	845	23 January 1940	sunk 14 March 1945
T6	Kriegsmarine	Type 1935	845	30 April 1940	sunk 7 November 1940
T7	Kriegsmarine	Type 1935	845	20 December 1939	sunk 29 July 1944
T8	Kriegsmarine	Type 1935	845	8 October 1939	sunk 3 May 1945
T9	Kriegsmarine	Type 1935	845	4 July 1940	sunk 3 May 1945
T10	Kriegsmarine	Type 1935	845	5 August 1940	sunk 19 December 1944
T11	Kriegsmarine	Type 1935	845	24 May 1940	ceded to United Kingdom late 1945, to France as Bir Hacheim 4 February 1946, stricken 8 October 1951
T12	Kriegsmarine	Type 1935	845	3 July 1940	ceded to Soviet Union as Podvizhny 5 November 1945, sunk after nuclear testing early 1959
T13	Kriegsmarine	Type 1937	874	31 May 1941	sunk 10 April 1945
T14	Kriegsmarine	Type 1937	874	14 June 1941	to France as Dompaire 24 October 1947, stricken 8 October 1951
T15	Kriegsmarine	Type 1937	874	26 June 1941	sunk 13 December 1943
T16	Kriegsmarine	Type 1937	874	24 July 1941	scrapped September 1946
T17	Kriegsmarine	Type 1937	874	18 August 1941	ceded to Soviet Union as Poryvisty 5 November 1945, stricken 30 December 1959
T18	Kriegsmarine	Type 1937	874	22 November 1941	sunk 17 September 1944
T19	Kriegsmarine	Type 1937	874	18 December 1941	ceded to United States late 1945, sold to Denmark 1947, scrapped 1950-1951
T20	Kriegsmarine	Type 1937	874	5 June 1942	to France as Baccarat 4 February 1947, stricken 8 October 1951
T21	Kriegsmarine	Type 1937	874	11 July 1942	ceded to United States late 1945, scuttled 1946
T22	Kriegsmarine	Type 1939	1,274	28 February 1942	sunk 18 August 1944
T23	Kriegsmarine	Type 1939	1,274	14 June 1942	ceded to France as L'Alsacien 4 February 1946, sold for scrap 9 June 1954
T24	Kriegsmarine	Type 1939	1,274	17 October 1942	sunk 24 August 1944
T25	Kriegsmarine	Type 1939	1,274	12 November 1942	sunk 28 December 1943
T26	Kriegsmarine	Type 1939	1,274	28 February 1943	sunk 28 December 1943
T27	Kriegsmarine	Type 1939	1,274	17 April 1943	destroyed 6 May 1944
T28	Kriegsmarine	Type 1939	1,274	19 June 1943	ceded to France as Le Lorrain 4 February 1946, sold for scrap 31 October 1955
T29	Kriegsmarine	Type 1939	1,274	21 August 1943	sunk 26 April 1944
T30	Kriegsmarine	Type 1939	1,274	24 October 1943	sunk 18 August 1944
T31	Kriegsmarine	Type 1939	1,274	5 February 1944	sunk 20 June 1944
T32	Kriegsmarine	Type 1939	1,274	8 May 1944	sunk 18 August 1944
T33	Kriegsmarine	Type 1939	1,274	16 June 1944	ceded to Soviet Union as Primerny 1 January 1946, sold for scrap 9 November 1956
T34	Kriegsmarine	Type 1939	1,274	12 August 1944	sunk 20 November 1944
T35	Kriegsmarine	Type 1939	1,274	7 October 1944	ceded to United States as DD-935 1946, to France as spare parts 1947, stricken 3 October 1952
T36	Kriegsmarine	Type 1939	1,274	9 December 1944	sunk 5 May 1945
T37	Kriegsmarine	Type 1941	1,493	Never commissioned	launched February–April 1944, scuttled 1946
T38	Kriegsmarine	Type 1941	1,493	Never commissioned	launched April–June 1944, scuttled 10 May 1946
T39	Kriegsmarine	Type 1941	1,493	Never commissioned	launched April–June 1944, scuttled 10 May 1946
T40	Kriegsmarine	Type 1941	1,493	Never commissioned	launched August–October 1944, ran aground 12 March 1945 and later scuttled
T41	Kriegsmarine	Type 1941	1,493	Never commissioned	laid down October 1943–February 1944, demolished on the slipway March 1945
T42	Kriegsmarine	Type 1941	1,493	Never commissioned	laid down October 1943–February 1944, demolished on the slipway March 1945
T43	Kriegsmarine	Type 1941	1,493	Never commissioned	laid down February–June 1944, demolished on the slipway March 1945
T44	Kriegsmarine	Type 1941	1,493	Never commissioned	laid down February–June 1944, demolished on the slipway March 1945
T45	Kriegsmarine	Type 1941	1,493	Never commissioned	laid down February–June 1944, demolished on the slipway March 1945
T61	Kriegsmarine	Type 1940	1,931	Never commissioned	launched 15 August 1944, sunk 12 September 1944
T62	Kriegsmarine	Type 1940	1,274	Never commissioned	laid down 1 April 1942, demolished on the slipway 1945–1946
T63	Kriegsmarine	Type 1940	1,274	Never commissioned	launched 28 October 1944, scuttled 31 December 1946
T64	Kriegsmarine	Type 1940	1,274	Never commissioned	laid down 1 April 1942, demolished on the slipway 1945–1946
T65	Kriegsmarine	Type 1940	1,274	Never commissioned	launched 8 July 1944, scuttled 2 July 1946
T66	Kriegsmarine	Type 1940	1,274	Never commissioned	launched 29 July 1944, possibly destroyed in an air raid 1944
T67	Kriegsmarine	Type 1940	1,274	Never commissioned	laid down 23 November 1943, damaged by bombing 19 October 1944, wreck demolished November–December 1945
T70	Kriegsmarine	Type 1940	1,274	Never commissioned	laid down 1 April 1942, demolished on the slipway 1945–1946
T107	Kriegsmarine	V1	564	30 April 1912	to Soviet Union post-war as Porazhayushchiy, struck 12 March 1957 and scrapped
T108	Kriegsmarine	V1	564	6 August 1912	to United Kingdom 6 January 1946, scrapped
T110	Kriegsmarine	V1	564	28 August 1912	scuttled 5 May 1945
T111	Kriegsmarine	V1	564	8 August 1912	bombed 3 April 1945, scuttled 14 December 1945
T151	Kriegsmarine	S138	640	29 February 1908	scrapped 1948
T153	Kriegsmarine	S138	640	9 May 1908	scrapped 1949
T155	Kriegsmarine	S138	640	25 June 1908	scuttled 22 April 1945
T156	Kriegsmarine	S138	640	21 July 1908	scuttled 3 May 1945
T157	Kriegsmarine	S138	640	27 August 1908	sunk 22 October 1943
T158	Kriegsmarine	S138	640	8 October 1908	scrapped 1950
T196	Kriegsmarine	S138	640	2 October 1911	to Soviet Union as Pronzitelny 27 December 1945, struck 30 April 1949 and scrapped
TA24	Kriegsmarine	Ariete	745	4 October 1943	sunk 18 March 1945
TA27	Kriegsmarine	Ariete	745	28 December 1943	sunk 9 June 1944
TA28	Kriegsmarine	Ariete	745	January 1944	sunk 4 September 1944
TA29	Kriegsmarine	Ariete	745	March 1944	sunk 18 March 1945
TA30	Kriegsmarine	Ariete	745	May 1944	sunk 15 June 1944
TA36	Kriegsmarine	Ariete	745	January 1944	sunk 18 March 1944
TA37	Kriegsmarine	Ariete	745	8 January 1944	sunk 7 October 1944
TA38	Kriegsmarine	Ariete	745	February 1944	sunk 13 October 1944
TA39	Kriegsmarine	Ariete	745	March 1944	sunk 16 October 1944
TA40	Kriegsmarine	Ariete	745	October 1944	scuttled 4 May 1945
TA41	Kriegsmarine	Ariete	745	September 1944	sunk 17 February 1945
TA42	Kriegsmarine	Ariete	745	27 September 1944	sunk 21 March 1945
TA45	Kriegsmarine	Ariete	745	September 1944	sunk 13 April 1945
Tifone	Regia Marina	Ciclone	910	31 March 1942	scuttled at Korbous, Tunisia 7 May 1943
Tiger	Kriegsmarine	Type 1924 ("Raubtier")	932	15 January 1929	sunk in a collision 27 August 1939
Tomozuru	Imperial Japanese Navy	Chidori	600	24 February 1934	sunk 24 March 1945
Trygg	Royal Norwegian Navy; Kriegsmarine	Trygg	256	31 May 1919	sunk 25 April 1940, captured and refloated by Germany as Zick late 1940, sunk 23 October 1944
Uragano	Regia Marina	Ciclone	910	3 May 1942	sunk by mines 3 February 1943
Vega	Regia Marina	Spica	795	12 October 1936	sunk 10 January 1941
Vincenzo Giordano Orsini	Regia Marina	Giuseppe Sirtori	698	12 May 1917	scuttled 8 April 1941
Wielingen	Belgian Navy	A26	223	April 1917	captured by Germany 18 May 1940, scrapped 1943
Wolf	Kriegsmarine	Type 1924 ("Raubtier")	932	15 November 1928	sunk 8 January 1941
Z 3	Royal Netherlands Navy	Z 1	273	21 August 1920	scuttled 14 May 1940, refloated and scrapped 1941
Z 5	Royal Netherlands Navy; Royal Navy	Z 5	259	8 February 1917	to United Kingdom as HMS Z 5 2 March 1942, renamed as HMS Blade May 1943, returned to the Netherlands and stricken 9 April 1945, scrapped 23 October 1945
Z 6	Royal Netherlands Navy	Z 5	259	8 February 1917	decommissioned 4 October 1940, sold for scrap March 1942
Z 7	Royal Netherlands Navy; Royal Navy	Z 5	259	8 September 1916	decommissioned 16 July 1942, to United Kingdom as HMS Z 7 1 October 1942, decommissioned January 1944, scrapped 1947
Z 8	Royal Netherlands Navy; Royal Navy	Z 5	259	22 September 1916	to United Kingdom as HMS Z 8 1 October 1942, decommissioned January 1944, scrapped August 1944
