= Torpedoboot Ausland =

Small destroyers or large torpedo boats captured by Nazi Germany

The Torpedoboot Ausland ("foreign torpedo boats") were small destroyers or large torpedo boats captured by Nazi Germany and incorporated into the Kriegsmarine. They were assigned a number beginning with TA.

== Ex-French ships ==
- Former French Le Fier-class torpedo boats, under construction in France. None were completed for the Germans.

- TA1 (ex Le Fier): Scuttled while incomplete August 1944
- TA2 (ex L'Agile): Scuttled while incomplete August 1944
- TA3 (ex L'Alsacien): Broken up 1944
- TA4 (ex L'Entreprenant): Broken up 1944
- TA5 (ex Le Farouche): Scuttled while incomplete August 1944
- TA6 (ex Le Corse): Scuttled while incomplete August 1944

- Former French La Melpomène-class torpedo boats taken over in April 1943

- TA9 (ex Bombarde) sunk by air raid 23 August 1944 in the Tyrrhenian Sea
- TA10 (ex La Pomone) heavily damaged by HMS Eclipse off Lindos on 23 September 1943, later scuttled at Rhodes
- TA11 (ex L'Iphigénie) sunk by Italian MAS boats at Piombino on 11 September 1943
- TA12 (ex Baliste) not used by the Germans because of poor material condition
- TA13 (ex La Bayonnaise) not used by the Germans because of poor material condition

== Ex-Norwegian ships ==
- Former Royal Norwegian Navy Aalesund-class destroyers, (also referred to as "Improved Sleipnir destroyers) captured during the German invasion of Norway in 1940, while still under construction and yet to be named. Taken over and designated ZN (Zerstörer Norwegen) 4 & 5, they were reclassified as torpedo boats in 1941.

- TA7 (ex-ZN-4): Launched but not completed due to sabotage by the Norwegian resistance movement
- TA8 (ex-ZN-5): Launched but not completed

- Four other vessels, (of the Sleipner-class torpedo boats/destroyers) were also taken over, but were named for past German gunboats and not included in the TA class.
- One more ex-Norwegian small destroyer, Troll, was also captured and served in the Kriegsmarine as torpedo boat for a brief time before being converted to a distillation vessel to provide steam, retaining her Norwegian name. The conversion was due to her obsolete nature.

== Ex-Italian ships ==
- TA7 II: (ex-Generale Achille Papa, Italian Generali-class destroyer), captured in Genoa on 09.09.1943. Served as TA7 on 17.10.1943 for one day, then became the fast escort SG20 on the next. As SG20 it was sunk on 06.01.1944 after an air raid.
- TA14: (ex-Turbine, Italian Turbine-class destroyer), captured in Piraeus, September 1943. Served in the Aegean Sea and sunk by US Army Air Force in Salamis on 16 September 1944.
- TA15: (ex-Francesco Crispi, Italian Sella-class destroyer), Captured in the Aegean in September 1943. Sunk by air raid near Heraklion on 8 March 1944. 34 men were killed.
- TA16: (ex-Castelfidardo, Italian Curtatone-class destroyer), captured in the Aegean Sea, September 1943. Sunk at Heraklion after damage by RAF air raid
- TA17: (ex-San Martino, Italian Palestro-class destroyer) captured in Piraeus 9 September 1943. Operated in the Aegean, Scuttled 12 October 1944 after damage in an air raid on Salamis.
- TA18: (ex-Solferino, Italian Palestro-class destroyer), captured in Piraeus 9 September 1943. Operated in the Aegean, sunk by British destroyers HMS Tuscan and HMS Termagant 19 October 1944.
- TA19: (ex-Calatafimi, Italian Curtatone-class destroyer), captured in the Aegean Sea, September 1943. Sunk by Greek submarine Pipinos on 9 August 1944.
- TA20: ex-Audace, Italian Audace-class destroyer. Operated in the Adriatic. Sunk by British Hunt-class destroyers HMS Avon Vale and HMS Wheatland south of Lussino on 1 November 1944.
- TA21: (ex-Insidioso, Italian Indomito-class destroyer), Sunk by aircraft torpedo in Fiume on 5 November 1944
- TA22: (ex-Giuseppe Missori, Italian Pilo-class destroyer), Served in the Adriatic. Severely damaged in airstrike by Tuskegee Airmen on 25 June 1944; decommissioned on 8 November and scuttled on 5 February 1945.
- TA23: (ex-Impavido, Italian Ciclone-class torpedo boat). Served on the west coast of Italy.
- TA24 : (ex-Arturo, Italian Ariete-class torpedo boat). Sunk (with TA29) in action with British destroyers HMS Meteor and HMS Lookout in the Battle of the Ligurian Sea on 18 March 1945.
- TA25: (ex-Intrepido, Italian Ciclone-class torpedo boat). Served on the west coast of Italy.
- TA26: (ex-Ardito, Italian Ciclone-class torpedo boat). Served on the west coast of Italy.
- TA27 (ex-Auriga, Italian Ariete-class torpedo boat). Bombed and sunk, Portoferraio on 9 September 1944.
- TA28 (ex-Rigel, Italian Ariete-class torpedo boat). Bombed and sunk Genoa on 4 September 1944.
- TA29 (ex-Eridano, Italian Ariete-class torpedo boat). Sunk (with TA24) in action with British destroyers in the Battle of the Ligurian Sea on 18 March 1945.
- TA30 (ex-Dragone, Italian Ariete-class torpedo boat). Torpedoed by British MTBs on 15 June 1944.
- TA31: (ex-Dardo, Italian Freccia-class destroyer). Captured in Genoa. Damaged in an air raid 25 October 1944 and scuttled 24 April 1945.
- TA32: Former Yugoslav destroyer Dubrovnik which was captured by the Regia Marina in 1941 and renamed Premuda. Re-built by the Germans as a radar picket destroyer armed with 105 mm guns. Commissioned 18 August 1944 and served on the west coast of Italy. Lightly damaged by British destroyers in March 1945 during the Battle of the Ligurian Sea. Scuttled in Genoa 25 April 1945.
- TA33: (ex-Corsaro, ex Squadrista, Italian Soldati-class destroyer). Not completed, sunk on 4 September 1944 while running trials in Genoa.
- TA34: ex-Carrista, Soldati-class destroyer. Not completed.
- TA35: (ex-Giuseppe Dezza, Italian Pilo-class destroyer). Served in the Adriatic.
- TA36: (ex-Stella Polare, Italian Ariete-class torpedo boat). Mined 18 March 1944.
- TA37: (ex-Gladio, Italian Ariete-class torpedo boat). Transferred from the Adriatic to the 9th Torpedo Boat Flotilla in the Aegean in September 1943. On 7 October 1944 TA37 was sunk by the destroyers, HMS Termagant and HMS Tuscan.
- TA38 (ex-Spada, Italian Ariete-class torpedo boat). Transferred from the Adriatic to the 9th Torpedo Boat Flotilla in the Aegean in September 1943. Lost to an air attack on 13 October 1944.
- TA39 (ex-Daga, Italian Ariete-class torpedo boat). Transferred from the Adriatic to the 9th Torpedo Boat Flotilla in the Aegean in September 1943. On 5 October 1944 TA38 and TA39 intercepted and sank HDML1227 and engaged the Hunt-class destroyers HMS Belvoir and HMS Waddon. Sank after striking a mine on 16 October 1944.
- TA40: (ex-Pugnale, Italian Ariete-class torpedo boat). She was repaired and recommissioned and on 17 February 1945, when off Trieste, was severely damaged in an air attack and scuttled on 4 May 1945.
- TA41: (ex-Lancia, Italian Ariete-class torpedo boat). Damaged by bombs at Trieste and was not repaired. She was wrecked in May.
- TA42: (ex-Alabarda, Italian Ariete-class torpedo boat). Sunk at Venice to air attack on 23 January 1945.
- TA43: Former Yugoslav destroyer Beograd, which was captured by the Italians in 1941 and renamed Sibenico served in the Adriatic and scuttled in Trieste 1 May 1945.
- TA44: (ex-Antonio Pigafetta), Italian Navigatori-class destroyer). Captured at Fiume, served in Adriatic. Sunk in an air raid on Trieste 17 February 1945.
- TA45: (ex-Spica, Italian Ariete-class torpedo boat). Enlisted into German service on the 8 September 1944, but it was fully equipped only on 23 November 1944 (although it participated in the combat duties even though it was not completed). TA45 sailed to her last mission on 10 April 1945 together with TA40 (Pugnale). Her duty was to escort and protect the tank carriers in the Velebit Channel, at the time when the units of People's Liberation Army of Yugoslavia started to land at the island of Rab supported by British light naval forces. TA45 was destroyed by the British motor torpedo boats which waited in the ambush near Cape Glavina on the isle of Krk.
- TA46: (ex-Fionda, Italian Ariete-class torpedo boat). Sunk in an incomplete state at Fiume on 20 February 1945.
- TA47: (ex-Balestra, Italian Ariete-class torpedo boat). Damaged on the slipway and never launched. Balestra, still on the slip, survived the war. Seized by Yugoslavian forces and completed in 1949 as Ucka. She stayed in service until 1963.
- TA48: (ex-T3, former Yugoslav torpedo boat in Italian service). Sunk by bombing, 20 February 1945.
- TA49: (ex-Lira, Italian Spica-class torpedo boat). Destroyed in air raid at La Spezia, 4 November 1944.
