= G32 =

G32, G-32 or G.32 may refer to:

- HMS Lookout (G32), a United Kingdom Royal Navy destroyer which saw service during World War II
- Glock 32, a firearm

and also:

- A model of Ginetta race cars
