= Battle of Ist =

1944 Adriatic Sea battle between Free France and Germany

- Part of the Adriatic Campaign of World War II and Battle of the Mediterranean
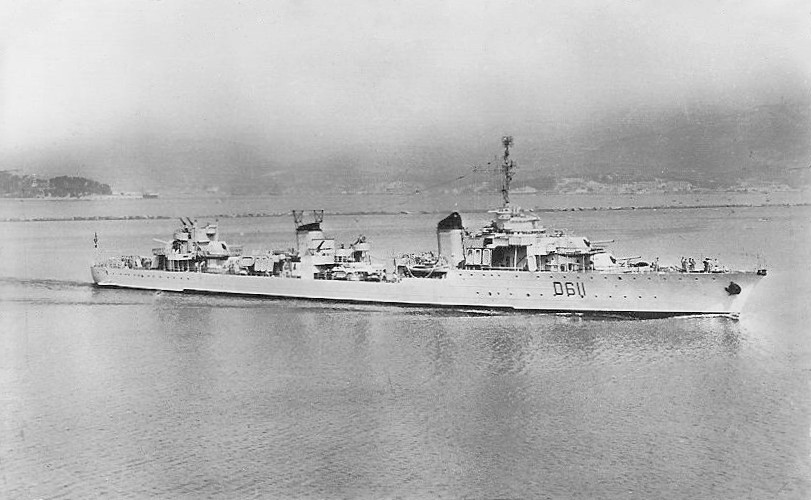
- Free French destroyer Le Terrible
Date	29 February 1944
Location	Off Ist, Adriatic Sea 44°14′N 14°46′E
Result	Free French victory

Belligerents
Free France	Germany

Commanders and leaders
Pierre Lancelot	Jürgen Von Kleist

Strength
2 destroyers	2 torpedo boats 2 corvettes 3 minesweepers 1 freighter

Casualties and losses
None	150 killed and wounded 1 corvette sunk 1 freighter sunk 2 torpedo boats damaged
- The Island of Ist in the Adriatic Sea

The Battle of Ist was a naval engagement in the Adriatic Sea, between the islands of Škarda and Molat, off the island of Ist, on 29 February 1944. The engagement was fought between two Free French Naval Forces destroyers and a Kriegsmarine force of two corvettes, two torpedo boats and three minesweepers. The German flotilla had been deployed to escort a freighter. In the engagement the French managed to destroy the German freighter and a corvette in return for no loss before withdrawing.

== Background ==
In 1944, for operations in the Adriatic Sea, the Royal Navy formed the 24th Destroyer Flotilla at Bari which consisted of ten ships, including three French destroyers, Le Fantasque, Le Terrible and Le Malin. The French under Captain Pierre Lancelot would operate in the northern part of the Adriatic, while the British would do the same but further south. The speed of the French destroyers, being the fastest in the world, allowed them to react swiftly both on intelligence and to strike at targets.

== Action ==
On 29 February the French departed Manfredonia 50 nmi (93 km; 58 mi) north of Bari and headed up the Adriatic. At the same time a German convoy had departed from Pola consisting of a strong escort: the torpedo boats TA36 and TA37 (the former Italian Ariete-class torpedo boats Stella Polare and Gladio); the submarine chasers UJ201 and UJ205, (the former Italian Gabbiano-class corvettes Egeria and Colubrina); and three small minesweepers. They were escorting the 6,311-gross register ton (GRT) freighter Kapitan Diederichsen. The German escorts had only been recently commissioned and were only on their second operation. The two were heading towards each other in the dark of the night with very little moonlight.

At 21:35 hours Le Terrible's radar soon picked up targets further north and sailed towards them. When it was known that the targets were confirmed as non-allied, the French opened fire at roughly 9,000 yards just west of Ist Island, surprising the Germans. Le Malin opened fire on the largest of the targets which was the freighter and soon scored a hit. The Germans attempted to lay a smoke screen, but the destroyers with their speed soon closed in using their radar. Le Terrible scored more hits on the freighter while Le Malin targeted the closest of the escorts. At 4,500 yards (4,100 m) Le Terrible fired a salvo of torpedoes; the first salvo missed but the first device of the second salvo hit the freighter amidships which then caused her to burn fiercely and she soon drifted helplessly.

Meanwhile, UJ201 was soon struck by Le Malin's well-directed 90-pound (41 kg) shells; now having found the range, the German corvette was hit six more times and was soon a burning wreck. Le Malin was close enough to launch a salvo of torpedoes; one hit and was enough to detonate the ship's magazine causing a tremendous explosion lighting up the sky. She sank immediately and all hands went with her. Both Le Terrible and Le Malin then took on the rest of the German escorts; TA36 suffered near misses and was soon hit right on the end of the bow suffering light damage. TA37 however was hit in the engine room and burst into flames which caused her speed to drop rapidly.

Lancelot was about to finish off the German ship, but on seeing low fast-moving silhouettes of potential E-boats he decided to withdraw. They were in fact the motor minesweepers coming in to help with the crew of the stricken freighter and search for survivors of the destroyed UJ201. Lancelot headed south back to port.

== Aftermath ==
The Kapitan Diederichsen remained afloat but only for some time, an attempt to tow failed and the survivors were taken off by the German escorts. The heavily damaged TA37 was towed successfully and made it to Pola. The French force remained in the Adriatic for half of the year bombarding Zante, and on 19 March sank two Siebel ferries SF273 and SF274 on their way to Pylos and crippled another two. In August they took part in Operation Dragoon, the invasion of southern France.
