= Palestro-class destroyer =

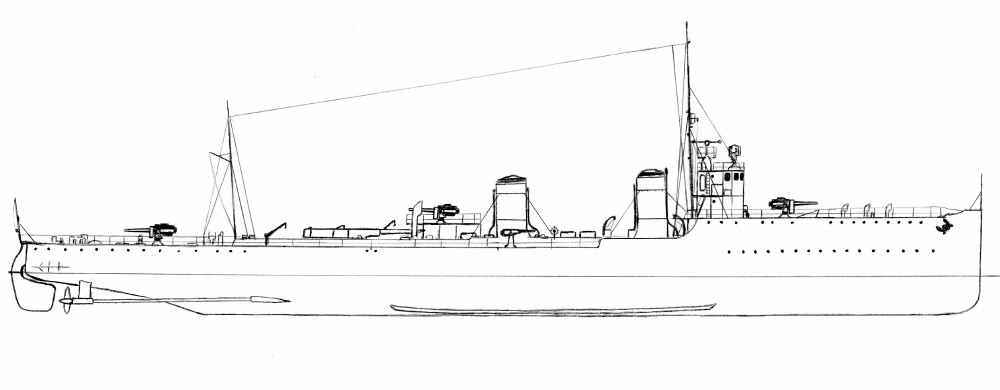
- Line drawing of a Palestro-class destroyer

Class overview
- Name: Palestro class
- Builders: Cantiere navale fratelli Orlando, Orlando yard, Livorno
- Operators: Regia Marina; Kriegsmarine
- Succeeded by: Generali-class destroyer
- Built: 1917–1923
- In commission: 1921–1944
- Planned: 8
- Completed: 4
- Lost: 4

General characteristics
- Type: Destroyer rerated as Torpedo boats in 1938
- Displacement: 875 long tons (889 t) standard; 1,076 long tons (1,093 t) full
- Length: 81.9 m (268 ft 8 in) o/a; 80 m (262 ft 6 in) w/l
- Beam: 8 m (26 ft 3 in)
- Draught: 2.7 m (8 ft 10 in)
- Propulsion: 4 × Thornycroft boilers; 2 × Zoelly steam turbines; 18,000 hp (13,423 kW); 2 shafts
- Speed: 32 knots (59 km/h; 37 mph)
- Range: 1,970 nmi (3,650 km; 2,270 mi) at 14 knots (26 km/h; 16 mph)
- Complement: 118
- Armament: 4 × Schneider-Armstrong 1917 model 102/45 mm main guns; 2 × Ansaldo 76/40 mm guns; 2 × 6.5/80 mm guns; 4 × 450 mm (18 in) torpedo tubes; From 10 to 38 mines

The Palestro-class were four destroyers of the Italian Regia Marina that saw service from the mid-1920s to World War II.

The ships were designed in 1915 and based on the Audace-class destroyer. Eight ships were ordered, but because of wartime shortages of materials only four were eventually completed. These four ships were laid down in 1917 at the Orlando shipyard in Livorno, but were not finally completed until 1921–1923. In 1938 they were re-rated as torpedo boats.

The ships had an overall length of 81.9 m (268 ft 8 in), a beam of 8.0 m (26 ft 3 in), and a draught of 2.7 m (8 ft 10 in). Standard displacement was 875 long tons (889 t), increasing to 1,076 long tons (1,093 t) at full load. The complement consisted of 118 officers and enlisted personnel.

Propulsion was provided by four Thornycroft boilers supplying steam to two Zoelly steam turbines, which drove two shafts. The machinery was rated at 18,000 shaft horsepower (13,423 kW), giving a designed speed of 32 knots (59 km/h; 37 mph). The ships had a range of approximately 1,970 nautical miles (3,650 km; 2,270 mi) at 14 knots (26 km/h; 16 mph).

Armament consisted of four 102 mm/45 Schneider-Armstrong Model 1917 guns in single mounts, supplemented by two 76/40 mm Ansaldo guns and two 6.5 mm machine guns for anti-aircraft defence. The torpedo armament comprised four 450 mm (18 in) torpedo tubes arranged in two twin mounts. The class was also fitted with capacity for between 10 and 38 naval mines depending on operational requirements.

The design was subsequently enlarged into the Sella-class destroyers, a design that was developed into a series of medium-sized Italian destroyer classes.

== Ships ==
- Palestro (PT) was laid down in April 1917, launched on 23 March 1919 and completed in January 1921. She was sunk by the British submarine HMS Osiris off Durrës, Albania, on 22 September 1940.
- Confienza (CF) was laid down in May 1917, launched on 18 December 1920 and completed in April 1923. She sank after a collision with auxiliary cruiser Capitano A. Cecchi off Brindisi on 20 November 1940.
- San Martino (SM) was laid down in April 1917, launched on 8 September 1920 and completed in October 1922. She was captured by the Germans at Piraeus, Greece, on 9 September 1943, and was commissioned into the Kriegsmarine on 28 October 1943 as TA17. She was mined on 18 June 1944, and bombed on 18 September 1944 while under repair. She was finally scuttled at Salamis on 12 October 1944.
- Solferino (SL) was laid down in April 1917, launched on 28 April 1920 and completed in October 1921. She was captured by the Germans at Souda, Crete, on 9 September 1943, and was commissioned into the Kriegsmarine on 25 July 1944 as TA18. She was badly damaged by gunfire during an encounter with the British destroyers HMS Termagant and Tuscan off Skiathos, in the Aegean Sea, then ran aground near Volos, and was destroyed by her crew.

== See also ==
- List of Italian destroyers
- Torpedoboot Ausland

== Bibliography ==
- Fraccaroli, Aldo (1985). "Italy". In Gray, Randal (ed.). Conway's All the World's Fighting Ships 1906–1921. Annapolis: Naval Institute Press. pp. 252–290. ISBN 978-0-87021-907-8.
- Whitley, M. J. (1988). Destroyers of World War Two: An International Encyclopedia. Annapolis, Maryland: Naval Institute Press. ISBN 0-87021-326-1.
