= German torpedo boat TA37 =

Historical military torpedo boat

History

Italy
- Name: Gladio
- Builder: CRDA, Trieste
- Laid down: 9 January 1943
- Launched: 15 June 1943
- Fate: Seized by Germany September 1943

Germany
- Name: TA37
- Acquired: September 1943
- Commissioned: 8 January 1944
- Fate: Sunk 7 October 1944

General characteristics
- Class & type: Ariete-class torpedo boat
- Displacement: 1,110 long tons (1,130 t) full load
- Length: 83.5 m (273 ft 11 in)
- Beam: 8.62 m (28 ft 3 in)
- Draught: 3.15 m (10 ft 4 in)
- Propulsion: 2 boilers, 2 Tosi steam turbines, 2 shafts; 22,000 shp (16,000 kW)
- Speed: 31.5 knots (58.3 km/h; 36.2 mph)
- Complement: 94

The German torpedo boat TA37 (Note: Torpedoboot Ausland) was an Ariete-class torpedo boat operated by the German Kriegsmarine during the Second World War. The ship was built for the Italian Navy by the shipbuilder CRDA at their Trieste shipyard with the name Gladio in 1943, but was incomplete when Italy surrendered to the Allies in September 1943, and was seized by Nazi Germany. The ship entered service as TA37 in 1944, serving in the Adriatic and Aegean seas and was sunk by British destroyers on 7 October 1944.

== Design and construction ==
The Ariete class was an enlarged derivative of the Italian Spica-class torpedo boat, intended to defend convoys from Italy to North Africa from attacks by British submarines and surface ships. To give the ships a chance of fighting British cruisers and destroyers, the Arietes had a heavier torpedo armament, sacrificing a 100-millimetre (3.9 in) gun and some speed to accommodate this. A total of 42 ships were planned, but only 16 had been laid down by the time of Italy's surrender.

The ships were 83.5 m (273 ft 11 in) long overall and 81.1 m (266 ft 1 in) between perpendiculars, with a beam of 8.62 m (28 ft 3 in) and a draught of 3.15 m (10 ft 4 in). Displacement was 745 long tons (757 t) standard and 1,100 long tons (1,100 t) full load. Two oil-fired water-tube boilers supplied steam at 25 atm (2,500 kPa; 370 psi) and 350 °C (662 °F) to two sets of Tosi geared steam turbines. The machinery was rated at 22,000 shaft horsepower (16,000 kW), giving a speed of 31.5 knots (58.3 km/h; 36.2 mph).

Main gun armament was two OTO Melara 100 mm/47 dual-purpose guns, while the planned close-in anti-aircraft battery consisted of two Breda 37 mm cannon and ten 20 mm cannon. Torpedo armament was to be two triple mounts for 450 mm (17.7 in) torpedo tubes. 28 mines could be carried. Owing to supply problems, however, the Arietes did not complete with the intended torpedo and anti-aircraft armament. TA37 completed with five 450 mm torpedo tubes (one triple and one twin mount), and with an anti-aircraft outfit of 14 20 mm cannon. (Note: Freivogel states that TA37 had two 37 mm guns and ten 20 mm (in 1 quadruple, 2 twin and 2 single mounts, while Whitley states that TA37 had 40 mm guns instead of 37 mm. Lenton gives a close-in armament of four 37 mm guns and twelve 20 mm (2 quadruple mounts and 4 single).) The ship had a crew in German service of 94 officers and enlisted.

Gladio was laid down at Cantieri Riuniti dell'Adriatico (CRDA)'s Trieste shipyard on 9 January 1943 and was launched on 15 June that year. On 8 September 1943, an Armistice between Italy and the Allies was announced, and in response, German forces carried out pre-planned operations to disarm Italian forces, which resulted in ships under construction, like Gladio, being seized and completed by the Germans. Gladio was completed by the Germans as TA37 on 8 January 1944.

== Service ==
TA37 and sister ship TA36 were the first two Arietes building on the Adriatic coast to complete, and were used to escort convoys from Pola to the Aegean. On the night of 28/29 February 1944, TA37 and TA36, together with the ex-Italian corvettes UJ 201 and UJ 202 and three R boats (motor minesweepers) were escorting the transport Käpitan Diederichsen when the convoy was attacked by the large French destroyers Le Malin and Le Terrible off the island of Ist. Le Terrible hit Käpitan Diederichsen with gunfire and a torpedo, setting the transport on fire, while Le Malin sank UJ 201 and hit TA37 in the engine room, disabling her. The French then broke off the action, mistaking the R boats for motor torpedo boats. TA 37 was towed back to Pola, while Käpitan Diederichsen sank under tow.

In September 1944, the British launched an offensive against German forces evacuating from islands in the Aegean, and on 20 September, TA37, together with TA38 and TA39, was ordered to the Aegean to assist with the evacuation. On 22 September, the three torpedo boats encountered the British destroyers Belvoir and Whaddon in the Strait of Otranto, but the three torpedo boats used their superior speed to escape unharmed. They continued their transfer to the Aegean via the Gulf of Patras and the Corinth Canal. On 7 October, TA37, the subchaser UJ210 and the harbour patrol boat GK32 were escorting the minelayer Zeus (carrying 1125 troops) when they were intercepted by the British destroyers Termagant and Tuscan in the Gulf of Salonica. The three escorts were sunk by gunfire from the two British destroyers, with 103 killed aboard TA37, but Zeus escaped.

== Bibliography ==
- Freivogel, Z. (2000). Marine Arsenal Band 46: Beute-Zerstörer und -Torpedoboote der Kriegsmarine (in German). Wölfersheim-Berstadt: Pozdun-Pallas Verlag. ISBN 3-7909-0701-4.
- Gardiner, Robert; Chesneau, Roger, eds. (1980). Conway's All The World's Fighting Ships 1922–1946. London: Conway Maritime Press. ISBN 0-85177-146-7.
- Gröner, Erich; Jung, Dieter; Maass, Martin (1983). Die deutschen Kriegsschiffe 1815–1945: Band 2: Torpedoboote, Zerstörer, Schnellboote, Minensuchboote, Minenräumboote (in German). Koblenz: Bernard & Graef Verlag. ISBN 3-7637-4801-6.
- Lenton, H. T. (1975). German Warships of the Second World War. London: Macdonald and Jane's. ISBN 0-356-04661-3.
- O'Hara, Vincent P. (2011). The German Fleet at War, 1939–1945 (eBook ed.). Annapolis, Maryland, USA: Naval Institute Press. ISBN 978-1-61251-397-3.
- Rohwer, Jürgen; Hümmelchen, Gerhard (1992). Chronology of the War at Sea 1939–1945. London: Greenhill Books. ISBN 1-85367-117-7.
- Whitley, M. J. (2000). Destroyers of World War Two: An International Encyclopedia. London: Cassell & Co. ISBN 1-85409-521-8.
