= Operation Bowler =

1945 Allied WWII aerial attack on Venice, Italy

Coordinates: 45.447°N 12.288°E

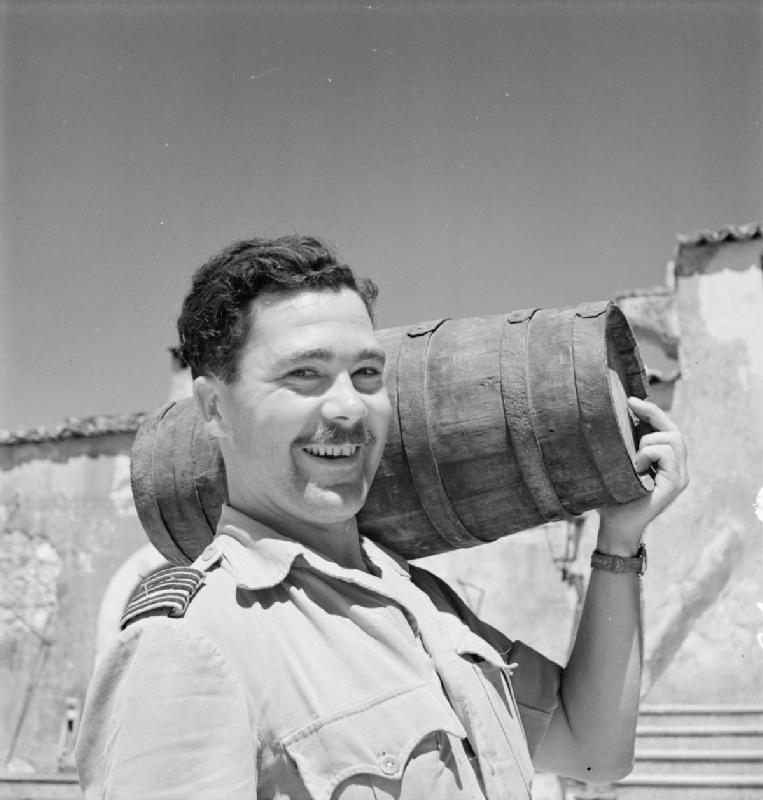
- George Westlake, responsible for the success of Bowler, carrying a cask of wine
- Type: Aerial bombardment
- Location: Venice, Italy
- Commanded by: George Westlake
- Objective: Destruction of German shipping and barges
- Date: 21 March 1945; 3:30 p.m. – 3:50 p.m.
- Executed by: (United Kingdom) 239 Wing RAF; (United States) 79th Fighter Group
- Outcome: Success
- Casualties: 1 Aircraft shot down (pilot rescued); Nil killed Nil injured

Operation Bowler was an air attack on Venice harbour by Allied aircraft on 21 March 1945, as part of the Italian campaign in the Second World War. The raid was led by Acting Wing Commander, later Group Captain, George Westlake of the Royal Air Force.

By early 1945, the rail and road networks of northern Italy had sustained severe damage, forcing the Germans to resort to shipping goods into Venice and then moving them from there along rivers and canals. An attack on the harbour was thus deemed necessary by Allied command, although the risk of damage to the city's architectural and artistic treasures was high, as it had been in other battles of the Italian campaign, such as Battle of Monte Cassino. The operation was planned to be precise to avoid any such damage and was named Operation Bowler by Air Vice-Marshal Robert Foster, as a reminder to those involved that they would be "bowler hatted" (returned to civilian life) or worse should Venice be damaged.

Having assessed the weather after mist early in the morning, just after 3:30 p.m. 16 Mustangs of 260 Squadron and 20 Thunderbolts of the 79th Fighter Group attacked 45 anti-aircraft sites with guns, bombs and rockets. When the flak-sites had been suppressed, the main force bombers (24 Kittyhawks and 40 Mustangs led by Westlake in a Warhawk from 250 Squadron, 239 Wing) with Kittyhawk and Mustang squadrons that specialised in dive-bombing, The bombers dived in to attack almost vertically, to ensure precision, with civilian observers feeling safe enough to climb on the city's rooftops to observe the attack and with the only architectural damage being no more than a few broken windows.

The attack sank the German torpedo boat TA42 (ex Italian Alabarda), two merchant ships as well as naval escorts and smaller vessels. It seriously damaged a large cargo ship and destroyed five warehouses, an Axis mine stockpile (blowing a 100-yard (91 m) hole in the quayside) and other harbour infrastructure, such as an underwater training establishment for frogmen and human torpedoes.

Soon afterwards, Westlake was awarded the Distinguished Service Order for "excellent leadership, great tactical ability and exceptional determination", having already won the Distinguished Flying Cross in 1942 for continuous gallantry in around 300 operational sorties.

== Bibliography ==
- Jackson, William; Gleave, Tom (2004) [1988]. Butler, James (ed.). The Mediterranean and Middle East: Victory in the Mediterranean, Part III November 1944 to May 1945. History of the Second World War, United Kingdom Military Series. Vol. VI (pbk. facs. repr. Naval and Military Press, Uckfield ed.). London: HMSO. pp. 304−305. ISBN 978-1-84-574072-6.
