= Ålesund-class destroyer =

Proposed Norwegian warship design

Class overview
- Name: Ålesund-class destroyer
- Builders: Horten naval dockyard
- Operators: Royal Norwegian Navy
- Planned: 2
- Completed: 0

General characteristics
- Type: Destroyer
- Displacement: 1,220 long tons (1,240 t) standard
- Length: 100 m (328 ft 1 in) o/a
- Beam: 9.9 m (32 ft 6 in)
- Draught: 2.8 m (9 ft 2 in)
- Installed power: 30,000 shp (22,000 kW)
- Propulsion: Geared Steam turbines; 2 shafts
- Speed: 34 knots (63 km/h; 39 mph)
- Armament: 4 × 120 mm (4.7 in) guns; 2 × 40 mm Bofors gun; 4 × 533 mm torpedo tubes

The Ålesund class was a proposed class of destroyers planned for the Royal Norwegian Navy. Construction began on two ships in 1938, but the incomplete ships were captured during the German invasion of Norway in 1940. While Germany continued construction works on the two destroyers, neither were completed, with one sunk by sabotage in 1944 and the other by British bombers in 1945. The Norwegians raised one of the destroyers and attempted to complete it, but the incomplete ship was sold for scrap in 1956.

== Design ==
Norway authorised the construction of two destroyers for the Royal Norwegian Navy in the 1938 budget. These were the first modern destroyers ordered by Norway, and were considerably larger than the Sleipner-class torpedo boats which were being built at the time and were Norway's only modern torpedo craft.

The ships were to be 100.0 m (328 ft 1 in) long overall and 95.0 m (311 ft 8 in) between perpendiculars, with a beam of 9.9 m (32 ft 6 in) and a mean draught of 2.8 m (9 ft 2 in). Displacement was 1,220 long tons (1,240 t) standard. Three Yarrow water-tube boilers in individual boiler rooms fed steam at 32 atm (470 psi; 3,200 kPa) to two sets of de Laval geared impulse steam turbines, driving two shafts. The machinery was rated at 30,000 shp (22,000 kW), giving a speed of 34 knots (63 km/h; 39 mph). 300 long tons (300 t) of oil could be carried, giving a range of 3,100 nautical miles (5,700 km; 3,600 mi) at 19 knots (35 km/h; 22 mph).

Armament was planned to be four 120 mm (4.7 in) guns, (Note: Probably to be Bofors-designed weapons, as used in the minelayer Olav Tryggvason.) with one twin-mount forward and two single-mounts aft. Anti-aircraft defences consisted of two Bofors 40 mm L/60 guns, (Note: Four Bofors 40 mm according to Gröner.) backed up by two 13 mm machine guns. Two twin 533 mm (21-inch) torpedo tubes were to be fitted. Crew was to be 130 officers and other ranks.

== Construction ==
The two as-yet unnamed destroyers (Note: Freivogel and Gröner refer to the two ships as I and II.) were laid down in April 1939 at the naval dockyard at Horten, with completion planned for 1943. They were still at an early stage of construction when Germany invaded Norway in April 1940, and were captured when German forces seized Horten. Germany decided to continue construction for the Kriegsmarine, with the names ZN4 and ZN5. (Note: Zerstörer Norwegen (Norwegian destroyer)) They were renamed TA7 and TA8 (Note: Torpedoboot Ausland (foreign torpedo boats)) in early 1942. An entirely new armament was to fitted, consisting of to be three 10.5 cm (4.1 in) SK C/32s on high-angle mounts, two 3.7 cm (1.5 in) SK C/30 close-in anti-aircraft guns and six 2 cm (0.8 in) C/30 AA guns, with a quadruple mount for 53.3 cm (21 inch) torpedo tubes.

Construction of the two ships was delayed by extensive sabotage. TA7 was launched on 29 May 1941, with TA8 not launched until 30 June 1943. It was decided to tow TA7 to Germany for completion, but TA7 was sunk at Horten on 27 September 1944 by a bomb placed in the ship's turbine room, shortly before the ship was due to depart for Germany. TA8 was sunk during a British air raid against Horten on the night of 23/24 February 1945.

After the end of the war in Europe in 1945, the wreck of TA8 was raised by the Norwegians, who decided to complete the ship with the name Ålesund, but work was abandoned in 1950 and the hulk sold for scrap in 1956.
