= Ariete-class torpedo boat =

Group of Italian Navy destroyer escorts

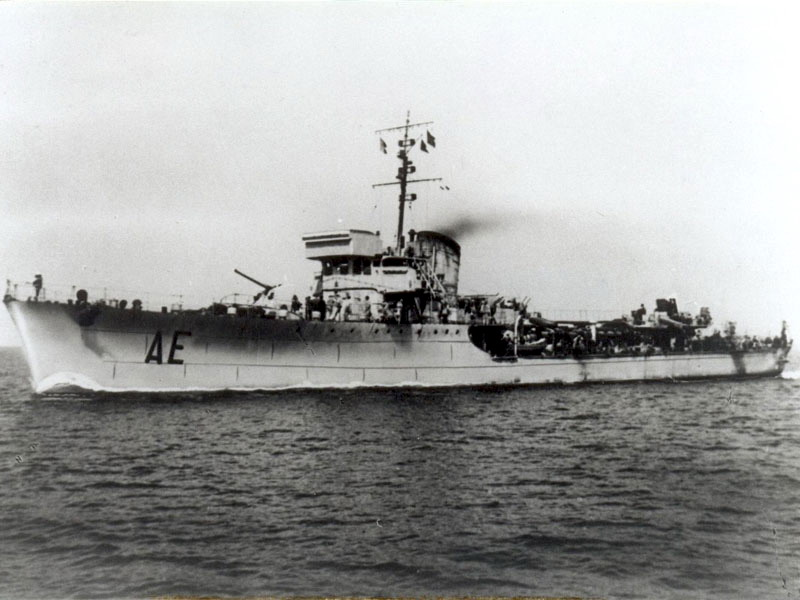
- Ariete underway

Class overview
- Operators: Regia Marina; Kriegsmarine; Yugoslav Navy
- Preceded by: Spica-class torpedo boat
- In commission: 1941–1945
- Planned: 42
- Completed: 16
- Lost: 14

General characteristics
- Type: Torpedo boat
- Displacement: 745 long tons (757 t) standard; 1,100 long tons (1,118 t) full load
- Length: 83.5 m (273 ft 11 in)
- Beam: 8.62 m (28 ft 3 in)
- Draught: 3.15 m (10 ft 4 in)
- Installed power: 22,000 hp (16,400 kW)
- Propulsion: 2 shaft geared steam turbines; 2 boilers
- Speed: 31.5 knots (36.2 mph; 58.3 km/h)
- Complement: 158
- Electronic warfare & decoys: Sonar
- Armament: 2 × 100 mm (4 in) / 47 caliber dual-purpose guns; 10 × 20 mm (0.79 in) anti-aircraft guns; 6 × 450 mm (18 in) torpedo tubes (2 × triple mounts); 20 mines

The Ariete-class torpedo boats were a group of destroyer escorts built for the Regia Marina Italian Royal Navy during World War II. They were larger versions of the Spica-class torpedo boats and designed to escort convoys to North Africa. Of the 42 units planned, sixteen ships were eventually ordered but only one was completed by the time of the armistice, Ariete, built in the Sestri Ponente shipyards and commissioned on 5 August 1943. The namesake ship was also the only one to survive the war. After the war it was ceded to the Yugoslav Navy (1949), and renamed Durmitor.

Most of the other ships were captured and completed by the Germans, entered service with the Kriegsmarine as Torpedoboot Ausland and eventually sunk in the course of operations across the Aegean and the Adriatic. Fionda (renamed TA46 by the Germans) was sunk in Fiume by an Allied bomber on 20 February 1945, together with her twin Balestra / TA47. Both ships at the time were unfinished. Recovered by the Yugoslavs in 1947, it was used to complete TA47, which entered service in the Yugoslav Navy as Učka. It was decommissioned in 1971.

== Design ==
Compared to the Spica class it was developed from, the Ariete class had lost one of the three 100 mm (4 in)/47 caliber dual-purpose guns, whereas torpedo armament had grown from four to six 450 mm (18 in) torpedo tubes, in two triple mountings on the ship's centreline. The anti-aircraft suite included ten 20 mm cannons.

== Ships ==
Ship	German number	Builder	Launched	Operational history
Alabarda	TA42	CRDA Trieste	7 May 1944	Sunk 21 March 1945 during Operation Bowler in Venice.
Ariete	—	Ansaldo, Genoa	6 March 1942	She was the only unit to be completed before the armistice. She was at La Spezia 8 September 1943 and arrived at Malta, then under Allied control, 20 September 1943. She was transferred as war reparation to Yugoslavia in 1949.
Arturo	TA24	Ansaldo, Genoa	27 March 1943	One of the German units that took part in the bombardment of Bastia on 1 March 1944. Sunk 18 March 1945 at the Battle of the Ligurian Sea by the British destroyers HMS Lookout and HMS Meteor.
Auriga	TA27	Ansaldo, Genoa	15 April 1943	Lost 9 June 1944 to an air attack by P-47s of the U.S. 332d Fighter Group.
Balestra	TA47	Cantieri navali del Quarnaro, Fiume^{A}		Not completed during the war, damaged by air raid on slipway, subsequently completed for the Yugoslav Navy in 1949 as Učka; scrapped in 1971.
Daga	TA39	CRDA, Trieste^{B}	15 July 1943	Along with Spada took part in the sinking of British motor boat ML-1227 on 5 October 1944. Sunk 16 October 1944, scuttled after hitting a mine off Thessaloniki.
Dragone	TA30	Ansaldo, Genoa	14 August 1943	Sunk 15 June 1944 by U.S. PT boats.
Eridano	TA29	Ansaldo, Genoa	12 July 1943	Sunk 18 March 1945 at the Battle of the Ligurian Sea by the British destroyers HMS Lookout and HMS Meteor.
Fionda	TA46	CNQ, Fiume^{A}		Lost 20 February 1945 in Fiume, when still under construction. Scrapped after the war.
Gladio	TA37	CRDA, Trieste^{B}	15 June 1943	Badly damaged by French destroyers Le Terrible and Le Malin at the Battle of Ist in February 1944. Sunk 7 October 1944.
Lancia	TA41	CRDA, Trieste^{B}	7 May 1944	Sunk 17 February 1945, scuttled after being hit by an aerial bomb in Trieste.
Pugnale	TA40	CRDA, Trieste^{B}	1 August 1944	Scuttled 4 May 1945 at Monfalcone.
Rigel	TA28	Ansaldo, Genoa	22 May 1943	She took part in the shelling of Bastia on 1 March 1944. Sunk 4 September 1944.
Spada	TA38	CRDA, Trieste^{B}	1 July 1943	Sank British motor boat ML-1227 on 5 October 1944. Sunk 13 October 1944, scuttled after being damaged by air strike.
Spica	TA45	CNQ, Fiume^{A}	30 January 1944	Lost 13 April 1945 to British motor torpedo boats in the Morlacca Channel.
Stella Polare	TA36	CNQ, Fiume^{A}	11 July 1943	Towed damaged TA37 to safety after a battle with French destroyers Le Terrible and Le Malin at the Battle of Ist in February 1944. Sunk 18 March 1944 by a German mine.
