= Derick Hetherington =

Rear-Admiral Derick Hetherington CB DSC*
- Born: 27 June 1911; Brentford, Middlesex, England
- Died: 23 November 1992 (aged 81); Bullingdon, Oxfordshire, England
- Military career
- Allegiance: United Kingdom
- Branch: Royal Navy
- Rank: Rear-Admiral
- Commands: HMS Lookout; Malta Dockyard
- Conflicts: World War II
- Awards: Companion of the Order of the Bath; Distinguished Service Cross & Bar

Rear-Admiral Derick Henry Fellowes Hetherington CB DSC & Bar (27 June 1911 – 23 November 1992) was a Royal Navy officer who became Flag Officer, Malta.

== Early life and education ==
Hetherington was born on 27 June 1911, and educated at St Neot's School, Eversley and the Royal Naval College, Dartmouth.

In 1942 he married Josephine Mary Vavasour; they had two sons and three daughters.

== Naval career ==
Hetherington served in the Second World War becoming commanding officer of the destroyer HMS Windsor in early May 1943 and commanding officer of the destroyer HMS Lookout in March 1944. He saw action in the Battle of the Ligurian Sea, destroying two German ships in March 1945. After the War he was appointed Captain, (D), 4th Destroyer Squadron from March 1956 to November 1957. In July 1959 he was appointed Flag Officer, Malta, retiring from the service in 1961.

== Later life and death ==
After leaving the Royal Navy, Hetherington was appointed as Domestic Bursar of Merton College, Oxford in 1961, and made a Fellow of the college two years later.

In retirement he served as President of the Watlington Branch of the Royal British Legion from 1981 to 1989.

Hetherington died in 1992 and was buried at St Mary's Church in Pyrton in Oxfordshire.

== Sources ==
- Tucker, Spencer (2011). World War II at Sea: An Encyclopedia, Volume 1. ABC-CLIO. ISBN 9781598844573.

Military offices
Preceded by Sir Charles Madden	Flag Officer, Malta; 1959–1961	Succeeded by Viscount Kelburn
