= German torpedo boat TA27 =

Ariete-class Kriegsmarine torpedo boat

History

Italy
- Name: Auriga
- Builder: Ansaldo, Genoa
- Laid down: 15 July 1942
- Launched: 15 April 1943
- Fate: Seized by Germany September 1943

Germany
- Name: TA27
- Acquired: September 1943
- Commissioned: 28 December 1943
- Fate: Sunk 9 June 1944

General characteristics
- Class & type: Ariete-class torpedo boat
- Displacement: 1,110 long tons (1,130 t) full load
- Length: 83.5 m (273 ft 11 in)
- Beam: 8.62 m (28 ft 3 in)
- Draught: 3.15 m (10 ft 4 in)
- Propulsion: 2 boilers, 2 Tosi steam turbines, 2 shafts; 22,000 shp (16,000 kW)
- Speed: 31.5 knots (58.3 km/h; 36.2 mph)
- Complement: 94
- Armament: 2× OTO Melara 100 mm/47 guns; 3× 37 mm cannon; 6× 20 mm cannon

The German torpedo boat TA27 (Note: Torpedoboot Ausland) was an Ariete-class torpedo boat operated by the German Kriegsmarine during the Second World War. The ship was built for the Italian Navy by the shipbuilder Ansaldo at their Genoa shipyard with the name Auriga in 1942–1943, but was incomplete when Italy surrendered to the Allies in September 1943, and was seized by Nazi Germany. The ship entered service as TA27 in December 1943, serving in the Tyrrhenian Sea and was sunk by air attack on 9 June 1944.

== Design and construction ==
The Ariete class was an enlarged derivative of the Italian Spica-class torpedo boat, intended to defend convoys from Italy to North Africa from attacks by British submarines and surface ships. To give the ships a chance of fighting British cruisers and destroyers, the Arietes had a heavier torpedo armament, sacrificing a 100-millimetre (3.9 in) gun and some speed to accommodate this. A total of 42 ships were planned, but only 16 had been laid down by the time of Italy's surrender.

The ships were 83.5 m (273 ft 11 in) long overall and 81.1 m (266 ft 1 in) between perpendiculars, with a beam of 8.62 m (28 ft 3 in) and a draught of 3.15 m (10 ft 4 in). Displacement was 745 long tons (757 t) standard and 1,100 long tons (1,100 t) full load. Two oil-fired water-tube boilers supplied steam at 25 atm (2,500 kPa; 370 psi) and 350 °C (662 °F) to two sets of Tosi geared steam turbines. The machinery was rated at 22,000 shaft horsepower (16,000 kW), giving a speed of 31.5 knots (58.3 km/h; 36.2 mph).

Main gun armament was two OTO Melara 100 mm/47 dual-purpose guns, while the planned close-in anti-aircraft battery consisted of two Breda 37 mm cannon and ten 20 mm cannon. Torpedo armament was to be two triple mounts for 450 mm (17.7 in) torpedo tubes. 28 mines could be carried. Owing to supply problems, however, the Arietes did not complete with the intended torpedo and anti-aircraft armament. TA27 completed with an anti-aircraft outfit of three 37 mm cannon and six 20 mm guns. (Note: Lenton suggests that TA27 was completed with the intended torpedo armament, but Freivogel and Gröner are not clear on whether torpedo tubes were fitted.) The ship had a crew in German service of 94 officers and enlisted.

Auriga was laid down at Ansaldo's Genoa shipyard on 15 July 1942 (Note: One of five Ariete-class torpedo boats laid down by Ansaldo on 15 July 1942.) and was launched on 15 April 1943. On 8 September 1943, an Armistice between Italy and the Allies was announced, and in response, German forces carried out pre-planned operations to disarm Italian forces, which resulted in ships under construction, like Auriga, being seized and completed by the Germans. Auriga was completed by the Germans as TA27 on 28 December 1943.

== Service ==
TA27 carried out sea trials on 9 February 1944, and joined the 10th Torpedo Boat Flotilla of the Kriegsmarine, operating out of Genoa and La Spezia, with duties including minelaying, shore bombardment, convoy escort and patrolling. The 10th Flotilla regularly shelled Bastia, Corsica, with TA27 taking part in four bombardment missions against that port.

On 18 February, TA27 left La Spezia in company with TA24 and TA28 on a mission to lay mines south of the Tiber estuary. The force clashed with Allied naval forces near Civitavecchia on the journey south, with TA28 hit by a shell that did not explode. They continued on course, but were forced to abandon the operation when a boiler problem forced TA24 to slow to 17 kn (31 km/h; 20 mph). The three torpedo boats clashed with Allied motor torpedo boats near Giglio island on the return journey, claiming two of them sunk. On 25 February, TA27, together with TA24 and TA25, were returning from a minelaying operation when they encountered a group of German Marinefährprahm (naval ferries). A firefight broke out between the two German groups, with some Allied motor torpedo boats also becoming involved. Although no ships were sunk, two of the German torpedo boats were damaged and several men killed or wounded.

On 9 June 1944, TA27 was attacked by three American fighter-bombers in Portoferraio harbour. The ship was disabled and part of her anti-aircraft outfit knocked out, but she remained afloat. After 90 minutes, eight more aircraft attacked, blowing off the ship's stern, and without power or pumps, flooding continued until TA27 capsized that night. Two crew were killed. The wreck was blown up on 14 June.

== Bibliography ==
- Freivogel, Z. (2000). Marine Arsenal Band 46: Beute-Zerstörer und -Torpedoboote der Kriegsmarine (in German). Wölfersheim-Berstadt: Pozdun-Pallas Verlag. ISBN 3-7909-0701-4.
- Gardiner, Robert; Chesneau, Roger, eds. (1980). Conway's All The World's Fighting Ships 1922–1946. London: Conway Maritime Press. ISBN 0-85177-146-7.
- Gröner, Erich (1990). German Warships 1815–1945: Volume One: Major Surface Vessels. Annapolis, Maryland, US: Naval Institute Press. ISBN 0-87021-790-9.
- Lenton, H. T. (1975). German Warships of the Second World War. London: Macdonald and Jane's. ISBN 0-356-04661-3.
- O'Hara, Vincent P. (2011). The German Fleet at War, 1939–1945 (eBook ed.). Annapolis, Maryland, USA: Naval Institute Press. ISBN 978-1-61251-397-3.
- Rohwer, Jürgen; Hümmelchen, Gerhard (1992). Chronology of the War at Sea 1939–1945. London: Greenhill Books. ISBN 1-85367-117-7.
- Whitley, M. J. (2000). Destroyers of World War Two: An International Encyclopedia. London: Cassell & Co. ISBN 1-85409-521-8.
