= HMS Meteor (G73) =

Destroyer of the Royal Navy

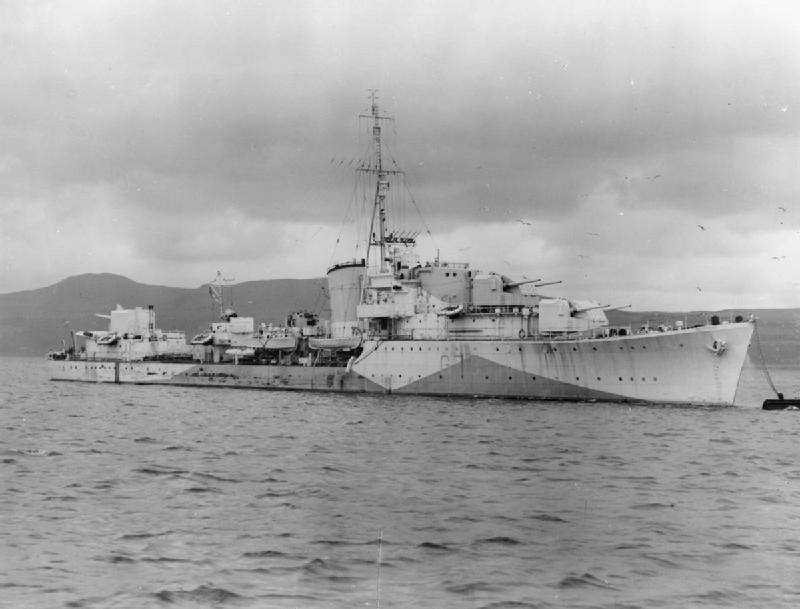

History

United Kingdom
- Name: HMS Meteor
- Ordered: 7 July 1939
- Builder: Alexander Stephen and Sons, Linthouse, Scotland
- Laid down: 14 September 1940
- Launched: 3 November 1941
- Completed: 12 August 1942
- Fate: Sold to the Turkish Navy on 29 June 1959, renamed Piyale Paşa
- Notes: Pennant number G73

History

Turkey
- Name: Piyale Paşa
- Acquired: 29 June 1959
- Fate: Discarded 1979?

General characteristics (as built)
- Class & type: M-class destroyer
- Displacement: 1,920 long tons (1,950 t) (standard); 2,725 long tons (2,769 t) (deep load)
- Length: 362 ft 3 in (110.4 m) (o/a)
- Beam: 37 ft (11.3 m)
- Draught: 14 ft (4.3 m)
- Installed power: 48,000 shp (36,000 kW); 2 × Admiralty 3-drum boilers
- Propulsion: 2 × shafts; 2 × geared steam turbines
- Speed: 36 knots (67 km/h; 41 mph)
- Range: 5,500 nmi (10,200 km; 6,300 mi) at 15 knots (28 km/h; 17 mph)
- Complement: 190
- Sensors & processing systems: ASDIC; Type 285 gunnery radar; Type 290 air warning radar
- Armament: 3 × twin 4.7 in (120 mm) Mk XI dual-purpose guns; 1 × single QF 4 in (102 mm) Mk V anti-aircraft gun; 1 × quadruple QF 2-pdr (40 mm) Mk VIII AA guns; 2 × single Oerlikon 20 mm (0.8 in) AA guns; 2 × quadruple, 2 × twin 0.5 in (12.7 mm) Vickers Mark III anti-aircraft machineguns; 1 × quadruple 21 in (533 mm) torpedo tubes; 42 × depth charges, 2 × racks, 2 × throwers

HMS Meteor was a M-class destroyer built for the Royal Navy during World War II.

== Construction ==
HMS Meteor was ordered on 7 July 1939, as one of eight destroyers of the M class, a near repeat of the previous L-class. The ship was laid down at the Alexander Stephen shipyard of Linthouse, Glasgow on 14 September 1940, launched on 3 November 1941 and commissioned on 12 August 1942.

Meteor completed with the originally specified main gun armament of six 4.7-inch (120 mm) Mark XI guns in fully enclosed Mark XX mounts, but was only fitted with a single set of quadruple 21-inch torpedo tubes, with the planned aft set being sacrificed to accommodate a single 4-inch (102 mm) Mark V anti-aircraft gun. Close in weaponry consisted of a single quadruple 2-pounder (40 mm) "pom-pom" and 6 single 20 mm cannon. Meteor was fitted with Type 291 air/surface search radar and Type 285 anti-aircraft ranging radar.

== Second World War Service ==
On entering service, Meteor joined the 3rd Destroyer Flotilla of the Home Fleet and in September 1942 was deployed as part of the escort for the Arctic Convoy PQ 18 to the Soviet Union and the return Convoy QP 14. Following the return from the Arctic, in November 1942, Meteor acted as part of the destroyer screen for the Home Fleet during Operation Torch, the Anglo-American invasion of French North Africa.

On 18 March 1945 Meteor participated in the Battle of the Ligurian Sea, where she sank the German fleet torpedo boat TA24 (ex-Italian Ariete-class torpedo boat Arturo).

== Postwar service ==
Following the Second World War Meteor, along with three other ships of the same class, was transferred to the Turkish Navy as part of an agreement signed at Ankara on 16 August 1957. They underwent a refit which involved the removal of the after set of torpedo tubes and some secondary armament. They received a new deckhouse and Squid anti-submarine weapons system. On 29 June 1959 they were handed over at Portsmouth. Meteor was renamed Piyale Paşa.
