= Ist (island) =

Island of Croatia

Coordinates: 44°16′N 14°46′E

- Location within Croatia
- Interactive map of Ist

Geography
- Location: Adriatic Sea
- Area: 9.65 km^{2} (3.73 sq mi)

Administration
- Croatia
- County: Zadar County

Demographics
- Population: 182 (2011)
- Pop. density: 18.9/km^{2} (49/sq mi)

Ist is a small island off the Dalmatian coast of Croatia. The closest city to Ist is Zadar. The island has an area of 9.65 km^{2}. Ist is located between the islands of Škarda and Molat.

The entire island has a permanent population of 182. During the past 50 years it has witnessed a slow depopulation which has halved its number of inhabitants. The Croatian Government is attempting to attract people to the island through its National Programme of Islands’ Development as well as economic revival (which could result in the construction of a bridge to nearby Molat). Recently the island has benefited from the development of tourism.

In World War II, the Battle of Ist was a naval engagement off Ist on 29 February 1944. The engagement was fought between Free French navy destroyers and a Kriegsmarine force of two corvettes, two torpedo boats and three minesweepers which were protecting a freighter. The French managed to destroy the German freighter and a corvette without losses of their own before withdrawing.

The island is part of the northern Zadar Archipelago, which has been designated an Important Bird Area (IBA) by BirdLife International because it supports breeding populations of several species of fish-eating seabirds.

== See also ==
- Croatia
- Dalmatia

== Bibliography ==
- Magaš, Damir (2010). "Prirodno geografska osnova–potencijal razvoja otoka Ista i Škarde". Otoci Ist i Škarda. Zadar: Sveučilište u Zadru, Zavod za prostorno uređenje Zadarske županije, Ogranak Matice hrvatske, Hrvatsko geografsko društvo. pp. 63–92. ISBN 978-953-7237-75-2.

=== Name ===
- Šenoa, Milan (1949). "Prilog poznavanju starih naziva naših otoka" [A Contribution to Learning the Old Names of Our Islands]. Hrvatski geografski glasnik (in Serbo-Croatian) (11–12) (published 1950-06-15): 75–82. ISSN 1331-5854.

=== Geology ===
- Waagen, Lukas (1909). Geologische Spezialkarte der im Reichsrate vertretenen Königreiche und Länder der Österreichisch-Ungarischen Monarchie 1:75.000 (PDF) (Map) (in German). Vienna. § 6253: Selve.
- Waagen, Lukas (1914). Erläuterungen zur Geologischen Karte der im Reichsrate vertretenen Königreiche und Länder der Österreichisch-Ungarischen Monarchie: SW-Gruppen Nr. 114 und 117a, Selve und Zapuntello (Zone 28, Kol. XI, und Zone 29, Kol. XI in Spezialkarte der Österr.-ung. Monarchie im Maßtab 1 : 75.000) (PDF) (in German). Vienna.
- Moro, Alan; Ćosović, Vlasta (2013-02-28). "Upper Turonian–Santonian slope limestones of the Islands of Premuda, Ist and Silba (Adriatic Coast, Croatia)". Geologia Croatica. 66 (1): 1–13. doi:10.4154/GC.2013.01. eISSN 1333-4875.

=== Parish ===
- Modrić, Oliver (2025-01-27). "Prijenos i zbrinjavanje gradiva župnih arhiva u Arhiv Zadarske nadbiskupije" [Transfer and storage of materials of the parish archives to the Archives of the Archdiocese of Zadar]. Vjesnik dalmatinskih arhiva (in Serbo-Croatian). 5: 109–124. doi:10.58565/vda.5.1.5. eISSN 2806-8459.
