= Škarda =

Croatian island in the Adriatic Sea

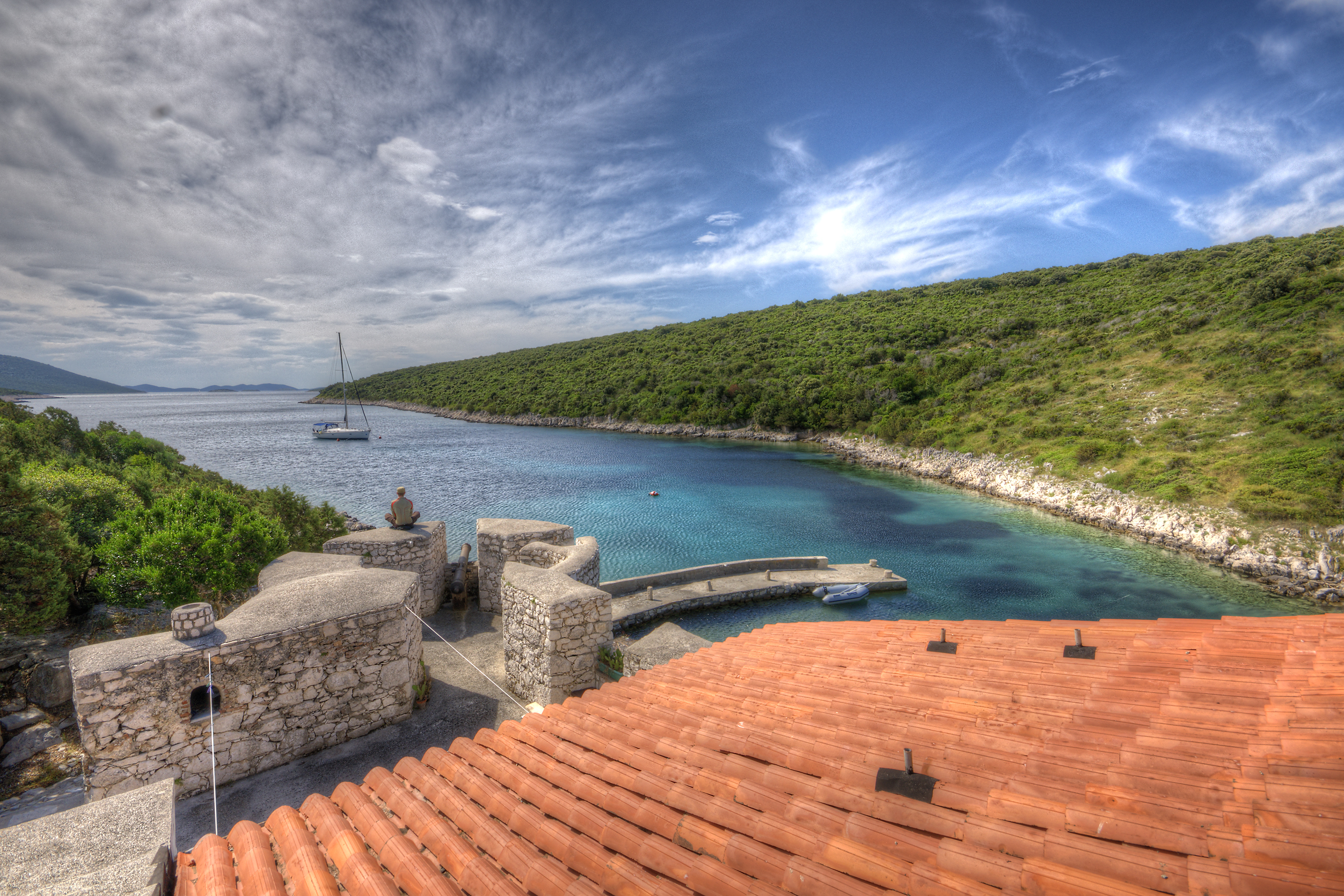

- Location within Croatia
- Interactive map of Škarda

Geography
- Location: Adriatic Sea
- Coordinates: 44°17′00″N 14°42′17″E
- Archipelago: Zadar archipelago
- Area: 3.78 km^{2} (1.46 sq mi)
- Highest elevation: 102 m (335 ft)
- Highest point: Vela Čimba

Administration
- Croatia
- County: Zadar County

Demographics
- Population: 0

Škarda is an uninhabited Croatian island in the Adriatic Sea located between Premuda and Ist (island). Its area is 3.78 km^{2} (1.46 sq mi).

== History ==
The hamlet of Škarda (Trate) that consists of about 16 dwellings was depopulated by the 1990s.

During the Croatian War of Independence, on 10 September 1991, members of a naval special unit, after landing from a motorboat and a sailboat, the Maša and the Nirvana, disabled the Yugoslav Mirna-class patrol boat Biokovo with a Malyutka antitank missile fired from a cove at Škarda island.

== Important Bird Area ==
The island is part of the northern Zadar Archipelago, which has been designated an Important Bird Area (IBA) by BirdLife International because it supports breeding populations of several species of fish-eating seabirds.
