= German torpedo boat TA24 =

Ariete-class torpedo boat

History

Italy
- Name: Arturo
- Builder: Ansaldo, Genoa
- Laid down: 15 July 1942
- Launched: 27 March 1943
- Fate: Seized by Germany September 1943

Germany
- Name: TA24
- Acquired: September 1943
- Commissioned: 4 October 1943
- Fate: Sunk 18 March 1945

General characteristics
- Class & type: Ariete-class torpedo boat
- Displacement: 1,110 long tons (1,130 t) full load
- Length: 83.5 m (273 ft 11 in)
- Beam: 8.62 m (28 ft 3 in)
- Draught: 3.15 m (10 ft 4 in)
- Propulsion: 2 boilers, 2 Tosi steam turbines, 2 shafts; 22,000 shp (16,000 kW)
- Speed: 31.5 knots (58.3 km/h; 36.2 mph)
- Complement: 94
- Armament: 2× OTO Melara 100 mm/47 guns; 12× 20 mm cannon; 6× 450 mm (17.7 in) torpedo tubes; 28 mines

The German torpedo boat TA24 (Note: Torpedoboot Ausland) was an Ariete-class torpedo boat operated by the German Kriegsmarine during the Second World War. The ship was built for the Italian Navy by the shipbuilder Ansaldo at their Genoa shipyard with the name Arturo in 1943, but was incomplete when Italy surrendered to the Allies in September 1943, and was seized by Nazi Germany. The ship entered service as TA24 in October 1943, serving in the Tyrrhenian Sea and was sunk by British destroyers on 18 March 1945.

== Design and construction ==
The Ariete class was an enlarged derivative of the Italian Spica-class torpedo boat, intended to defend convoys from Italy to North Africa from attacks by British submarines and surface ships. To give the ships a chance of fighting British cruisers and destroyers, the Arietes had a heavier torpedo armament, sacrificing a 100-millimetre (3.9 in) gun and some speed to accommodate this. A total of 42 ships were planned, but only 16 had been laid down by the time of Italy's surrender.

The ships were 83.5 m (273 ft 11 in) long overall and 81.1 m (266 ft 1 in) between perpendiculars, with a beam of 8.62 m (28 ft 3 in) and a draught of 3.15 m (10 ft 4 in). Displacement was 745 long tons (757 t) standard and 1,100 long tons (1,100 t) full load. Two oil-fired water-tube boilers supplied steam at 25 atm (2,500 kPa; 370 psi) and 350 °C (662 °F) to two sets of Tosi geared steam turbines. The machinery was rated at 22,000 shaft horsepower (16,000 kW), giving a speed of 31.5 knots (58.3 km/h; 36.2 mph).

Main gun armament was two OTO Melara 100 mm/47 dual-purpose guns, while the planned close-in anti-aircraft battery consisted of two Breda 37 mm cannon and ten 20 mm cannon. Torpedo armament was to be two triple mounts for 450 mm (17.7 in) torpedo tubes. 28 mines could be carried. Owing to supply problems, however, the Arietes did not complete with the intended torpedo and anti-aircraft armament. TA24 completed with the class's designed torpedo armament of six 450 mm torpedo tubes and with an anti-aircraft outfit of twelve 20 mm cannon. The ship had a crew in German service of 94 officers and enlisted.

Arturo was laid down at Ansaldo's Genoa shipyard on 15 July 1942 (Note: One of five Ariete-class torpedo boats laid down by Ansaldo on 15 July 1942.) and was launched on 27 March 1943. On 8 September 1943, an Armistice between Italy and the Allies was announced, and in response, German forces carried out pre-planned operations to disarm Italian forces, which resulted in ships under construction, like Arturo, being seized and completed by the Germans. Arturo was completed by the Germans as TA24 on 4 October 1943.

== Service ==
TA24, like the other Italian torpedo boats on the West coast of Italy, joined the 10th Torpedo Boat Flotilla of the Kriegsmarine based at Genoa, where the flotilla was employed on escort and minelaying duties. On 22–23 December 1943, TA24, the torpedo boat TA23 (formerly the Italian Impavido) and the minelayer Niedersachsen laid a minefield off the north coast of Corsica.

In February 1944, the torpedo boats of the 10th Torpedo Boat Flotilla carried out four minelaying operations, and a series of bombardment operations (Operation Nussknacker) against Bastia, Corsica, with TA24 taking part on five nights, including on 1 March. In May 1944, the 10th Flotilla carried out four minelaying and two reconnaissance sorties, with a further four minelaying operations in June. On the night of 17/18 June 1944, TA24 and TA29 clashed with five British and American motor torpedo boats. TA24 continued to be heavily employed on minelaying and reconnaissance operations during July 1944, clashing several times with Allied coastal forces.

On the night of 1/2 October 1944, TA24, TA29 and TA32 (the former Yugoslav destroyer Dubrovnik) were on the way to lay mines off Sanremo when they encountered the American destroyer Gleaves on patrol. Gleaves engaged the German ships, causing the minelaying mission to be aborted, but TA29 collided with TA24 as the Germans reversed their course, although the two ships managed to separate themselves and the three torpedo boats made for Genoa at maximum speed. The commander of Gleaves believed his ship had sunk two of the German ships, which he thought were merchant ships, while the commander of TA24 thought that their attacker, which he believed to be a French cruiser, was hit by TA24's fire. In fact none of the ships was hit by hostile fire, with TA24 and TA29 receiving minor damage from their collision.

On the night of 17/18 March 1945, TA24, TA29 and TA32, the last three remaining operational ships of the 10th Torpedo Boat Flotilla, carried out a minelaying operation off Corsica, and on the return journey were spotted by Allied shore-based radar at Livorno. The two British destroyers Lookout and Meteor were ordered to engage the German ships, in what became the final major surface battle involving German warships of the war, with the two British destroyers setting separate intercept courses. Lookout engaged first, hitting both TA24 and TA29, immobilising TA29. Lookout concentrated on finishing off TA29, which was eventually sunk after being hit more than 40 times by Lookout. Meteor was left to deal with the other two ships, and sank TA24 with shellfire and torpedoes. TA32, although damaged, managed to escape. About 30 of TA24's crew were killed, with the remainder rescued by Meteor.

== Bibliography ==
- Freivogel, Z. (2000). Marine Arsenal Band 46: Beute-Zerstörer und -Torpedoboote der Kriegsmarine (in German). Wölfersheim-Berstadt: Pozdun-Pallas Verlag. ISBN 3-7909-0701-4.
- Gardiner, Robert; Chesneau, Roger, eds. (1980). Conway's All The World's Fighting Ships 1922–1946. London: Conway Maritime Press. ISBN 0-85177-146-7.
- Gröner, Erich; Jung, Dieter; Maass, Martin (1983). Die deutschen Kriegsschiffe 1815–1945: Band 2: Torpedoboote, Zerstörer, Schnellboote, Minensuchboote, Minenräumboote (in German). Koblenz: Bernard & Graef Verlag. ISBN 3-7637-4801-6.
- Lenton, H. T. (1975). German Warships of the Second World War. London: Macdonald and Jane's. ISBN 0-356-04661-3.
- O'Hara, Vincent P. (2011). The German Fleet at War, 1939–1945 (eBook ed.). Annapolis, Maryland, USA: Naval Institute Press. ISBN 978-1-61251-397-3.
- Rohwer, Jürgen; Hümmelchen, Gerhard (1992). Chronology of the War at Sea 1939–1945. London: Greenhill Books. ISBN 1-85367-117-7.
- Whitley, M. J. (2000). Destroyers of World War Two: An International Encyclopedia. London: Cassell & Co. ISBN 1-85409-521-8.
