= Velebit Channel =

Channel in the Adriatic Sea in Croatia

Coordinates: 44°35′N 14°58′E

- Interactive map of Velebit Channel

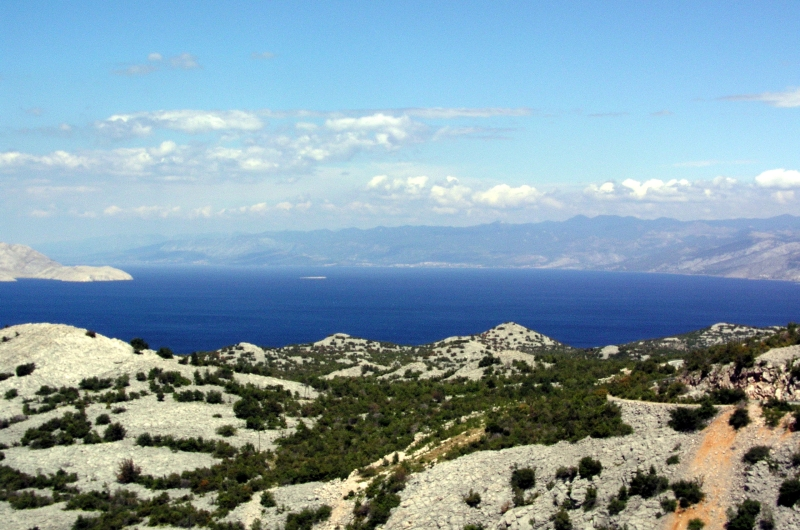
View of the Velebit Channel

The Velebit Channel (Croatian: Velebitski kanal (Note: Also Croatian: Podgorski kanal or Planinski kanal; Italian: Canale della Morlacca or Canale della Montagna.)) is a channel in Croatia located between the lands at the foot of the Velebit mountain range and the islands of Pag, Rab, Goli Otok, Prvić and Krk. It is about 121 kilometres (75 miles) long, with an average width of 3–4 km (1.9–2.5 mi) and up to 106 metres (348 feet) deep.

It is believed some Istro-Romanians crossed the Velebit Channel and settled in the western part of the island of Krk during the second half of the 15th century, forming a community on the island that would survive until 1875, when the last speaker of the Istro-Romanian dialect of Krk, defined by some Croatian scholars as "Krko-Romanian", died. One of the Italian names for the Velebit Channel, Canale della Morlacca ("Channel of the Morlach"), originates from these migrations.
