= La Melpomène-class torpedo boat =

Ship class

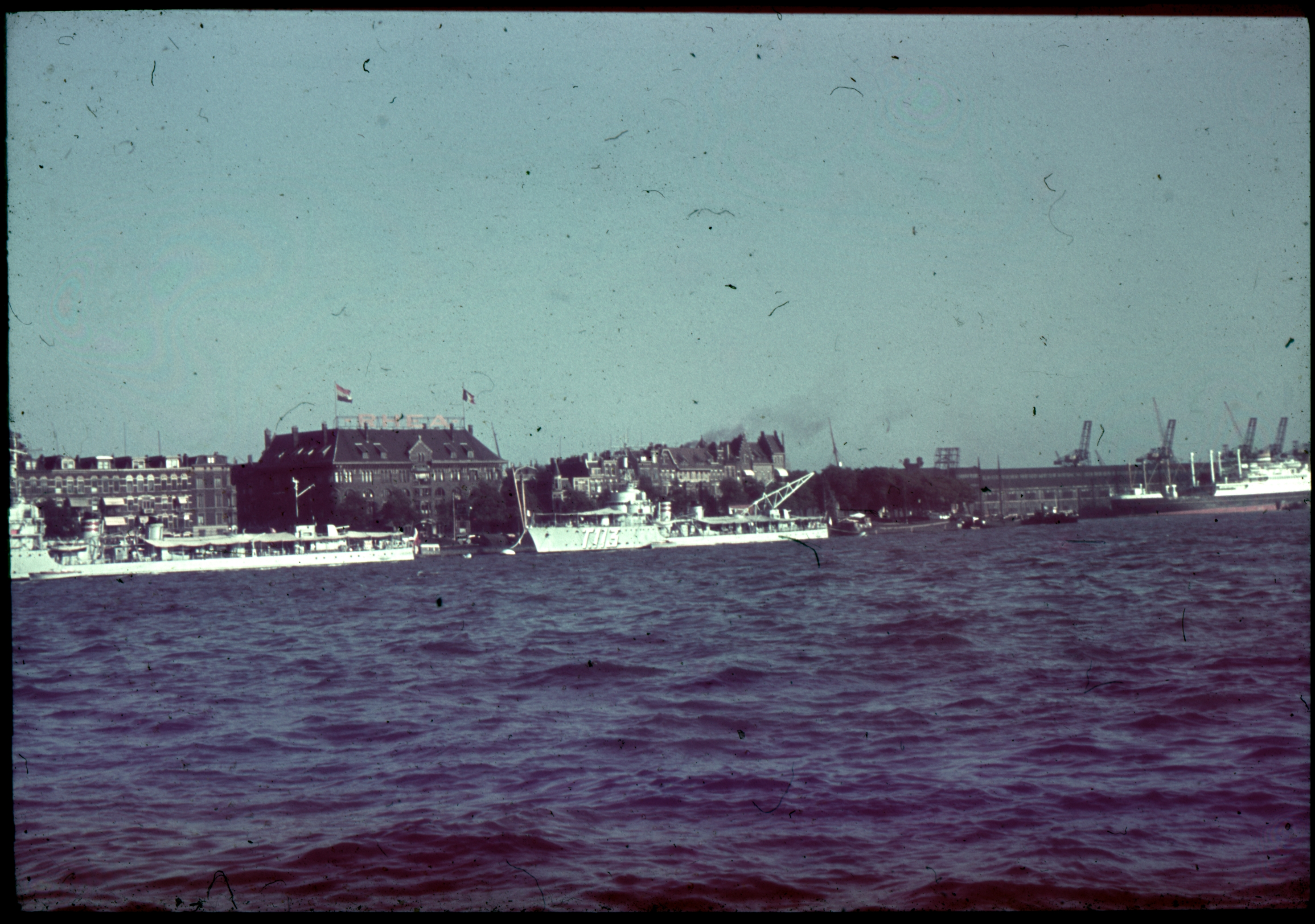
- Two La Melpomène-class torpedo boats in the New Maas in the Netherlands in 1939.

Class overview
- Name: La Melpomène class
- Operators: French Navy
- Preceded by: Mistral class
- Succeeded by: Le Fier class
- Completed: 12
- Lost: 6

General characteristics
- Type: Torpedo Boat
- Displacement: 610 tons standard, 834 tons full load
- Length: 80.7 m (264 ft 9 in) o.a.
- Beam: 7.96 m (26 ft 1 in)
- Draught: 3.07 m (10 ft 1 in)
- Installed power: 2 boilers; 22,000 shp (16,000 kW)
- Propulsion: Geared turbines, 2 shafts
- Speed: 34.5 knots (63.9 km/h; 39.7 mph)
- Complement: 5/8 officers, 94 men
- Armament: 2 × 100 mm (3.9 in)/40 caliber guns; 2 × 37 mm (1.5 in) AA guns; 2 × 13.2 mm (0.52 in) machine guns; 2 × 550 mm (21.7 in) torpedo tubes (1 x 2)

The La Melpomène class was a group of 12 French torpedo boats built from 1933 to 1935.

== Ships in class ==
After serving with Marine Nationale, the ships of the La Melpomène class saw service in World War II with the Kriegsmarine, Marine Nationale de l´Armistice (Vichy French Navy), Regia Marina, Free French Navy, Royal Navy and Royal Netherlands Navy.

Ship	Builder	Commissioned	Fate
La Melpomène	AC de Bretagne, Nantes	12 November 1936	Sold and scrapped 15.5.1950
La Pomone	AC de la Loire, Nantes	6 December 1936	see below
La Flore	AC de Bretagne, Nantes	17 November 1936	Sold and scrapped 31.8.1950
L'Iphigénie	AC de la Loire, Nantes	21 November 1936	see below
La Bayonnaise	C Maritimes du Sud Ouest, Bordeaux	7 April 1938	see below
Bombarde	AC de la Loire, Nantes	1 August 1938	see below
L'Incomprise	AC Seine Maritime, Le Trait	12 March 1938	see below
La Poursuivante	AC de France, Dunkirk	10 November 1937	see below
La Cordelière	AC Augustin-Normand, Le Havre	11 November 1937	see below
Branlebas	AC Augustin-Normand, Le Havre	10 March 1938	Foundered off Eddystone on 14 December 1940
Baliste	AC de France, Dunkirk	14 May 1938	see below
Bouclier	AC Seine Maritime, Le Trait	6 August 1938	see below

== Service histories ==
- La Melpomène was in a British port in June 1940. After brief service with the Royal Navy, she was transferred into FNFL (Free French) service. In 1950 was sold for scrap.
- La Pomone was in Vichy service after June 1940. Seized by the Germans at Bizerte, in December 1942, she became the Italian FR.42, and the German TA.10 in May 1943. In action against HMS Eclipse near Rhodes, she was badly damaged, and scuttled on 27 September 1943.
- La Flore on the night of 21 May 1940 at the invitation of Admiral Abrial, carried General Weygand, the recently installed supreme commander of French Forces, from Dunkirk via Dover to Cherbourg in order to reach Paris, having failed to meet up with Lord Gort, commander of the British Expeditionary Force. Flore had left Dunkirk harbour at full speed during a German air raid. She was in a British port in June 1940. She was transferred into FNFL (Free French) service. In 1950 was sold for scrap.
- L'Iphigénie was in Vichy service after June 1940. Seized by the Germans at Bizerte, in December 1942, she became the Italian FR.43, and the German TA.11 in May 43. She was sunk by Italian MAS motor torpedo boats at Piombino, 10 September 1943.
- La Bayonnaise was scuttled in Toulon on November 27, 1942, to avoid her capture. The ship was raised by the Italians and renamed FR.44. She was repaired, but was taken over by the Germans after the Italian armistice and were renamed TA.13. As TA.13 she was scuttled on 23 August 1944.
- Bombarde was in Vichy service after June 1940. She was seized by the Germans at Bizerte in December 1942, entering into Italian service as FR.41. However, she was once again captured by the Germans during the Italian armistice of September 1943, and were renamed TA.9. As TA.9 she was sunk by US aircraft off Toulon, 23 August 1944.
- L'Incomprise was seized by the British at Portsmouth after the Fall of France. She served with the Free French Forces. At the war's end she was decommissioned and sold for scrap in 1950.
- La Poursuivante was in Vichy service after June 1940. She was scuttled in Toulon on November 27, 1942, to avoid her capture, leaving her a total constructive loss.
- La Cordelière was seized by the British at Portsmouth on 3 July 1940; she was returned to serve with Free French Forces. At the war's end she was decommissioned and sold for scrap in 1950.
- Branlebas was seized by the British at Portsmouth on 3 July 1940; The Branlebas was retained by the Royal Navy but foundered 25 miles off Eddystone on 14 December 1940.
- Baliste was in Vichy service after June 1940. She was scuttled in Toulon on November 27, 1942, to avoid her capture. The ship was raised by the Italians and were renamed FR45. She was taken over by the Germans after the Italian armistice and was renamed TA.12. As TA.12 she was sunk by Allied aircraft on 22 August 1943.
- Bouclier was seized by the British at Portsmouth on 3 July 1940; She was first transferred to Royal Dutch Navy and renamed as HNLMS Bouclier, but was returned to Free French forces in January 1941. At the war's end she was decommissioned and sold for scrap in 1950.

== Bibliography ==
- Campbell, John (1985). Naval Weapons of World War II. Annapolis, Maryland: Naval Institute Press. ISBN 0-87021-459-4.
- Colledge, J. J.; Warlow, Ben & Bush, Steve (2020). Ships of the Royal Navy: The Complete Record of all Fighting Ships of the Royal Navy from the 15th Century to the Present (5th revised and updated ed.). Barnsley, UK: Seaforth Publishing. ISBN 978-1-5267-9327-0.
- Roberts, John (1980). "France". In Chesneau, Roger (ed.). Conway's All the World's Fighting Ships 1922–1946. New York: Mayflower Books. pp. 255–279. ISBN 0-8317-0303-2.
- Saibène, Marc (2004). Les torpilleurs légers français 1937-1945: les torpilleurs de 610 tonnes du type la Melpomène et les torpilleurs de 1010 tonnes du type le Fier [The French Light Torpedo Boats 1937-1945: The Torpedo Boats of the 610-tonne La Melpomène Class and the 1010-tonne Le Fier Class] (in French). Rennes, France: Marines. ISBN 2-9153-7913-0.
- Salou, Charles (2004). Les torpilleurs de 600 tW du type "la Melpomène": construits d'après les lois des finances 1931-1932 [The 600-tonne Torpedo Boats of the La Melpomene Class: Built According to the 1931-1932 Finance Laws]. Collection Navires et Histoire des marines du mond; 4 (in French). Outreau, France: Lela Presse. ISBN 2-914017-22-7.
- Whitley, M. J. (2000). Destroyers of World War Two: An International Encyclopedia. London: Cassell & Co. ISBN 1-85409-521-8.
