= Le Fier-class torpedo boat =

French Navy sea-going torpedo boats

Class overview
- Name: Le Fier class
- Builders: Ateliers et Chantiers de Bretagne, Nantes, Brittany; Ateliers et Chantiers de la Loire, Nantes, Brittany
- Operators: French Navy (1939–1940); Kriegsmarine (1940–1944)
- Preceded by: La Melpomène class
- Succeeded by: T 47 class
- Subclasses: L'Alsacien class; Torpedoboot Ausland 1 class
- Built: 1939–1944
- Planned: 14
- Completed: 0
- Cancelled: 7

General characteristics
- Type: Torpedo boat
- Displacement: 1,010 long tons (1,026 t) (standard)
- Length: 95 m (311 ft 8 in) o/a
- Beam: 9.4 m (30 ft 10 in)
- Draught: 3.25 m (10 ft 8 in)
- Installed power: 3 Indret boilers; 30,800 shp (23,000 kW)
- Propulsion: 2 shafts, 2 steam turbines
- Speed: 33 knots (61 km/h; 38 mph)
- Range: 1,000 nmi (1,900 km; 1,200 mi) at 20 knots (37 km/h; 23 mph)
- Complement: 7 officers, 129 sailors
- Armament: 2 × twin 100 mm (3.9 in)/45-calibre DP guns; 4 × single 37 mm (1.46 in) AA guns; 4 × twin 13.2 mm (0.52 in) machine guns; 2 × twin 550 mm (22 in) torpedo tubes

The Le Fier class was a series of sea-going torpedo boats built for the French Navy. Laid down in 1940, the ships were incomplete as of the fall of France and remained unfinished for the rest of World War II.

== Design and development ==
With rising tensions with Nazi Germany after their remilitarization of the Rhineland in 7 March 1936, the French Third Republic undertook a series of naval construction programmes to maintain military parity in the face of rapid German re-armament. On 31 December 1936, the French Parliament authorized the construction of more warships at the suggestion of Admiral François Darlan. Among them were four torpedo boats (torpilleur). Collectively this order was named Tranche 1937.

The four torpedo boats were to be named, Le Fier, L'Agile, L'Entreprenant, and Le Farouche and were also referred to as torpilleurs légers de 1010 in reference to their displacement in tons. Exactly one year after the 1937 tranche, on 31 December 1937 the chamber of deputies approved a second naval procurement order, named Tranche 1938. Three additional Le Fier-class torpedo boats, to be named Alsacien, Le Corse and Le Breton were ordered. On 2 May 1938, an additional tranche (Tranche 1938bis) was budgeted which included five more Le Fier-class torpedo boats, to be named Le Tunisien, Le Normand, Le Parisien, Le Provençal and Le Saintongeais. Lastly Tranche 1938ter was approved, with two more torpedo boats, Le Niçois and Le Savoyard.

The Le Fier class were based on an enlarged La Melpomène-class torpedo boat design with improved sea-going features. The class of ships had a standard displacement of 1,010 tons, a length of 90 m (295 ft 3 in) and an overall length of 95 m (311 ft 8 in). The ships breadth was 9.4 m (30.8 ft), draught was 3.25 m (10 ft 8 in) deep. Propulsion was provided by a two-shaft, twin steam turbines, and powered by three Indret boilers, producing 30,300 shaft horsepower (22,600 kW), and 30,800 shp (23,000 kW) at full power. Ships ordered under Tranche 1937 were to be powered by Rateau-Bretagne turbine engines while all subsequent ships, starting with L'Alsacien were to be powered by Parsons steam turbines. The Le Fier class had an unorthodox weapons arrangement, with all main guns, mounted aft, and anti-aircraft armament primarily mounted at the fore-end. The primary armament of Le Fier class were four, recently developed 100mm/45 Modèle 1933 dual-purpose guns, in two rear-facing 29.8 ton Contre-Avions Double Modèle 1937 gun turrets protected by 4 mm (0.2 in) plating. The 100 mm (3.9 in) Modèle 1933 was an improved variant of the earlier Modèle 1930 and were the first dual purpose guns mounted on a French navy ship. The secondary armament consisted of four single Canon de 37 mm Modèle 1925 anti-aircraft guns, and eight Hotchkiss M1929 machine guns in four, twin Contre-Avions Double Modèle 1929 mountings. Torpedo armament consisted of two, centreline double 550 mm (21.7 in) torpedo tubes.

Of all these French fourteen torpedo boats, none would ever be completed. After the surrender of France on 25 June 1940, all work on the Le Fier-class torpedo boats was halted.

== German service ==
In June 1940, the German army seized all shipyards from the new collaborationist Vichy France government including the Le Fier-class torpedo boats still under construction. These were Le Fier, L'Agile, L'Entreprenant, Le Farouche, L'Alsacien, and Le Corse. Le Breton, which was the least complete of the ships, was scrapped and the seven unbuilt ships were cancelled. The remaining torpedo boats were transferred to the Kriegsmarine and renamed TA1-TA6 (Torpedoboot Ausland) and were to be completed for the Germans with revised specifications.

Displacement would increase to 1,087 tons, with a full displacement 1,443 tons. At the same time the dimensions were to shrunk. The overall length would be reduced to 93.2 m (305 ft 9 in), the breadth would be reduced 9.28 m (30 ft 5 in) and the draught reduced to 3.08 m (10 ft 1 in). While the engines and propulsion would remain, full power was to be reduced to 28,000 brake horsepower (20,900 kW). The ships would be rearmed with German weapons. The four 100 mm dual-purpose guns would be replaced by three, single mounted 10.5 cm SK C/32 naval guns. The secondary guns would consist of two 3.7 cm SK C/30 guns, and nine 2 cm SK c/38 guns. Four in one quad-mount, and five single mounts. The torpedo armament consisted of six centreline 533 mm (21.0 in) torpedo tubes, in two triple launchers.

While work on the torpedo boats continued under German supervision, a shortage of materials and sabotage by French workers hampered progress of the ships, even though before the surrender several of the ships were near completion. Eventually in April 1943, due to a lack of general progress, it was decided that only TA1 and TA4 would be completed and the rest were to be cannibalized to finish the remaining two ships. Delays continued as TA2 and TA4 were sunk by United States Army Air Forces, but refloated, again. The Normandy landings on 6 June 1944 led to a German withdrawal from Nantes and the remaining ships were purposely scuttled by the Germans or were sunk, incomplete, on 11 August 1944.

The Germans assisted Spain in the design and construction of the Audaz-class destroyers using captured plans and documents from the Le Fier class.

== Ships ==
Name	Builder	Laid down	Launched	Completed	Notes	Fate
Le Fier group
Tranche 1937
Le Fier	Ateliers et Chantiers de Bretagne	January 1939	12 March 1940	—N/a	Sunk during attempted crossing of the English Channel on 22 June 1940, refloated by Germany, renamed TA1	Scuttled at Nantes on 11 August 1944
L'Agile	Ateliers et Chantiers de Bretagne	April 1939	23 May 1940	—N/a	Captured by Germany on 22 June 1940, renamed TA2	Sunk by American bombers on 14 September 1943, refloated, sunk by American bombers on 11 August 1944
L'Entreprenant	Ateliers et Chantiers de la Loire	January 1939	25 May 1940	—N/a	Scuttled on 22 June 1940, refloated by Germany, renamed TA4	Sunk by American bombers on 14 September 1943, refloated, sunk by American bombers on 11 August 1944
Le Farouche	Ateliers et Chantiers de la Loire	April 1939	19 October 1940	—N/a	Captured by Germany on 22 June 1940, renamed TA5	Sunk at Nantes on 11 August 1944
L'Alsacien group
Tranche 1938
L'Alsacien	Ateliers et Chantiers de la Loire	April 1939	1942	—N/a	Captured by Germany on 22 June 1940, renamed TA3	Destroyed by Allied aircraft March 1944
Le Corse	Ateliers et Chantiers de la Loire	January 1940	4 April 1942	—N/a	Captured by Germany on 22 June 1940, renamed TA6	Sunk at Nantes on 11 August 1944
Le Breton	Ateliers et Chantiers de la Loire	January 1940	—N/a	—N/a	Captured by Germany on 22 June 1940	Scrapped June 1940
Tranche 1938bis
Le Flamand > Le Tunisien	Ateliers et Chantiers de la Loire	—N/a				Cancelled June 1940
Le Normand	Ateliers et Chantiers de la Loire	—N/a				Cancelled June 1940
Le Parisien	Ateliers et Chantiers de la Loire	—N/a				Cancelled June 1940
Le Provençal	Ateliers et Chantiers de la Loire	—N/a				Cancelled June 1940
Le Saintongeais	Ateliers et Chantiers de Saint-Nazaire Penhoët	—N/a				Cancelled June 1940
Tranche 1938ter
Le Niçois	Forges et Chantiers de la Méditerranée	—N/a				Cancelled June 1940
Le Savoyard	Forges et Chantiers de la Méditerranée	—N/a				Cancelled June 1940

== Bibliography ==
- Campbell, John (1985). Naval Weapons of World War II. Annapolis, Maryland: Naval Institute Press. ISBN 0-87021-459-4.
- Jordan, John & Moulin, Jean (2015). French Destroyers: Torpilleurs d'Escadre & Contre-Torpilleurs 1922–1956. Barnsley, UK: Seaforth Publishing. ISBN 978-1-84832-198-4.
- Roberts, John (1980). "France". In Chesneau, Roger (ed.). Conway's All the World's Fighting Ships 1922–1946. New York: Mayflower Books. pp. 255–279. ISBN 0-8317-0303-2.
- Saibène, Marc (2004). Les torpilleurs légers français 1937-1945: les torpilleurs de 610 tonnes du type la Melpomène et les torpilleurs de 1010 tonnes du type le Fier [The French Light Torpedo Boats 1937-1945: The Torpedo Boats of the 610-tonne La Melpomène Class and the 1010-tonne Le Fier Class] (in French). Rennes, France: Marines. ISBN 2-9153-7913-0.
- Whitley, M. J. (2000). Destroyers of World War Two: An International Encyclopedia. London: Cassell & Co. ISBN 1-85409-521-8.
