= Generali-class destroyer =

Destroyer class Warship of the Italian Navy

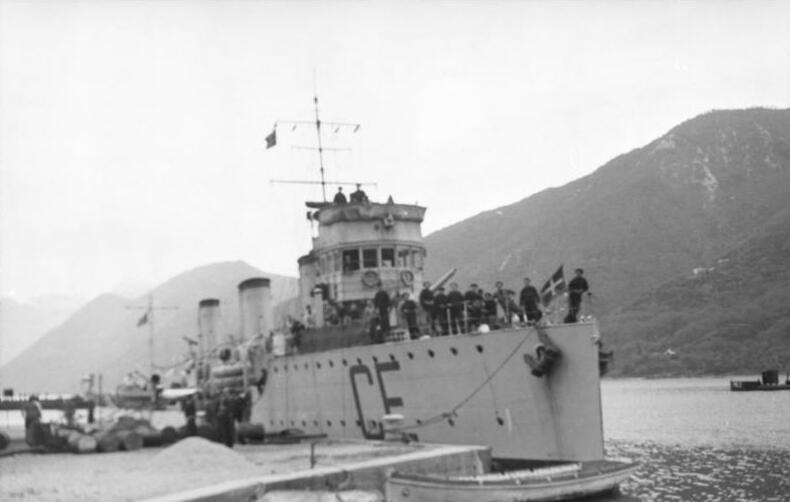
- Generale Antonio Cantore photographed in 1941 in Kotor following the Axis invasion of Yugoslavia.

Class overview
- Name: Generali class
- Builders: Cantieri navali Odero
- Operators: Regia Marina; Kriegsmarine
- Preceded by: Rosolino Pilo class
- Succeeded by: Curtatone class
- Planned: 6
- Completed: 6
- Lost: 6

General characteristics
- Type: Destroyer
- Displacement: 832 tons (normal); 890 tons (full load)
- Length: 73.2 m (240 ft 2 in)
- Beam: 7.3 m (23 ft 11 in)
- Draught: 3 m (9 ft 10 in)
- Installed power: 16,000 hp (12,000 kW)
- Propulsion: 4 boilers and 2 turbines, 2 axes
- Speed: 30 knots (56 km/h)
- Range: 2,000 nautical miles (3,700 km) at 14 kn (26 km/h)
- Complement: 105
- Armament: 3 × 102 mm (4 in)/45 guns; 2 × 76 mm (3.0 in) L30 guns; 4 450 mm (18 in) torpedo launchers

The Generali-class destroyer was a class of Italian destroyers, built as a development of the Rosolino Pilo-class destroyer. They were the last ships of the Regia Marina (Italian Navy) fitted with three stacks. In 1929, being obsolete, the units were reclassified as torpedo boats, and in this role served during Second World War.

== Origins ==
The class was built between 1921 and 1924, ordered from Cantieri navali Odero, Sestri Ponente. The ships were able to reach 30 knots (56 km/h; 35 mph) of top speed, an improvement respect the previous class Rosolino Pilo. Their displacement was 832 tons (normal) and 890 tons (full load). Their armament initially was composed of three 102-millimetre (4 in)/45 calibre guns (an Italian version of the QF 4 inch Mk V) and two 76 mm (3.0 in) L30 guns, and four 450 mm (18 in) torpedo launchers. In 1936 ships were enabled with minesweeping equipment, and the 76 mm guns were replaced by twin cannons Breda Model 35.

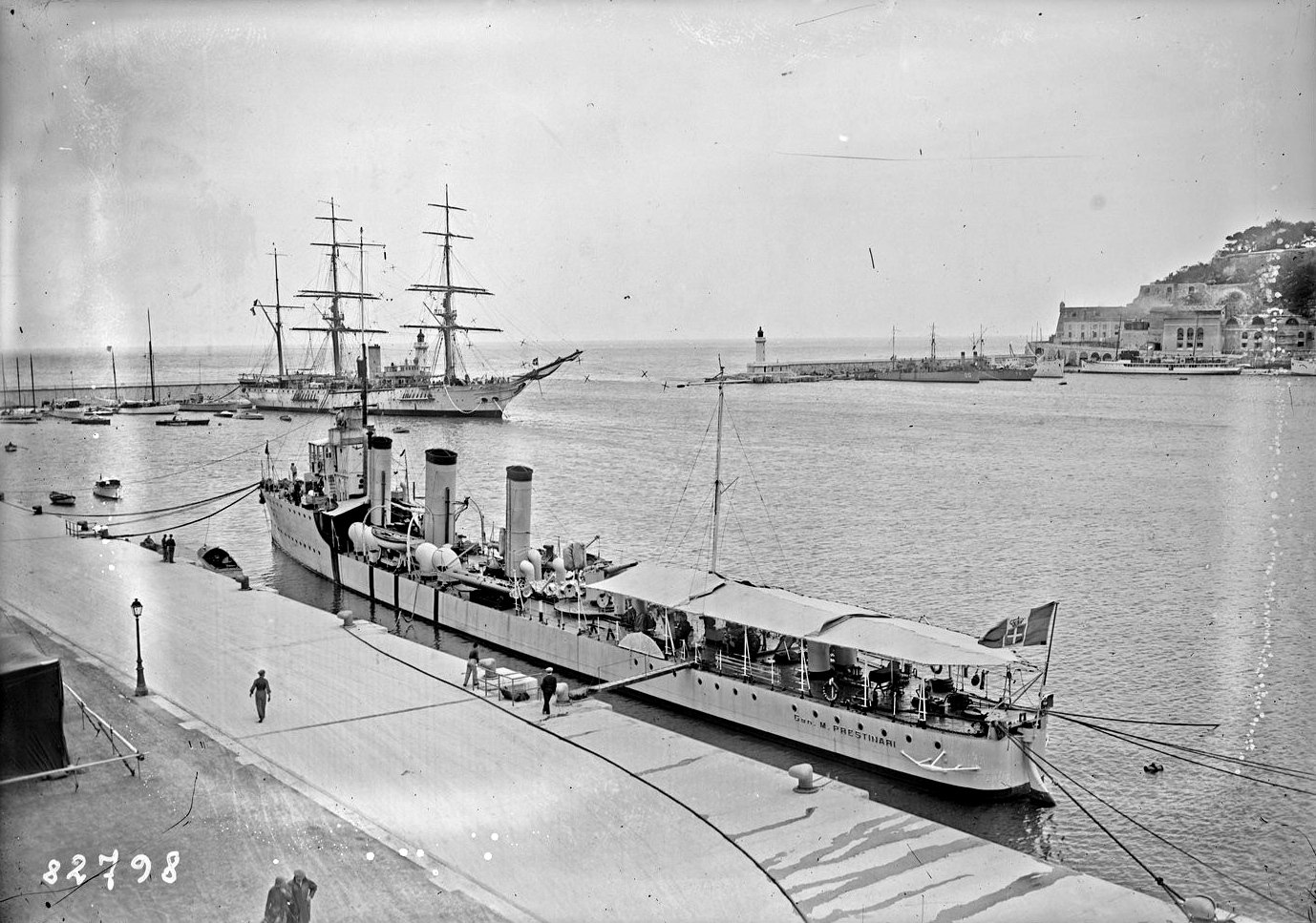
Generale Marcello Prestinari - 1923

== Units ==
The class was known also by name of his first unit, Generale Antonio Cantore. All other ships were dedicated to Italian generals. All ships were built by Cantieri navali Odero at Sestri Ponente. None of them survived the war.

Ship	Launched	Fate
Generale Antonio Cantore	23 April 1921	Sunk by a mine off Ras el Tin Libya, 22 August 1942
Generale Antonio Cascino	18 March 1922	Scuttled 9 September 1943
Generale Antonio Chinotto	7 Aug 1921	Sunk by mines off Palermo, 28 March 1941
Generale Carlo Montanari	4 October 1922	Captured by the Germans, scuttled 25 April 1944
Generale Marcello Prestinari	4 July 1922	Sunk by a mine near Sicily, 31 January 1943
Generale Achille Papa	8 December 1921	Captured by the Germans, sunk 25 April 1945

== Bibliography ==
- Fraccaroli, Aldo (1985). "Italy". In Gray, Randal (ed.). Conway's All the World's Fighting Ships 1906–1921. Annapolis: Naval Institute Press. pp. 252–290. ISBN 978-0-87021-907-8.
