= HMS Lookout (G32) =

Destroyer of the Royal Navy

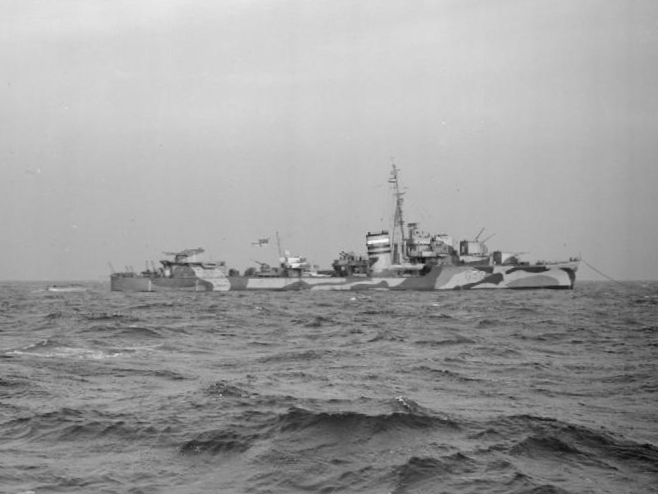
- Lookout at Greenock, 21 January 1942

History

United Kingdom
- Name: HMS Lookout
- Ordered: 31 March 1938
- Builder: Scotts Shipbuilding and Engineering Company, Greenock
- Laid down: 23 November 1938
- Launched: 4 November 1940
- Commissioned: 30 January 1942
- Identification: Pennant number: G32
- Honours and awards: Diego Suarez 1942; Malta Convoys 1942; Arctic 1942; North Africa 1942–43; Sicily 1943; Salerno 1943; South France 1944; Mediterranean 1943–45
- Fate: Sold for scrapping, 6 January 1948
- Badge: On a Field per fess wavy White and Blue, a man in crow's nest of Whaler, all proper.

General characteristics
- Class & type: L-class destroyer
- Displacement: 1,920 tons
- Length: 362.5 ft (110.5 m)
- Beam: 36.7 ft (11.2 m)
- Draught: 10 ft (3.0 m)
- Propulsion: Two shafts; Two geared steam turbines; Two drum type boilers; 48000 shp (35.8 MW)
- Speed: 36 knots (67 km/h)
- Range: 5,500 nautical miles (10,200 km) at 15 kn (28 km/h)
- Complement: 221
- Armament: Original configuration: 3 × 2 – QF 4.7-inch Mk XI dual purpose guns; 1 × 1 – QF 4-inch Mk V anti-aircraft gun; 1 × 4 – QF 2-pounder Mk VIII anti-aircraft guns; 2 × 4 – QF .5-inch Vickers Mk III anti-aircraft machine guns; 2 × 4 – 21-inch (530 mm) torpedo tubes

HMS Lookout was an L-class destroyer of the Royal Navy. She was launched on 4 November 1940 and broken up in 1948. She was one of only two L-class destroyers to survive the Second World War, the other being Loyal.

Ordered under the 1937 Programme, Scotts Shipbuilding and Engineering Company were awarded the contract to build her. She would be the second Royal Navy ship to bear the name Lookout. Build was completed on 30 January 1942 and the tender cost was £440,204 which excluded items such as weapons and communications equipment supplied by the Admiralty.

After a successful Warship Week National Savings campaign in January 1942, HMS Lookout was adopted by the civil community of Burnley, Lancashire.

== Operational history ==
=== Sea Trials ===
Lookout's sea trials were generally satisfactory, but were rather protracted through no fault of the ship. On 18 January 1942 Lookout underwent her gunnery trials which were entirely satisfactory. Gun mountings 'B' and 'X' lost two cartridge cases overboard when firing abeam, but this did not affect the outcome of the trial. The next day Lookout carried out her preliminary full power trial at a mean displacement of 2,320 tons. Her first attempt at a four-hour full-power trial was carried out on 21 January 1942 but was abandoned due to bad weather conditions. Her next attempt at the trial was a success. On 20 January Lookout finally carried out the trial in a Force 6 wind. Her mean displacement was 2,625 tons with a mean power of 48,442 SHP, giving a mean speed of 32.098 knots (59.445 km/h).

=== Arctic Convoys ===
Lookout was with the Home Fleet in March 1942 when the German battleship Tirpitz made ineffective attempts to intercept Arctic convoys (Operation Sportpalast). One of Lookout's first operations took place on 4–7 March, when she was part escort to a battle squadron which included Renown, King George V and Duke of York. The battle squadron sailed to cover against any move by Tirpitz to intercept Russian convoys QP8 and PQ12. Tirpitz was out at sea during this time but failed to locate the convoys due to bad weather conditions. A straggler from PQ12 was however sunk by Friedrich Ihn, a destroyer who was screening Tirpitz.

=== Operation Ironclad ===
Lookout participated in the allied occupation of Madagascar. She joined her sister ships Lightning and Laforey at Durban on 22 April 1942 and they departed on 28 April 1942, en route for Diego Suarez (now Antsiranana), with invasion transports and escort. On 7 May the three L-class destroyers escorted the battleship Ramillies to search for an enemy battleship and cruisers. None were found, but Laforey sank an enemy submarine.

=== Operation Pedestal ===
In August 1942, Lookout was escorting the aircraft carrier Eagle when Eagle was torpedoed on 11 August and sunk. Lookout carried out an unsuccessful counterattack with Charybdis and then helped rescue the 927 survivors. Lookout later transferred 500 of the survivors to Venomous. The next day Lookout joined Tartar in an attack on an enemy submarine which they had sighted on the surface, but no kill was made. Lookout was then detached with Charybdis, Somali and Lightning to assist the aircraft carrier Indomitable after she had been hit by dive bombers.

Shortly after Operation Pedestal, Lt.Cdr. Cecil Powis Frobisher Brown relinquished command of Lookout and was relieved by Lt.Cdr. Archibald George Forman. He was later promoted to commander while in command of Lookout.

During her second patrol after Operation Pedestal, Lookout encountered a merchant ship which was identified as Luarana, an Italian vessel of about 4,000 tons. Lookout went to action stations but the vessel was found to have been abandoned and so a skeleton crew was put on board to examine her. Eventually the stokers managed to raise steam on her and Lookout escorted Luarana to Gibraltar.

Having spent much of August and most of September 1942 operating out of Gibraltar, Lookout returned home as escort to the battleship Malaya, departing from Gibraltar on 30 September and arriving on the Clyde on 5 October before departing the next day for Rosyth where she arrived on 8 October. She then sailed north to Scapa Flow, arriving there on 9 October.

Lookout then left Scapa Flow on 23 October for Gibraltar as part escort to battleship Rodney, arriving on 29 October at which time she rejoined the 19th Destroyer Flotilla.

=== Operation Retribution ===
In May 1943 Lookout took part in Operation Retribution and sailed from Bone with Eskimo and the hunts of the 57 Division, departing on 9 May. On their way up the swept channel they were bombed by Ju 88s, but suffered no damage. The next morning the ships sighted the Italian hospital ship Virgiglio and Lauderdale was ordered to escort her to waters of Cape Carthage to examine her. The boarding party later reported that everything was as it should be and the Italian ship was released.

On 13 May Lookout sighted a small boat 10 miles north-east of Plane Island. Thirteen Germans and one Italian were captured. On 22 May Lookout made radar contact with Italian auxiliary transport Stella Maris. Lookout fired 24 rounds of 4.7 inch and along with Laforey, successfully sank the Italian vessel. Lookout then covered Laforey as she picked up survivors.

=== Operation Corkscrew ===
On 8 and 9 June Lookout was involved in Operation Corkscrew. It was during this operation that Lookout achieved the distinction of probably being the most heavily bombed destroyer to survive the war. The 19 Destroyer Flotilla, which included Lookout, bombarded a shore position. But soon white flags could be seen hanging out of windows and troops eventually landed with no resistance.

As dusk approached, the other ships withdrew leaving Lookout patrolling the island as guard ship. When the other ships were about 10 miles away, the Luftwaffe appeared expecting to find an invasion fleet, but only found the destroyer Lookout. Lookout went to action stations and put up an anti aircraft barrage and took violent evasive action. By this time however her gunnery was impaired by the failing light. Despite many close misses from bombs, Lookout remained undamaged and after the bombers had moved on, Lookout continued to patrol.

Lookout supported the allied landings at Salerno (Operation Avalanche) in September 1943, shelling German gun positions in support of 56th (London) Infantry Division. A few days later she was nearly hit by a glider bomb but sustained little damage and was able to continue bombardments in support of the army until 15 September, when she sailed back to Malta for repairs.

=== Late war service ===
After a major refit beginning on 13 November 1943, Lookout returned to service on 23 July 1944 under the command of Lt.Cdr. Derick Hetherington. She was assigned to the 14 Destroyer Flotilla. On 12 October Loyal was severely damaged by a mine. Lookout towed her home.

In mid-August 1944 HMS Lookout was assigned to the Gunfire Support Group for the Sitka Naval Forces as part of Operation Dragoon, the invasion of Southern France.

At the beginning of 1945, Lookout was transferred to the 3 Destroyer Flotilla. On 15 January she bombarded targets in San Remo. On the 18 and 19 she bombarded targets near the Franco-Italian border.

On 18 March 1945, Lookout participated in the Battle of the Ligurian Sea, sinking the German torpedo boat TA29.

Lookout remained on bombardment and escort duties of the west coast of Italy until Victory Europe day.

== Reserve status and Demolition ==
Lookout took passage from Gibraltar to Plymouth on 19 October 1945 to be paid off and reduced to Reserve status. The ship was laid up in Reserve at Devonport and in October 1947 placed on the Disposal List. Sold to BISCO in January 1948, she was taken in tow to Newport, Monmouthshire for demolition by John Cashmore and arrived at the breaker's yard on 29 February that year.

Burnley Sea Cadets lounge is named the Lookout Lounge in memory of the ship and her crew. The Greenock Museum in Scotland has a model of Lookout (G32).
