= Italian aircraft carrier Aquila =

Italian aircraft carrier

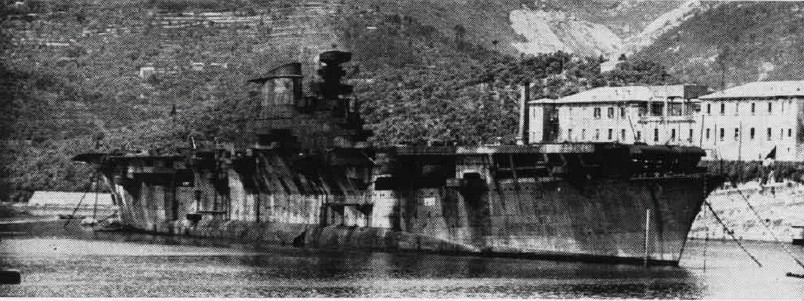
- RN Aquila at La Spezia in 1951, just before being scrapped

History

Italy
- Name: 1941–1949 Aquila; 1949–1952 Pontone P227
- Ordered: 1941
- Builder: Ansaldo, Sestri-Ponente shipyard, Genoa
- Refit: Rebuild began in 1941 but was halted due to the Italian armistice in 1943
- Fate: Seized by Germany and the Italian Social Republic in 1943. Sabotaged and partially sunk by Italian royalist Co-Belligerent commandos to prevent its use as a block ship in 1945. Raised after the war and demolished by 1952

General characteristics
- Type: Aircraft carrier
- Displacement: 23,500 long tons (23,877 t) (standard); 27,800 long tons (28,246 t) (full load)
- Length: 235.5 m (772 ft 8 in)
- Beam: 30 m (98 ft 5 in)
- Draft: 7.3 m (23 ft 11 in)
- Installed power: 151,000 shp (113,000 kW)
- Propulsion: 4 × geared steam turbines; 8 × boilers; 4 × shafts
- Speed: 30 kn (56 km/h; 35 mph)
- Range: 5,500 nmi (10,200 km; 6,300 mi) at 18 kn (33 km/h; 21 mph)
- Complement: 1,420 (107 officers)
- Armament: 8 × 135 mm (5.3 in) /45 cal guns; 12 × 65 mm (2.56 in)/64 cal guns; 132 × 20 mm (0.79 in) Breda 20/65 mod.35 AA guns
- Armor: Deck: 8 cm (3.1 in)
- Aircraft carried: 51

Aquila (Italian for "Eagle") was an Italian aircraft carrier converted from the transatlantic passenger liner SS Roma. During World War II, work on Aquila began in late 1941 at the Ansaldo shipyard in Genoa and continued for the next two years. With the signing of the Italian armistice on 8 September 1943, however, all work was halted and the vessel remained unfinished. She was captured by the National Republican Navy of the Italian Social Republic and the German occupation forces in 1943, but in 1945 she was partially sunk by a commando attack of Mariassalto, an Italian royalist assault unit of the Co-Belligerent Navy of the Kingdom of Italy, made up by members of the former Decima Flottiglia MAS. Aquila was refloated and scrapped in 1952.

== Background ==
Aquila was Italy's first proper aircraft carrier project; it was not built from the keel up as such, and was never completed. Following World War I, the Italian Royal Navy (Regia Marina) began exploring the use of ship-borne aircraft by converting the merchant ship Città di Messina into the twin-catapult-equipped seaplane tender Giuseppe Miraglia. Commissioned in 1927, the ship could carry as many as four large and 16 medium seaplanes and was primarily used as an experimental catapult ship for most of her career. By 1940, she was designated an aircraft transport/training ship and functioned as a seaplane tender for Italian capital ships.

Throughout the 1920s and 1930s, Italian military and political circles vigorously debated the role and necessity of aircraft carriers in the expanding Italian fleet. Gino Ducci (Regia Marina chief of staff in the early 1920s), Romeo Bernotti (assistant chief of staff) and naval officer Giuseppe Fioravanzo all championed development of a fleet air arm, the building of aircraft carriers and consolidation of the air and naval academies. Other factions opposed these ideas, especially carrier construction, not so much on the grounds of military usefulness, but rather on cost and practicality. More than anything else, Italy's limited industrial capacity, inadequate shipyard space and lack of financial capital prevented her from building the kind of well-balanced fleet envisioned by her naval theorists. Priority went to those ships deemed most necessary in a future conflict.

Since France was considered Italy's most likely foe in another European war, keeping parity with her navy became a paramount concern. Between 1932 and 1937, the French Navy laid down four new capital ships: Dunkerque, Strasbourg, Richelieu and Jean Bart. This development caused dictator Benito Mussolini and the Italian Admiralty to scrap any plans for carrier construction. Instead, Italy modernized four older battleships (Cavour and Cesare in 1933, Doria and Duilio between 1937 and 1940), and began the construction of four new ones (Vittorio Veneto and Littorio in 1934, and later the Roma and Impero in 1938).

Because the Regia Marina was expected to operate primarily in the relatively narrow confines of the Mediterranean and not on the world's oceans, the navy's lack of a fleet air arm seemed a tolerable omission (especially given that carriers were an expensive and unproven commodity at the time). The Italian mainland and islands such as Pantelleria and Sicily were viewed as natural aircraft carriers, whose many airbases, operated by the Italian Air Force (Regia Aeronautica), could provide adequate fleet air coverage when requested by the navy.

Nevertheless, in June 1940, shortly after Italy's entry into the war, Mussolini sanctioned the preliminary project for a conversion of the 30,800 long tons (31,294 t), 21 kn (39 km/h; 24 mph) ocean liner Roma into an auxiliary carrier, featuring a flush deck and a small hangar. On 7 January 1941, less than two months after the successful British carrier raid on Taranto, Mussolini authorized the development of a much more ambitious and extensive conversion of Roma into a full fleet carrier, capable of operating a larger air group and of keeping pace with the Regia Marina′s faster battleships and heavy cruisers.

By 27 January, however, the order was just as quickly rescinded following numerous objections from the Regia Marina. These included excessive cost; technical obstacles involving development of catapults, arrester gear and elevators; an estimated two-year development time for folding-wing aircraft; the time needed for studying the effects of air turbulence over the flight deck from an island superstructure; problems the Germans were encountering in the construction of their own aircraft carrier, Graf Zeppelin; and recent accounts of the heavy damage inflicted by German dive bombers on the British carrier Illustrious, graphically demonstrating the vulnerability of carriers operating in the Mediterranean.

Then, on 21 June, three months after losing three heavy cruisers off Cape Matapan, a loss potentially preventable had the Italians possessed their own aircraft carrier, the Regia Marina and Regia Aeronautica finally agreed to proceed with Roma′s conversion.

== Design and construction ==
Work on converting Roma into an aircraft carrier began in earnest at Cantieri Ansaldo, Genoa, in November 1941. Since a battleship named Roma was already under construction, the ship's name was changed to Aquila.

=== Hull ===
The liner's interior was completely gutted to allow for replacement of the original machinery and the addition of a hangar deck and workshops. Deep bulges were added to either side of the hull to improve stability, hull form, and provide a modest degree of torpedo defense. A layer of reinforced concrete—4–8 cm (1.6–3.1 in) thick—was applied inboard of the bulges for splinter protection. The hull was also lengthened to take advantage of the increased power of Aquila′s new machinery, and the bow flare increased to increase seaworthiness and provide additional space for air requirements. In order to improve resistance to underwater damage, the ship was heavily subdivided with 18 watertight bulkheads extending up to 'C' or 'D' deck, 11 of which were double.

The designers worked in 60–80 mm (2.4–3.1 in) of armor over the magazines and aviation fuel tanks. The fuel tanks copied British practice and consisted of cylinders or coffer dams separated from the ship's hull by water-filled compartments. This was a safety measure intended to prevent fracturing of the fuel system and the inadvertent spread of volatile AvGas fumes due to severe vibration or "whip" from bomb hits, near misses and torpedo hits. 30 mm (1.2 in) armor was applied on external plating to protect the steering gears.

=== Machinery ===
Before the war, it had already been planned to replace Roma's old steam turbines with four new FIAT 6512 D Diesel engines, capable of 20,000 hp each. These were built in 1939 and were some of the largest internal combustion engines ever produced. However, due to the outbreak of war, they were never installed on Roma. The four engines survived the conflict and after the war, they were reused as pairs of two on the twin ocean liners.

Self-propulsion tests at the Freude tank at La Spezia in January 1942 indicated that for a trial displacement of 26,700 tons, a speed of 29 knots could be achieved with 132,660 shp. This indicated that a sustained speed of 29.5 knots could be reached with an output of 140,000 shp, and 30 knots if the propulsion system could develop 151,000 shp without being forced.

Aquila′s new propulsion system was taken from two canceled Capitani Romani-class light cruisers (Cornelio Silla and Paolo Emilio), as despite their cancellation the fabrication of their propulsion systems was in an advanced stage. Totaling eight boilers and four turbine groups, each of these was capable of generating 55,000 shp at 310 rpm, more than adequate for the needs of Aquila. Each boiler operated at a pressure of 29 kg/cm^{2} (410 psi), with the superheated steam being fed to the turbines at a pressure of 26 kg/cm^{2} (370 psi) and a temperature of 320 °C (608 °F). As installed on Aquila, the overall output in shaft horsepower was reduced, to a maximum of 37,750 shp per turbine group at full normal power. The propellers used were also modified to a type more suitable for a larger ship - whereas the original propellers used by the Capitani Romani-class had three blades and a diameter of 4.2 m (14 ft), those used by Aquila had four blades and a diameter of 3.9 m (13 ft).

In order to increase survivability, the propulsion systems were grouped into four engine rooms, each with one turbine group and two boilers - a similar solution to what the Americans adopted for the North Carolina-class battleships. This solution made it possible to simplify piping of all kinds (steam, water, oil, etc.), ventilation systems, improve living conditions for the crew, and enhance ease of supervision and maintenance. Each room was separated from adjacent spaces by double watertight bulkheads, which increased structural strength and reduced the possibility of a single torpedo hit disabling two engine rooms at a time.

The system as a whole was capable of generating 151,000 shp (113,000 kW), and Aquila was expected to reach 30 kn (56 km/h; 35 mph) on trials and 29.5 kn (54.6 km/h; 33.9 mph) when fully laden. At a displacement of 27,800 tons, maximum fuel supply was 2,800 tons, and operational range 4,150 nmi at 18 kn and 1,210 nmi at 29 kn. With maximum fuel load, 3,660 tons, Aquila would displace 28,800 tons, with a range of 5,500 nmi at 18 kn and 1,580 nmi at 29 kn.

=== Hangar ===
Aquila had a hangar with a total length of 160 m (520 ft), a width of 18 m (59 ft), and height of 5.5 m (18 ft). This space was divided into four sections by five fire doors, section length from fore to aft being 32, 25, 25, and 35 meters. Hangar floor capacity was 26 aircraft for the Re.2001 OR Serie II, with seven in the 32-35 meter sections and six in the 25 meter sections. Additionally, fifteen aircraft could be suspended from the hangar ceiling. A planned folding-wing version of the aircraft was to have allowed the stowage of sixty-six aircraft in the hangar.

=== Flight deck ===
Aquila had a single continuous 211.6 m × 25.2 m (694 ft 3 in × 82 ft 8 in) flight deck. It was partially armored with 7.6 cm (3.0 in) plate over the gasoline bunkers and magazines. The flight deck ended short of the bows but overhung the stern, where it featured a pronounced round-down to improve air flow. Two 50 ft (15 m) octagonal lifts with a 5 short tons (4.5 t) capacity enabled transfer of aircraft between the hangar deck and flight deck. One was directly amidships and the second another 90 ft (27 m) forward, thus placing them far enough from the aft arrester wires that both could be used for striking down aircraft into the hangar immediately after a landing.

Two German-supplied Demag compressed air-driven catapults, each capable of launching one aircraft every 30 seconds, were installed parallel to each other at the forward end of the flight deck. These were originally intended for Germany's own "Carrier B", Graf Zeppelin′s incomplete—and eventually scrapped—sister ship. The Italians obtained them—along with five sets of arrester gear and other component plans—during a naval technical mission to Germany in October–November 1941.

A set of rails led aft from the catapults to the elevators and into the hangars. For catapult-assisted launches, aircraft would be hoisted in the hangar onto a portable collapsible catapult carriage, raised on the elevators to flight deck level and then trundled forward on the rails to the catapult starting positions, the same system as employed on Graf Zeppelin.

Aquila′s engines and catapults were successfully tested in August 1943 but the arresting gear installed on the carrier, consisting of four cables, initially failed to work properly. This would have prevented aircraft, once launched, from landing back on board. It was therefore proposed that aircraft taking off from Aquila would, after performing their mission, fly back to the nearest land-based airfield or simply ditch in the sea, a serious and embarrassing limitation on her capabilities as a fleet carrier. Italian and German technicians labored for months at the Perugia Sant'Egidio airfield on a mock-up of Aquila's flight deck and by March 1943 the heavily modified arresting gear was deemed usable. A postwar US Navy evaluation concluded, however, that the arrangement would have made landings exceedingly hazardous, especially given the absence of a crash barrier.

Aquila′s starboard-side island contained a single large vertical funnel for carrying exhaust gases clear of the flight deck. It also included a tall command tower and the fire control directors for the 135 mm (5.3 in) guns.

=== Anti-aircraft armament ===
Six 6-barrelled 20 mm (0.79 in) Breda Model 35 65 caliber anti-aircraft (AA) autocannons were positioned just fore and aft on the island. In addition, Aquila carried eight 135 mm (5.3 in)/45 cal guns taken from one of the canceled Capitani Romani-class cruisers. Though not designed as dual purpose weapons, these guns had an elevation of 45° and were therefore capable of providing a useful barrage against attacking enemy aircraft (by comparison, Italy's best heavy AA gun—the 90 mm (3.5 in) 50 cal — had an elevation of 85°). It was intended to mount 12 newly designed 65 mm (2.56 in) AA guns on sponsons just below flight deck level (six on either side of the hull). However, this gun — with an automatic feeder and 20 rpm rate of fire — never got beyond prototype stage. An additional 16 six-barrelled 20 mm cannons — also mounted below the flight deck — rounded out the ship's AA defense.

=== Aircraft ===
Throughout 1942 and 1943, trials were conducted at Perugia and Guidonia—the Regia Aeronautica′s equivalent to the German Luftwaffe′s test facility at Rechlin—to find aircraft suitable for conversion to carrier use. The Italians selected the SAIMAN 200, Fiat G.50/B and Reggiane Re.2001 OR Serie II as potential candidates.

In March 1943, German engineers and instructors with experience on Graf Zeppelin arrived to advise on aircraft testing and to help train future carrier pilots culled from 160 Gruppo C.T. of the Regia Aeronautica. They brought with them examples of a Junkers Ju 87C Stuka dive bomber (a navalized version with folding wings, arrester hook and catapult attachment points) and an Arado Ar 96B single-engine trainer. After conducting comparative flight trials, the Italians eventually settled on the Re.2001 as their standard carrier fighter/fighter-bomber and even the Germans concluded it had better potential than their own counterpart, the Messerschmitt Bf 109T. All flight testing—including simulated braked deck landings—was land-based.

Aquila′s planned air complement was 51 non-folding Reggiane Re.2001 OR fighter-bombers: 41 stowed in the hangar deck (including 15 suspended from the deck head) and 10 on the flight deck in a permanent deck park. A folding-wing version of the Re.2001 was planned, which would have increased the size of Aquila′s air group to 66 aircraft, but this never materialized. Only 10 Re.2001s were fully converted for carrier use. They were given tail hooks, RTG naval radio equipment and bomb racks for carrying 650 kg (1,430 lb) of bombs. They were also armed with two 12.7 mm (0.5 in) Breda-SAFAT machine guns mounted above the engine cowling. At least one Re.2001G was under test at Perugia as a naval torpedo bomber and was given a lengthened tail wheel strut to accommodate the added height of a torpedo suspended below the fuselage.

== Fate ==
Aquila was nearing 90% completion and had passed her first static test when Italy surrendered to the Allies on 8 September 1943 . Germany and its puppet state, the Italian Social Republic, then seized the ship and placed it under guard. However, because of the general poor military situation and the ongoing bombing attacks on her and the nearby naval infrastructure, work never resumed. Aquila was later damaged again on 16 June 1944, during an Allied air attack on Genoa. By that same year, the Germans had already started to loot the ship and partially dismantle her.

Near the end of the war, the royalist Italian Co-belligerent Navy feared the Germans might use Aquila as a blockship to the entrance to Genoa harbor, just as they did with her sister ship, the converted aircraft carrier Sparviero (formerly the ocean liner Augustus) a few months prior. Mariassalto divers from the former Decima Flottiglia MAS then executed a daring sabotage operation on the night of the 18 and 19 April 1945, in which they partially sunk Aquila in a harmless location.

Raised after the war, Aquila was towed to La Spezia in 1949 and renamed Pontone P227. Consideration was given to possibly completing her or converting her to other civilian uses, but this was deemed either too expensive or too politically problematic. She was eventually scrapped in 1952.

== See also ==
- Italian aircraft carrier Sparviero

== Bibliography ==
- Barker, Lt. Cmdr Edward L. (March 1954). "War Without Aircraft Carriers". United States Naval Institute Proceedings. United States Naval Institute.
- Brescia, Maurizio (2012). Mussolini's Navy. Seaforth Publishing. ISBN 978-1-84832-115-1.
- Brown, David (1977). WWII Fact Files: Aircraft Carriers. Arco Publishing.
- Burke, Stephen (2008). Without Wings: The Story of Hitler's Aircraft Carrier. Trafford Publishing.
- Cernuschi, Enrico; O'Hara, Vincent P. (2007). Jordan, John (ed.). Search for a Flattop – The Italian Navy and the Aircraft Carrier 1907–2007. Warship 2007. London: Conway. pp. 61–80. ISBN 978-1-84486-041-8.
- Chesneau, Roger (1998). Aircraft Carriers of the World, 1914 to the Present. Brockhampton Press. ISBN 0-87021-902-2.
- Cosentino, Michele (2021). "The Italian Aircraft Carrier Aquila". In Jordan, John (ed.). Warship 2021. Oxford, UK: Osprey Publishing. pp. 61–80. ISBN 978-1-4728-4779-9.
- Cosentino, Michele (2011). Le Portaerei Italiane. Tuttostoria. ISBN 978-88-87372-96-0.
- Cosentino, Michelle (2020). "The Quest of an Italian Aircraft Carrier 1922–1939". In Jordan, John (ed.). Warship 2020. Oxford, UK: Osprey. pp. 152–166. ISBN 978-1-4728-4071-4.
- Dunning, Chris (1998). Courage Alone: The Italian Air Force 1940–1943. Hikoki Publications. ISBN 1-902109-02-3.
- Giorgerini, Giorgio; Nani, Augusto (1966). Le Navi di Linea Italiane 1861-1961. Roma: Ufficio Storico della Marina Militare.
- Greene, Jack; Alessandro Massignani (1998). The Naval War in the Mediterranean 1940–1943. Chatham Publishing. ISBN 1-86176-190-2.
- Grossman, Mark (1990). "The Allied Assault on Aquila: Operation Toast". Warship International. XXVII (2): 166–173. ISSN 0043-0374.
- Grossman, Mark (1991). "Re: Letter from Messrs. Rastelli and Bagnasco". Warship International. XXVIII (2): 109–110. ISSN 0043-0374.
- Jabes, Davide F.; Sappino, Stefano (2018). Aircraft Carrier Impero: The Axis Powers' V-1 Carrying Capital Ship. Fonthill Media. ISBN 978-1-78155-677-1.
- Knox, MacGregor (2000). Hitler's Italian Allies: Royal Armed Forces, Fascist Regime and the War of 1940–1943. Cambridge University Press. ISBN 0-521-74713-9.
- Lembo, Daniele (2004). Le portaerei del Duce: le navi portaidrovolanti e le navi portaerei della Regia Marina. Grafica MA.RO.
- Lembo, Daniele (2013). Le portaerei che non salparono. IBN. ISBN 978-88-7565-169-5.
- Rastelli, Achille (2001). Le Portaerei Italiana: Testimonianze fra cronaca e storia. Ugo Mursia. ISBN 978-88-425-2816-6.
- Rastelli, Achille & Bagnasco, Erminico (1990). "The Sinking of the Italian Aircraft Carrier Aquila: A Controversial Question". Warship International. XXVII (1): 55–70. ISSN 0043-0374.
- Rastelli, Achille & Bagnasco, Erminio (1990). "Re: The Allied Assault on Aquila: Operation Toast". Warship International. XXVII (4): 324, 326. ISSN 0043-0374.
- Sadkovich, James J. (1994). The Italian Navy in World War II. Greenwood Press. ISBN 0-313-28797-X.
- Suma, Gabriele (2008). Flotta senz'ali: Perchè la Germania e l'Italia non ebbero portaerei. Prospettiva Editrice. ISBN 978-88-7418-475-0.
