= Italian Navy (disambiguation) =

Italian Navy may refer to:

- Pre-unitarian navies of the Italian states
- Regia Marina, the Royal Navy of the Kingdom of Italy (1861–1946)
- National Republican Navy (Italy), the navy of Italian Social Republic
- Italian Co-belligerent Navy
- Italian Navy (Marina Militare), the navy of the Italian Republic (1946–today)
