= SS Roma (1926) =

Ocean liner

- SS Roma

History

Italy
- Name: 1926–1941: SS Roma; 1941–1949: RN Aquila; 1949–1952: Pontone P227
- Owner: 1926–1932: Navigazione Generale Italiana; 1932–1941: Italian Line; 1941–1943: Royal Italian Navy; 1943–1945: National Republican Navy and German occupation forces; 1945–1952: Italian Navy
- Port of registry: (Kingdom of Italy) Genoa, Italy
- Builder: Ansaldo Shipyards, Genoa, Italy
- Launched: 26 February 1926
- Completed: September 1926
- In service: 21 September 1926
- Fate: Sabotaged and partially sunk in 1945 by Italian Co-Belligerent Navy, raised and scrapped 1952

General characteristics
- Type: 1926–1942: Ocean liner; 1942–1945: Aircraft carrier
- Tonnage: 32,583 GRT
- Length: 215.25 m (706.2 ft)
- Beam: 25.2 m (82.7 ft)
- Draft: 9.2 m (30.2 ft)
- Propulsion: 8 steam turbines geared 4 shafts, 4 screws
- Speed: 20 knots

SS Roma was an ocean liner built for the Italian shipping company Navigazione Generale Italiana of Genoa by Ansaldo shipyard in Sestri Ponente. She was the sister ship to MS Augustus. The ship was later transferred to the new Italian Line after the merger of Navigazione Generale Italiana. When the Second World War broke out, she was acquired by the Navy for Conversion to aircraft carrier name Aquila. She was taken over by the National Republican Navy of the Italian Social Republic and German occupation forces in 1943 but was partially sunk in 1945 by a commando attack of Mariassalto, an Italian royalist assault unit of the Co-Belligerent Navy of the Kingdom of Italy, made up by members of the former Decima Flottiglia MAS. Roma was raised and scrapped by 1952.

== History ==
=== Ocean liner career ===
Following the end of World War I, many shipping companies were waiting to have enough money to build new liners. Navigazione Generale Italiana ordered two new 30,000 gross register tons transatlantic ocean liners from Ansaldo shipyard. The first ship was launched in 1926 and christened Roma. She had an entire steel hull. Her interior was decorated in Baroque style. The ship was 32,583 GRT with signal code letters ICEV.

Unlike Roma's sister ship MS Augustus, Roma was powered by eight turbines connected in couples to four shafts. Steam for the turbines was provided by 9 double-ended and 4 single-ended boilers; all in all, the ship was able to boast a maximum speed of 22 knots (41 km/h; 25 mph). Some of the machinery was sourced from the canceled Italian Navy Francesco Caracciolo-class battleship Cristoforo Colombo. Roma could carry approximately 1675 passengers in four classes (375 first, 300 second, 300 intermediate, and 700 third class).

Her two funnels were repainted into the Italian Line's colors after her company merged with Lloyd Sabaudo and Cosulich Line to form the new Italian Line. In 1933 the intermediate class was replaced by the touristic one. The main deck was covered with teak.

On 30 January 1932, Roma rammed the American ocean liner President Roosevelt at New York, severely damaging President Roosevelt. President Roosevelt was repaired and returned to service. The Roma continued passenger service until the Italian declaration of war in 1940, after which she was laid up until 1941.

=== Conversion to aircraft carrier ===
When World War II broke out, she was laid up and later taken over by the Royal Italian Navy. She was then rebuilt and transformed into an aircraft carrier named Aquila. Her speed was increased to 30 knots after the refitting. She was however 90% complete when the Kingdom of Italy signed the 1943 armistice. She was thereafter taken over by the National Republican Navy and the German occupation forces in 1943, which placed her under guard. By 1944 the German forces started to loot and partially demolish the ship, which was eventually sabotaged and partially sunk by the royalist Italian Co-Belligerent Navy.

Fearing that the Germans could seize her and scuttle her as a blockship at the entrance of Genoa's harbour, just as had happened a few months earlier to Roma's sister ship Augustus, then already become the aircraft carrier Sparviero, the Mariassalto commando unit, made up by members of the former Decima Flottiglia MAS, launched a manned torpedo attack on the night of the 18 and 19 of April 1945, partially sinking the Aquila.

After the end of the conflict, some consideration was given to her possible completion and commission, however, this was deemed anti-economical and politically problematic. Her wreckage was raised and in 1949 towed to La Spezia, renamed as Pontone P227. Here, she was to be fully scrapped by 1952.

== See also ==
- MS Augustus
- Italian aircraft carrier Aquila

== Bibliography ==
- Ordovini, Aldo F.; Petronio, Fulvio; et al. (2017). "Capital Ships of the Royal Italian Navy, 1860–1918: Part 4: Dreadnought Battleships". Warship International. LIV (4): 307–343. ISSN 0043-0374.
