= Ubaldo degli Uberti =

Italian admiral (1881–1945)

- Born: 10 March 1881; Naples, Kingdom of Italy
- Died: 27 April 1945 (aged 64); Vicenza, Italian Social Republic
- Military career
- Allegiance: Kingdom of Italy; Italian Social Republic
- Branch: Regia Marina; National Republican Navy
- Rank: Rear Admiral
- Commands: Giacinto Pullino (submarine)
- Conflicts: World War I; Adriatic campaign; World War II
- Awards: War Cross for Military Valor

Ubaldo degli Uberti (10 March 1881 – 27 April 1945) was an Italian admiral during World War II.

== Biography ==
A descendant of Florentine nobleman and Ghibelline leader Farinata degli Uberti, he was born in Naples in 1881. During World War I, in 1916, Degli Uberti, who held at the time the rank of Lieutenant, was given command of the submarine Giacinto Pullino, based in Venice, carrying out a number of patrols in the Adriatic Sea. Between 3 and 6 July 1916 Pullino torpedoed and damaged Austro-Hungarian steamer San Mauro just outside of the harbour of Fiume, permanently disabling it, and then evaded hunt by six Austro-Hungarian torpedo boats and three flying boats. For this action he was awarded a War Cross for Military Valor.

On the night of 29 July 1916, during another patrol, Pullino ran aground in heavy fog in the Gulf of Kvarner. After unsuccessfully trying to free the submarine for several hours, at dawn Degli Uberti concluded that it would have to be abandoned; after destroying all secret documents and sabotaging the submarine in order to prevent its capture, the crew tried to escape towards Italy in a sailboat that a party led by the executive officer had found on the nearby coast, but they were intercepted and taken prisoner by an Austro-Hungarian warship. The incident was most notable because Istrian irredentist Nazario Sauro was part of Pullino's crew, serving as pilot; being an Austro-Hungarian citizen, after his capture he was tried for treason, sentenced to death, and executed by the Austro-Hungarians. Degli Uberti and his men spent the rest of the war in a prisoner-of-war camp.

Having resumed service in 1918, Degli Uberti left the Navy in the late 1920s, owing to disagreements with his superiors, in order to pursue a writing career. In 1934 he met American poet Ezra Pound, then living in Rapallo, becoming his translator into Italian. Sharing the same political positions and economic theories, Degli Uberti and Pound formed a deep friendship. Moreover, Pound, interested in medieval Italian symbolism, was fascinated by Degli Uberti and his lineage, affectionately nicknaming him "UB2". The friendship between Degli Uberti and Pound would continue even during World War II and they continued to maintain a close exchange of letters, both siding with the Italian Social Republic; Pound would later mention him in his Cantos.

Degli Uberti returned to active service in the Royal Italian Navy after Italy's entrance into World War II; in 1941 he was promoted to Rear Admiral and entrusted with the propaganda and press office of the Regia Marina. He was director of the weekly Navy magazine Prore armate and promoted films such as Roberto Rossellini's La nave bianca.

After the Armistice of Cassibile, Degli Uberti was one of the few Italian admirals who joined the Italian Social Republic; in the autumn of 1943 he became head of the press and propaganda office of the Marina Nazionale Repubblicana (with headquarters in Vicenza, later moved to Montecchio Maggiore) and director of its magazine Marina Repubblicana. The magazine hosted an open letter by Ezra Pound as well as fragments of the LXXII canto (honouring the recently deceased Filippo Tommaso Marinetti) and the entire LXXIII canto (celebrating a girl from Romagna who purposefully led a squad of Allied soldiers about to occupy Rimini into a minefield, at the cost of her own life) of his Cantos. Pound published his last article on Marina Repubblicana on April 1, 1945. Four days later, the disenchanted Degli Uberti reportedly remarked "Here those who die make a bargain".

On 26 April 1945 some men of the "Pegaso" Battalion of Decima Flottiglia MAS, guarding the Undersecretariat of the National Republican Navy in Montecchio Maggiore, intervened to prevent the looting of the battalion's warehouse by the local population, but in doing so they were attacked by a small retreating German unit, made up of Russian volunteers, who had mistaken them for enemies. During the clash the car of Admiral Degli Uberti arrived and was ordered to halt, but when he was about to get out of the car the Russians opened fire, mortally wounding him. He was carried to a nearby hospital, where he died shortly thereafter. He was buried in Vicenza.
