= Sparviero =

Sparviero is Italian for Sparrowhawk. It can refer to:

- Italian aircraft carrier Sparviero
- Operation Sparviero, the Italian Army contribution to ISAF in Kabul, Afghanistan
- Pasotti F.9 Sparviero, an Italian four seat low wing touring aircraft
- Pro.Mecc Sparviero, an Italian ultralight aircraft
- Savoia-Marchetti S.M.79 Sparviero, a three-engined Italian medium bomber
- Sparviero class patrol boat
