= Italian ship Sparviero =

Sparviero has been the name of at least four ships of the Italian Navy and may refer to:

- Italian torpedo boat Sparviero, a torpedo boat launched in 1888.
- NMS Mărăști, a Vifor-class destroyer ordered by Romania as Vijele. Seized in 1915 by Italy, renamed Sparviero before her launch in 1917, and completed as a scout cruiser. Purchased again by Romania in 1920, reclassified as a destroyer, and renamed Mărăști.
- Italian aircraft carrier Sparviero, previously the passenger liner MS Augustus. Conversion started in 1942 with the name Falco and then renamed Sparviero but the conversion was never finished. She was seized by Germany in 1943 and scuttled in 1944.
- Italian patrol boat Sparviero (P420), a Sparviero-class patrol boat launched in 1973 and retired in 1991.
