= Promecc Aerospace =

Italian aircraft manufacturer

Promecc Aerospace s.r.l.
- Company type: Private company
- Industry: Aerospace
- Headquarters: Corigliano d'Otranto, Italy
- Products: Ultralight aircraft
- Website: promecc-group.it

Promecc Aerospace s.r.l. (formerly Pro.Mecc S.r.l.) is an Italian aircraft manufacturer based in Corigliano d'Otranto. The company specializes in the design and manufacture of ultralight aircraft predominantly using carbon fibre construction.

The company's first design, the Sparviero (English: Sparrowhawk) was introduced in the 2000s. It was later developed into the faster Freccia Anemo (English: Fast Arrow) model which was introduced in 2011, with a new wing design and aerodynamic refinements that produced a cruise speed of 260 km/h (162 mph) on 75 kW (101 hp).

== Aircraft ==
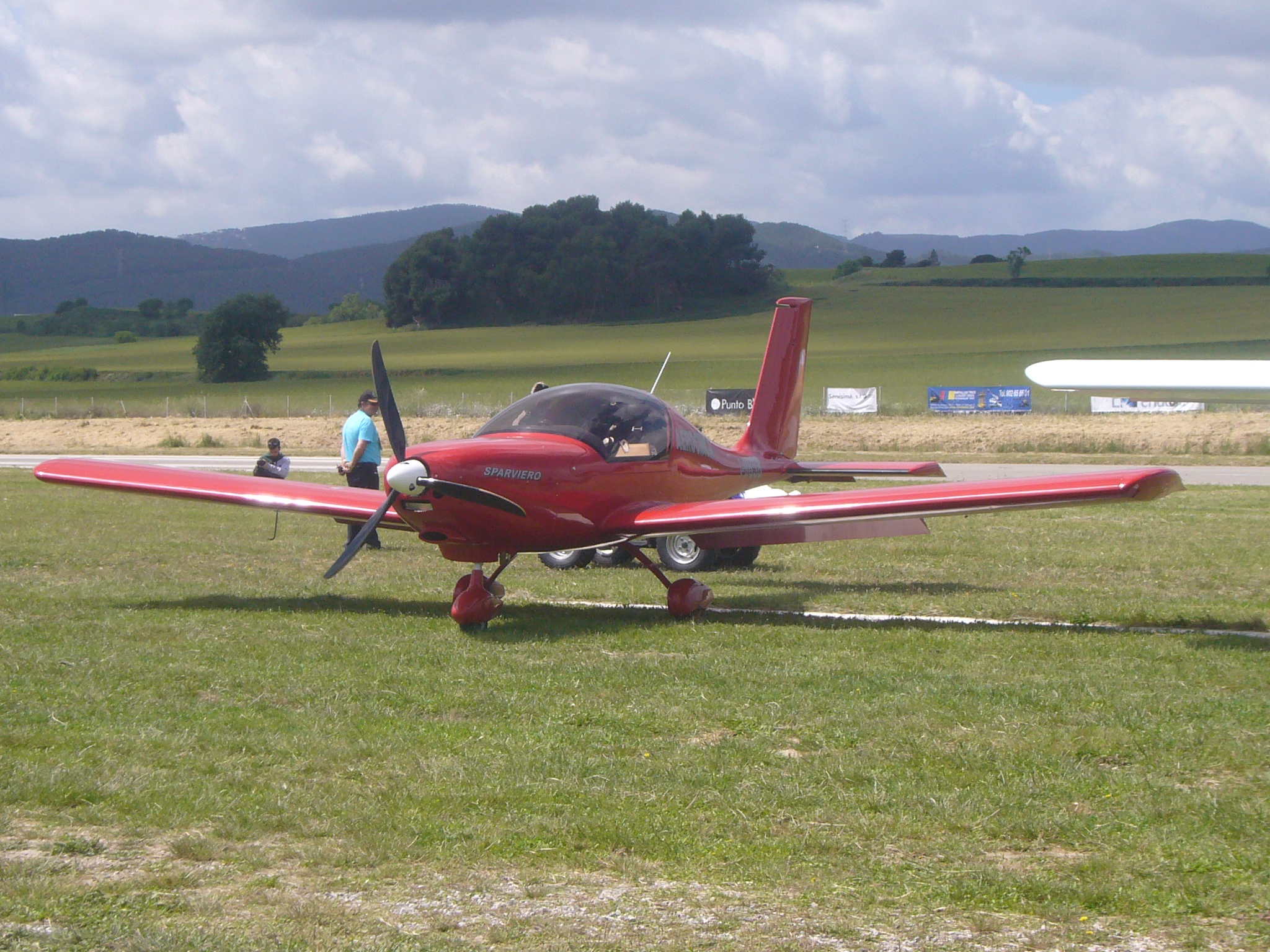
Pro.Mecc Sparviero

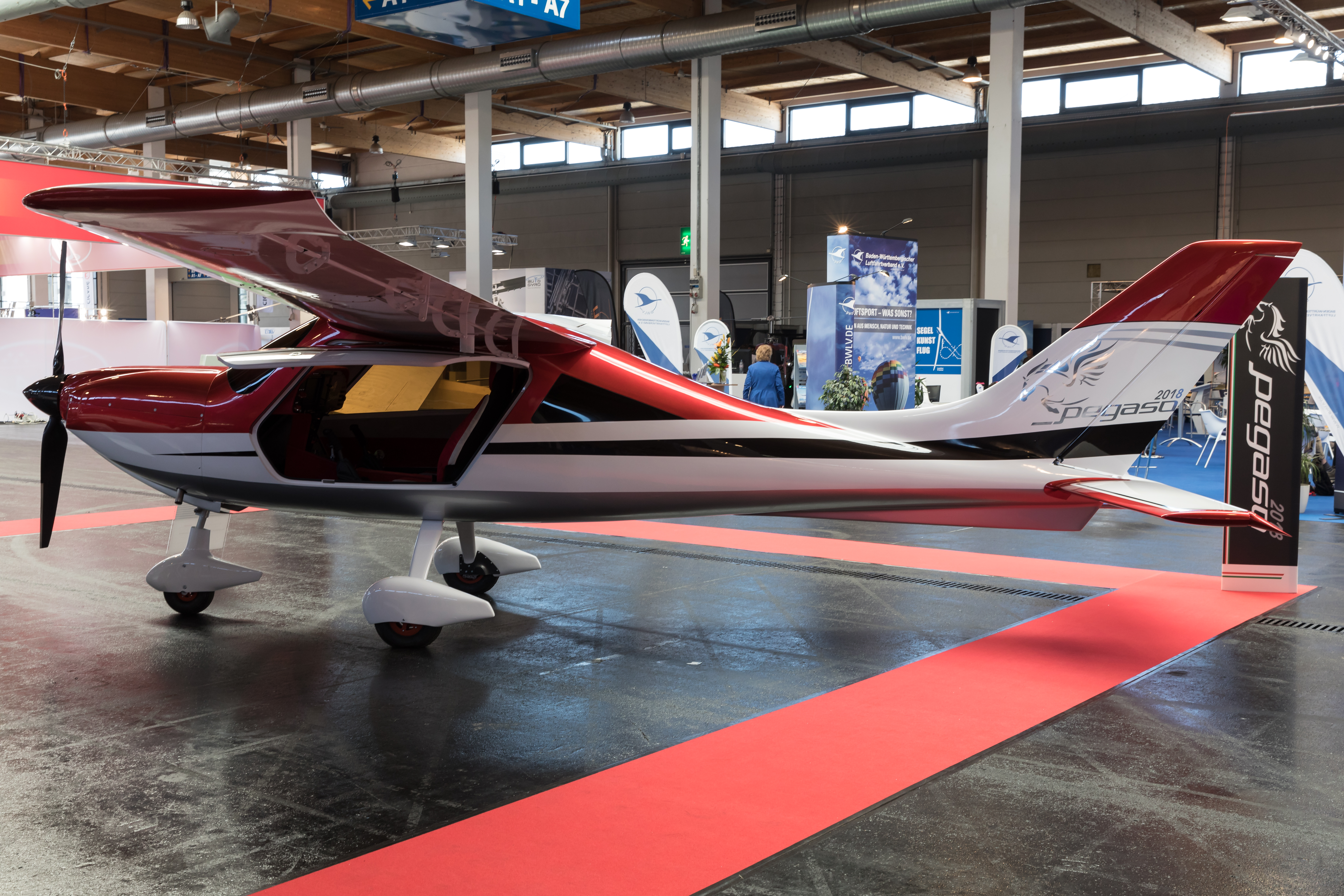
Promecc Pegaso

Summary of aircraft built by Pro.Mecc
Model name	First flight	Number built	Type
Pro.Mecc Freccia Anemo			ultralight aircraft
Pro.Mecc Sparviero			ultralight aircraft
Promecc Pegaso			ultralight aircraft

== See also ==
- List of Italian companies
