= Pro.Mecc Freccia Anemo =

Italian ultralight aircraft

Freccia Anemo
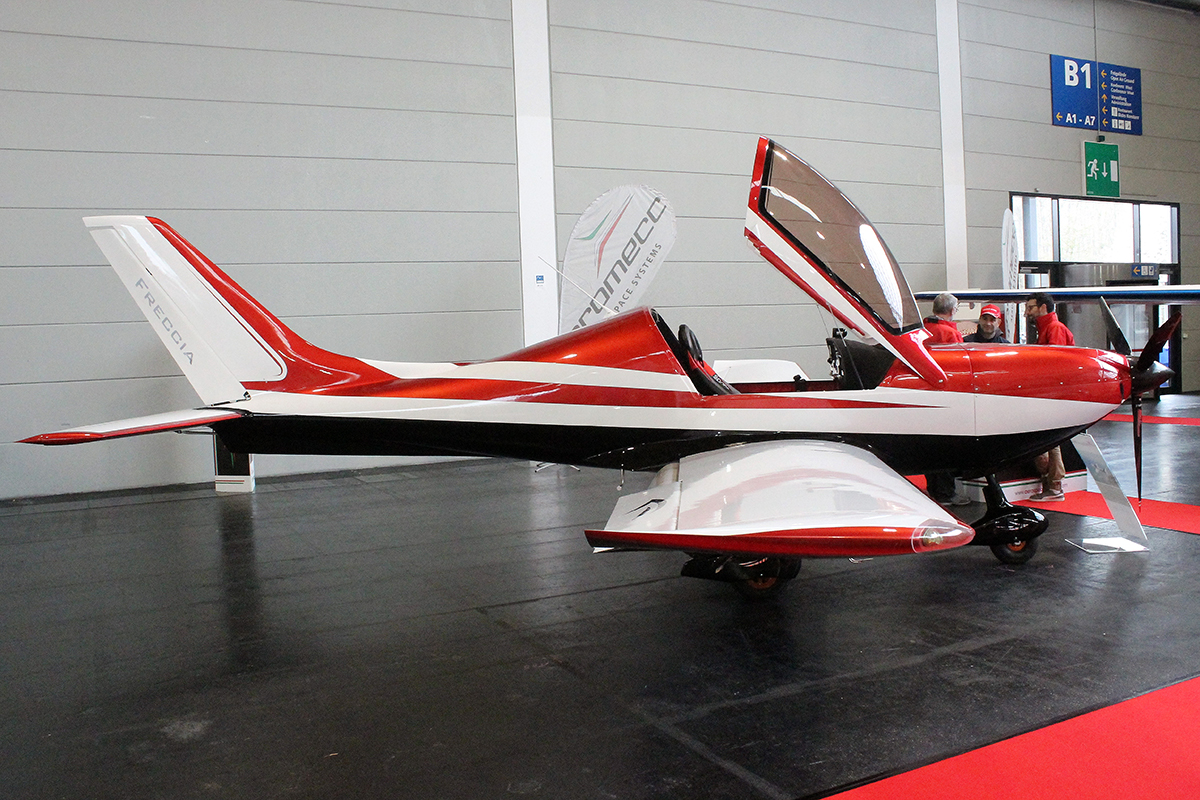

General information
- Type: Ultralight aircraft
- National origin: Italy
- Manufacturer: Promecc Aerospace
- Status: In production (2012)

History
- Introduction date: 2011
- Developed from: Pro.Mecc Sparviero

The Promecc Freccia Anemo (English: Fast Arrow) is an Italian ultralight aircraft, designed and produced by Promecc Aerospace of Corigliano d'Otranto. The aircraft was introduced at the AERO Friedrichshafen show in 2011. The Freccia is supplied as a complete ready-to-fly-aircraft.

== Design and development ==
The Freccia was derived from the earlier Pro.Mecc Sparviero, with additional streamlining and a new elliptical wing planform. It was designed to conform to the Fédération Aéronautique Internationale microlight rules. It features a cantilever low-wing, a two-seats-in-side-by-side configuration enclosed cockpit under a bubble canopy, fixed or, optionally, retractable tricycle landing gear and a single engine in tractor configuration.

The aircraft is made from carbon fibre. Its 8.78 m (28.8 ft) span wing has an area of 10.18 m^{2} (109.6 sq ft) and double slotted flaps to allow a low stall speed. Engines available are the 100 hp (75 kW) Rotax 912ULS, the turbocharged 115 hp (86 kW) Rotax 914, the turbocharged 141 hp (105 kW) Rotax 915 powerplant.

== Variants ==
Freccia
Fixed landing gear model, introduced in 2011
Freccia-RG
Retractable landing gear model, introduced in 2012

== Specifications (Freccia Anemo) ==
Data from Bayerl

General characteristics

- Crew: one
- Capacity: one passenger
- Wingspan: 8.78 m (28 ft 10 in)
- Wing area: 10.18 m^{2} (109.6 sq ft)
- Empty weight: 285 kg (628 lb)
- Gross weight: 472.5 kg (1,042 lb)
- Fuel capacity: 110 litres (24 imp gal; 29 US gal)
- Powerplant: 1 × Rotax 912ULS four cylinder, liquid and air-cooled, four stroke aircraft engine, 75 kW (101 hp)

Performance

- Maximum speed: 280 km/h (170 mph, 150 kn)
- Cruise speed: 260 km/h (160 mph, 140 kn)
- Stall speed: 65 km/h (40 mph, 35 kn)
- Never exceed speed: 300 km/h (190 mph, 160 kn)
- Rate of climb: 8 m/s (1,600 ft/min)
- Wing loading: 46.4 kg/m^{2} (9.5 lb/sq ft)
