= MS Augustus (1926) =

Italian ocean liner, cruise ship and aircraft carrier

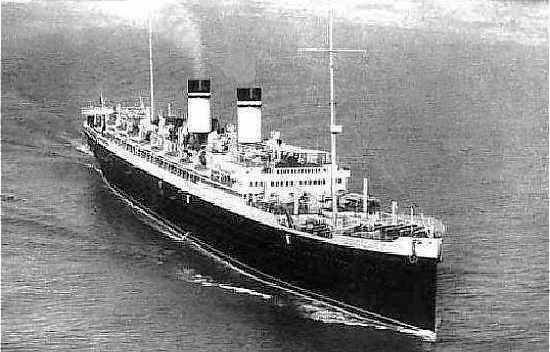
- MS Augustus

History
- Name: 1926–1941: Augustus; 1941: Falco; 1941–1951: Sparviero
- Namesake: Emperor Augustus
- Operator: 1927–1932: Navigazione Generale Italiana (Italy); 1932–1942: Italian Line (Italy); 1942–1943: Royal Italian Navy (Kingdom of Italy); 1943–1944: National Republican Navy (Italian Social Republic); 1945–1951: Italian Navy (Italy)
- Port of registry: Genoa Italy
- Builder: Ansaldo Shipyard
- Launched: 13 December 1926
- Christened: December 1926
- Maiden voyage: 10 November 1927
- Out of service: Laid up from 1940 to 1942
- Fate: Scuttled as a blockship in 1944, then raised in 1947 and scrapped in 1951

General characteristics
- Type: Combined ocean liner/cruise ship
- Tonnage: 32,650 GRT
- Length: 215.25
- Beam: 25.20 m
- Decks: 9 decks
- Installed power: 28,000 hp
- Propulsion: 4 Savoja MAN Mixed/Dual Cycle diesel engines; four propellers.
- Speed: 20 knots (37.4 km/h)
- Capacity: 1,675 passengers

MS Augustus was a combined ocean liner and cruise ship built in 1926 for the Navigazione Generale Italiana (NGI). Augustus operated mostly on the Europe to South and North America routes, on the former being one of, if not the largest and fastest liner to sail on regular crossings.

At the time of its construction, the Augustus was the largest motor ship in the world, and remains to this day the largest quadruple-screw, diesel-powered ocean liner ever built. The ship was later transferred, together with her steam turbine-powered sister ship SS Roma to the new Italian Line after the merger of the Navigazione Generale Italiana with the Lloyd Sabaudo and the Cosulich Line.

During World War II the Augustus was converted into an aircraft carrier by the Regia Marina and first renamed Falco, and at a later time, Sparviero, while the Roma became the aircraft carrier Aquila. Neither of them ever entered combat service under these new roles. In 1944, both ships were taken over by the occupying German troops, but on 25 September of that same year Augustus was scuttled as a blockship at the entrance to the port of Genoa. After the war, she was raised in 1947 and ultimately scrapped in 1951.

== History ==
=== Ocean Liner career ===
Following the end of World War I, many shipping companies were planning to build new liners once they had enough money. Navigazione Generale Italiana decided to build two new liners of over 30,000 gross registered tons for post war service. The first ship was Roma which was launched in 1926. The second ship was launched in December 1926 at the Ansaldo Shipyard and was christened Augustus by Edda Mussolini (daughter of dictator Benito Mussolini). She was fitted out and made her maiden voyage on 10 November 1927. Her interior was decorated in the Baroque style. She was the largest diesel-engined passenger ship of her time, whereas her sister was equipped with geared steam turbines. The Augustus was c. 215 meters long and was designed to carry 1,675 passengers.

She operated on the South American service, one of the fastest and largest liners to do so, while her sister ran the North Atlantic service. The Augustus could reportedly reach South America from Italy in five days at an average speed of 22 knots. In 1932, Navigazione Generale Italiana was forced by Mussolini to merge with other Italian shipping companies to form the Italia Line. Because of this, the funnels of the Augustus were repainted in Italia Line colours. In 1933, she began to carry out 129-day world cruises after the Wall Street crash of 1929. She carried many passengers from New York to a number of ports around the world and back to New York in 129 days. The Augustus continued passenger service until 1940.

=== Conversion to aircraft carrier ===
At the outbreak of World War II the Augustus and the Roma were laid up but both ships were subsequently taken over by the Italian Navy. Like her sister, the Augustus was converted into an aircraft carrier and renamed Falco and later Sparviero. Before work could be completed, the Kingdom of Italy signed an armistice in 1943, and both ships were shortly thereafter captured by the neoestablished National Republican Navy of the Italian Social Republic, a German puppet state. In 1944, both ships were taken over by the German troops, but on 5 October of that year Augustus was scuttled in order to blockade Genoa's harbour from the Allies. After the war, she was raised in 1947 and scrapped in 1951.
