= Pro.Mecc Sparviero =

Italian ultralight aircraft

Sparviero
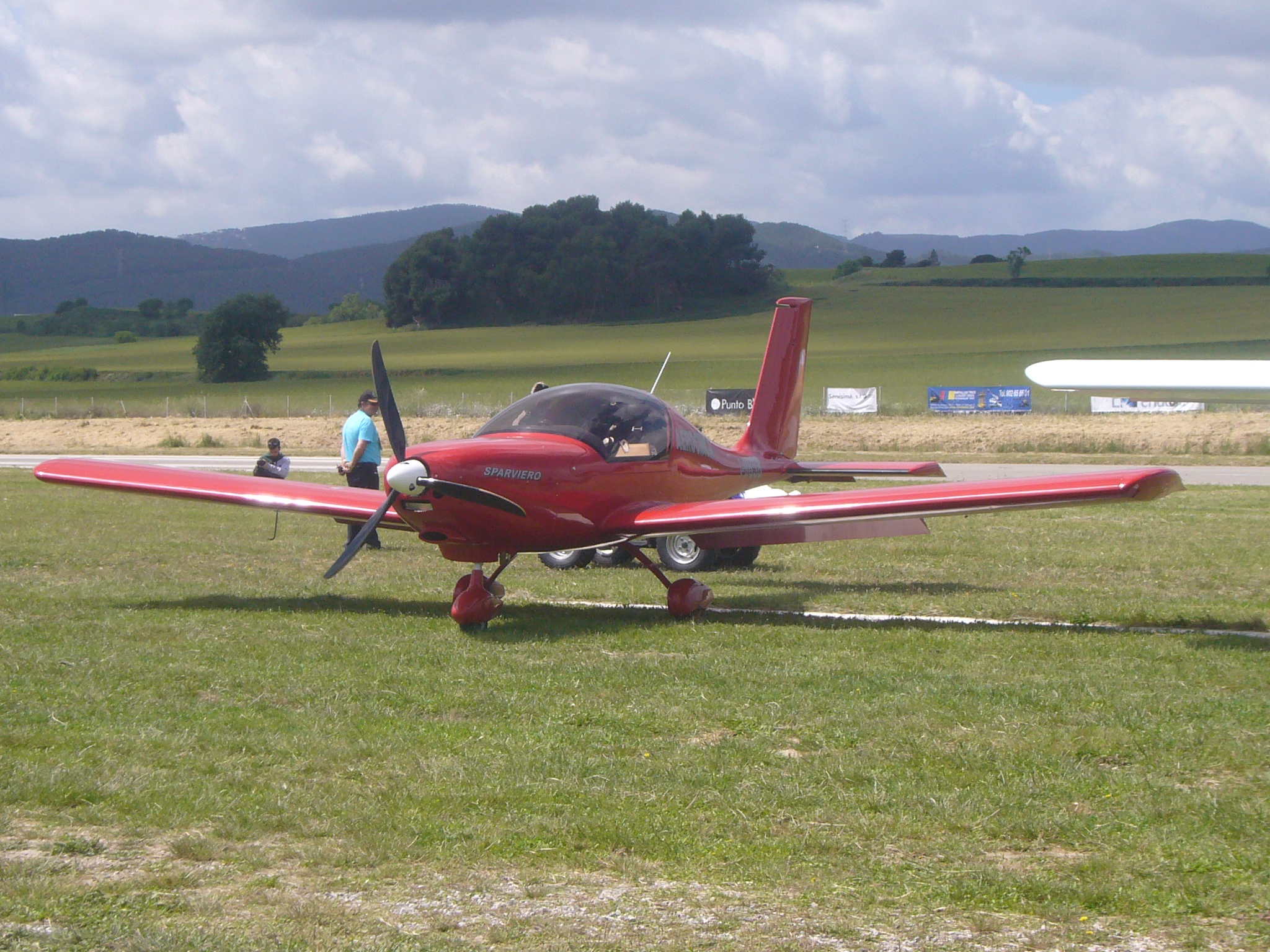
- Pro Mecc Sparviero 100 at the Aerosport air show in 2013

General information
- Type: Ultralight aircraft
- National origin: Italy
- Manufacturer: Pro.Mecc
- Status: In production (2012)

History
- Variant: Pro.Mecc Freccia Anemo

The Pro.Mecc Sparviero (English: Sparrowhawk) is an Italian ultralight aircraft, designed and produced by Pro.Mecc of Corigliano d'Otranto. The Sparviero is supplied as a kit for amateur construction or a complete ready-to-fly-aircraft.

== Design and development ==
The Sparviero was designed to conform to the Fédération Aéronautique Internationale microlight rules. It features a cantilever low-wing, a two-seats-in-side-by-side configuration enclosed cockpit under a bubble canopy, fixed tricycle landing gear and a single engine in tractor configuration.

The Sparviero is made predominantly from carbon fibre, with the wing skins fabricated from fibreglass. Its 9.23 m (30.3 ft) span wing has an area of 12 m^{2} (130 sq ft) and flaps. The standard engine fitted is the 100 hp (75 kW) Rotax 912ULS four-stroke powerplant, with the 80 hp (60 kW) Rotax 912UL optional. In 2011 a fast-build kit was introduced that provides a completed and painted fuselage and wings, requiring the builder only to carry out the engine and electrical installations.

The Sparviero was later developed into the Pro.Mecc Freccia Anemo, with additional streamlining and a new elliptical planform wing.

== Operational history ==
Reviewer Marino Boric described the design in a 2015 review as, "not only stylish, but aggressively low-priced for mainly built of carbonfiber...."

== Variants ==
Sparviero
Initial model
Sparviero 100
Improved model introduced in December 2009 with a lighter empty weight, higher cruise speed, lower-mounted seats and lower canopy.

== Specifications (Sparviero 100) ==
Data from Bayerl

General characteristics

- Crew: one
- Capacity: one passenger
- Wingspan: 9.23 m (30 ft 3 in)
- Wing area: 12 m^{2} (130 sq ft)
- Empty weight: 285 kg (628 lb)
- Gross weight: 472.5 kg (1,042 lb)
- Fuel capacity: 90 litres (20 imp gal; 24 US gal)
- Powerplant: 1 × Rotax 912ULS four cylinder, liquid and air-cooled, four stroke aircraft engine, 75 kW (101 hp)

Performance

- Maximum speed: 240 km/h (150 mph, 130 kn)
- Cruise speed: 225 km/h (140 mph, 121 kn)
- Stall speed: 54 km/h (34 mph, 29 kn)
- Rate of climb: 6 m/s (1,200 ft/min)
- Wing loading: 39.4 kg/m^{2} (8.1 lb/sq ft)
