= Italian Co-belligerent Navy =

The Italian Co-Belligerent Navy (Marina Cobelligerante Italiana), or Navy of the South (Marina del Sud) or Royal Navy (Regia Marina), was the navy of the Italian royalist forces fighting on the side of the Allies in southern Italy after the Allied armistice with Italy in September 1943. The Italian seamen fighting for this navy no longer fought for Italian dictator Benito Mussolini. Their allegiance was to King Victor Emmanuel and Marshal of Italy (Maresciallo d'Italia) Pietro Badoglio, the men who ousted Mussolini. This culminated in the fall of fascism in the south of Italy.

The Italian Navy played an important role once the armistice was signed. Nine cruisers, 33 destroyers, 39 submarines, 12 motor torpedo boats, 20 escorts, three mine-layers, and the seaplane tender Giusseppe Miraglia joined the Italian Co-Belligerent Navy. It was not permitted to operate battleships because there was little military use for them at this stage of the war and because of doubts over the reliability of their crews. The two modern Littorio-class battleships were detained by the Allies in Egyptian waters, while the three older battleships were allowed to serve as training ships. There were additionally four squadrons of seaplanes from the Italian Royal Air Force (Regia Aeronautica).

Present within the Co-Belligerent Navy were the groups "Mariassalto", carrying on the legacy of the Decima Flottiglia MAS frogmen group on the allied side, and the "San Marco" brigade, who were the first allied forces to enter the city of Venice.

== See also ==
- Military history of Italy during World War II
- Co-belligerence
- Regia Marina
- Italian Co-Belligerent Army
- Italian Co-Belligerent Air Force
- Marina Nazionale Repubblicana
