= Italian aircraft carrier Sparviero =

Ocean liner repurposed for military use

History

Italy
- Name: 1941: Falco; 1941-1951: Sparviero
- Builder: Ansaldo, Genoa
- Launched: 13 December 1926 as ocean liner Augustus
- Out of service: Augustus Laid up from 1940 to 1942
- Renamed: 1941
- Refit: Royal Italian Navy began conversion work in 1942, incomplete due to 1943 surrender of the Kingdom of Italy
- Captured: 1943 by National Republican Navy of the Italian Social Republic
- Fate: Taken over by occupying German troops in 1944 and scuttled as blockship. Raised in 1947 and scrapped in 1951

General characteristics
- Type: Escort carrier
- Displacement: 30418 tons
- Length: 232.5 m (762 ft 10 in)
- Beam: 29.4 m (96 ft 5 in)
- Draught: 7.39 m (24 ft 3 in)
- Installed power: 28,000 horsepower (21,000 kW)
- Propulsion: diesels
- Speed: 20 knots (37 km/h; 23 mph)
- Complement: 1,420 men (including 107 officers)
- Armament: 8 × 135/45 mm; 12 × 65/64 mm; 22 machine guns 20/65 mm
- Armour: 70 mm (vertical); 80 mm (horizontal)
- Aircraft carried: 46 aircraft (34 or 16 fighters, 9 torpedo bombers)

Sparviero (Italian: "Sparrowhawk") was an Italian aircraft carrier designed and built during World War II of the Regia Marina. She was originally the ocean liner MS Augustus built in 1926 for Navigazione Generale Italiana, but was transferred to the new Italian Line after the merger of Navigazione Generale Italiana with the Lloyd Sabaudo and the Cosulich Line. The conversion was started in 1942 originally under the name Falco but was never completed, and the ship was never delivered to the Regia Marina (Royal Italian Navy). She began to be scrapped in 1947, a process completed by 1951.

== Service history ==
=== As MS Augustus ===
MS Augustus and her sistership, were a group combined ocean liner and cruise ship built in 1927 for Navigazione Generale Italiana. She was launched in December 1926 at the Ansaldo Shipyard and was christened by Edda Mussolini (daughter of dictator Benito Mussolini). The ship was later transferred to the new Italian Line after the merger of Navigazione Generale Italiana. When Italy joined the war in 1940, she and her sister ship Roma ceased all passenger services and were laid up. The Royal Italian Navy (Regia Marina) then began the process to convert them both to aircraft carriers, which would begin with their seizure in 1941.

=== As Sparviero ===
In 1936, a project to transform the 30,418 GRT ocean liner Augustus into an auxiliary carrier was prepared. The idea was initially abandoned but then resumed in 1942.

The passenger ship Augustus was first renamed Falco in 1942 and then changed to Sparviero in the same year. The project resumed the one developed by the Colonel of the Naval Engineers Luigi Gagnotto and the transformation works began in September 1942 in the Ansaldo Shipyards in Genoa.

The superstructure was to be removed. She would have also been equipped with a single hangar with two lifts and fitted with a flight deck that ended 45 meters (148 ft) before the bow. The main armament would have been placed at the sides of the forecastle at the level of the hangar deck, and at the stern and there was no island structure because the exhaust gases of the diesel engines would have been expelled laterally below the level of the flight deck.

She would have had a narrow flight deck. Her air group was to be either 34 fighters or 16 fighters and 9 torpedo bombers. The propulsion plant was to remain unchanged, the diesel engines giving an estimated speed of 20 knots.

The Sparviero was going to have an armament of six 152 mm guns and four of 102, as well as several anti-aircraft machine gun positions.

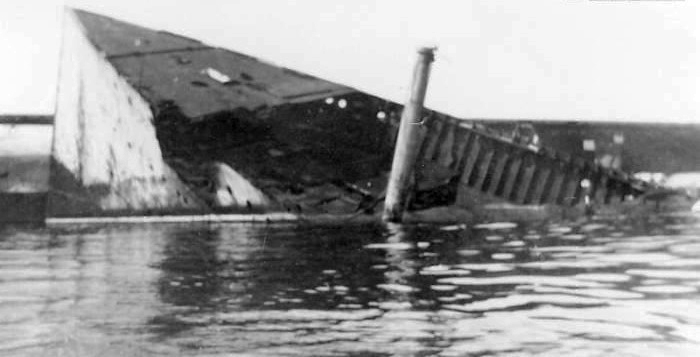
Wreck of Sparviero in Genoa, 1944

The conversion began in September 1942, the work undertaken by the Ansaldo Shipyard in Genoa. Apart from removing the superstructure little else was done before the Italian capitulation in September 1943. The hull was captured shortly after by the neoestablished National Republican Navy of the Italian Social Republic, a German puppet state. She was later taken over by the occupying German troops and was sunk on 5 October 1944 to block access to the port of Genoa. The wreckage was recovered after the war and finally scrapped in 1951.

Like Sparviero, the Italian aircraft carrier Aquila, a modification of the sister ship of Augustus, SS Roma, was scuttled and scrapped before the conversion into the aircraft carrier was finished.

These two ships were the last attempts to build aircraft carriers for the Italian Navy until 1981, when work began on Giuseppe Garibaldi.

== See also ==
- SS Roma (1926)
- MS Augustus (1926)
- Italian aircraft carrier Aquila

== Bibliography ==
- Cernuschi, Enrico (2026). "The Italian Aircraft Carrier Falco/Sparviero 1942–43: The Real Story". In Jordan, John (ed.). Warship 2026. Osprey Publishing. pp. 175–182. ISBN 978-1-4728-7259-3.
- Pierluigi Malvezzi, Regia Marina Italiana: Italian Carriers – regiamarina.net
