= Italian seaplane carrier Giuseppe Miraglia =

Italian seaplane carrier

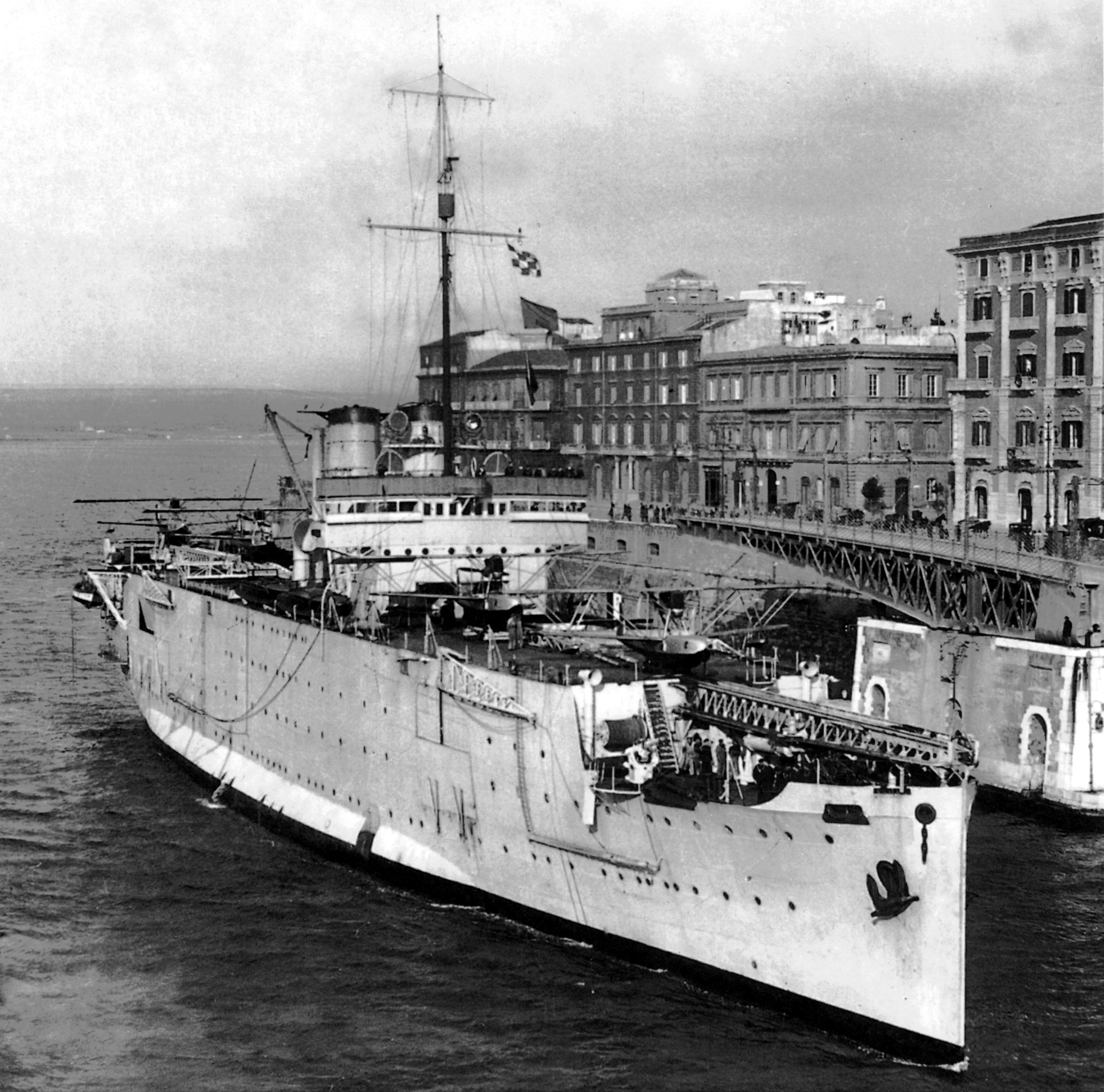
- Giuseppe Miraglia

History

Italy
- Name: Giuseppe Miraglia
- Namesake: Giuseppe Miraglia
- Builder: At launch: Arsenal di Taranto; Conversion to Seaplane carrier: Regio Arsenale della Spezia
- Laid down: 5 March 1921
- Launched: 20 December 1923
- Commissioned: 1 November 1927
- Stricken: 15 July 1950
- Fate: Scrapped

General characteristics
- Class & type: seaplane carrier
- Displacement: 5,400 tonnes normal; 5,913 tonnes full
- Length: 121.22 m
- Beam: 14.99 m
- Draught: 5.82 m
- Propulsion: 2 Parsons steam turbines with 8 Yarrow boilers, 2 shafts, 16,700 shp
- Speed: 21 knots (39 km/h)
- Complement: 16 Officers; 40 NCOs; 240 Ratings
- Armament: 4 × 102mm/35 guns; 12 × 13.2mm MGs
- Armour: belt 70mm; deck 80mm
- Aircraft carried: 17 seaplanes
- Aviation facilities: 2 catapults

Giuseppe Miraglia was an Italian seaplane carrier.

== History ==
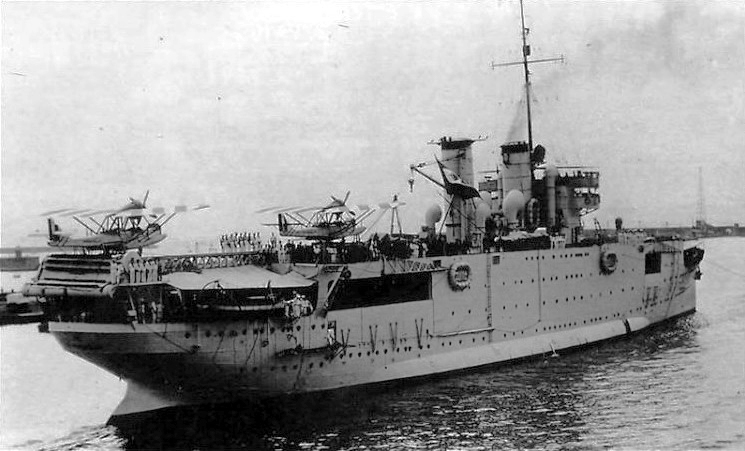
The Miraglia with seaplanes on her stern in 1940

Giuseppe Miraglia was laid down in 1921 as the train ferry Città di Messina, intended for use by the Italian State Railway Company, but was acquired by the Regia Marina soon after her launch in 1923. Works to convert her into a seaplane carrier began immediately; in 1925, with the ship nearly complete, Giuseppe Miraglia capsized during a storm. Salvaged under the direction of Umberto Pugliese, she was repaired and commissioned in November 1927.

Giuseppe Miraglia participated in the Second Italo-Abyssinian War and the Spanish Civil War.

During World War II, after surviving the Battle of Taranto, she was employed in the Mediterranean theatre. After the Armistice she sailed (along with much of the Italian fleet) to Malta for internment.

After the British motor torpedo boat depot ship HMS Vienna was straddled by bombs and put out of action during the Luftwaffe bombing raid on the Italian port of Bari on 2 December 1943, and the subsequent mustard gas disaster, Giuseppe Miraglia was impressed by the Royal Navy as temporary replacement.

After the war Giuseppe Miraglia was used to repatriate Italian prisoners-of-war, then spent the rest of her career as a barrack ship and workshop at Taranto until her scrapping in 1950.

== Aircraft facilities ==
Giuseppe Miraglia could carry some 17 seaplanes (originally Macchi M.18, later IMAM Ro.43) and one Reggiane 2000 "catapultabile". The ship was equipped with two catapults. Seaplanes could be retrieved by means of large doors and cranes at the sides of the hangar.

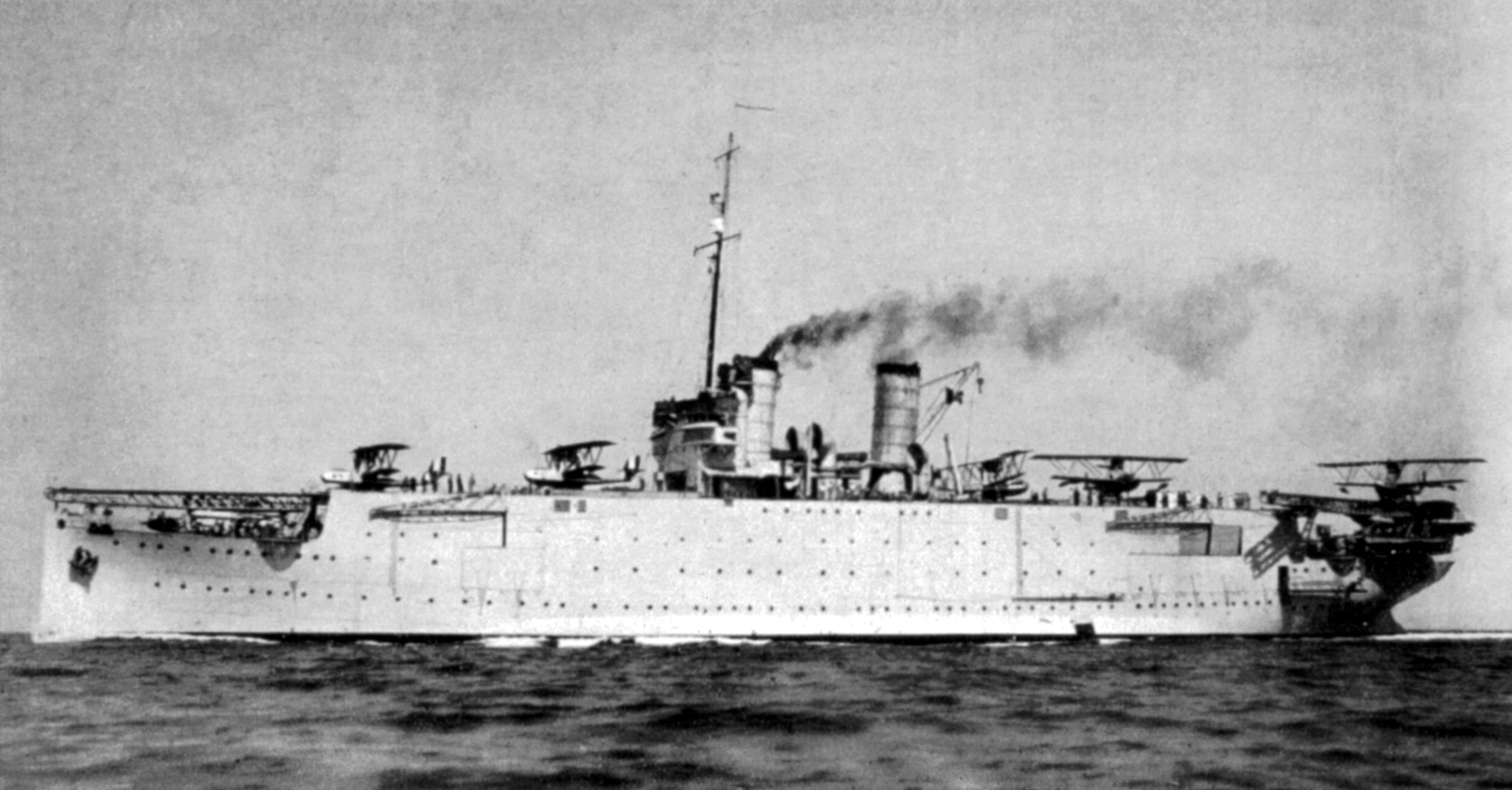
1937 Official photo of the "Giuseppe Miraglia"

== See also ==
- List of seaplane carriers by country
