= Regia Marina =

Naval branch of Italian military; predecessor of the Marina Militare

Regia Marina (RM)
- Emblem of the Regia Marina
- Founded: 17 March 1861; 165 years ago
- Disbanded: 2 June 1946; 80 years ago
- Country: Kingdom of Italy
- Type: Navy
- Role: Naval warfare
- Engagements: Austro-Prussian War; Italo-Turkish War; World War I; Second Italo-Ethiopian War; Spanish Civil War; Italian invasion of Albania; World War II

Commanders
- Commander: Chief of Staff of the Navy
- Notable commanders: The Duke of the Abruzzi; Paolo Thaon di Revel; Inigo Campioni; Angelo Iachino; Angelo Ugo Conz

Insignia
- Naval Ensign

- Naval Jack

The Regia Marina (Italian for 'Royal Navy', pronounced [ˈrɛːdʒa maˈriːna]) (RM) or Royal Italian Navy was the navy of the Kingdom of Italy (Regno d'Italia) from 1861 to 1946. In 1946, with the birth of the Italian Republic (Repubblica Italiana), the Regia Marina changed its name to Marina Militare ("Military Navy").

== Origins ==
Regia Marina naval jack until 1900

The Regia Marina was established on 17 March 1861 following the proclamation of the formation of the Kingdom of Italy. Just as the Kingdom was a unification of various states in the Italian peninsula, so the Regia Marina was formed from the navies of those states, though the main constituents were the navies of the former kingdoms of Sardinia and Naples. The new Navy inherited a substantial number of ships, both sail- and steam-powered, and the long naval traditions of its constituents, especially those of Sardinia and Naples, but also suffered from some major handicaps.

Firstly and importantly, it suffered from a lack of uniformity and cohesion; the Regia Marina was a heterogeneous mix of equipment, standards and practice, and even saw hostility between the officers from the various former navies. These problems were compounded by the continuation of separate officer schools at Genoa and Naples, and were not fully addressed until the opening of a unified Naval Academy at Livorno in 1881.

Secondly, unification occurred during a period of rapid advances in naval technology and tactics, as typified by the launch of Gloire by France in 1858, and later by the appearance of, and battle between, USS Monitor and CSS Virginia in 1862. These innovations quickly made older warships obsolete. Italy did not possess the shipyards or infrastructure to build the modern ships required, but the then Minister for the Navy, Admiral Carlo di Persano, launched a substantial programme to purchase warships from foreign yards.

=== Seven Weeks War ===
The Sea Battle of Lissa, by Carl Frederik Sørensen, 1868

The new navy's baptism of fire came on 20 July 1866 at the Battle of Lissa during the Third Italian War of Independence (parallel to the Seven Weeks War). The battle was fought against the Austrian Empire and occurred near the island of Vis in the Adriatic Sea. That was one of the few fleet actions of the 19th century and as a major sea battle that involved ramming, it is often considered to have had a profound effect on subsequent warship design and tactics.

The Italian fleet, commanded by Admiral Persano, mustered 12 ironclad and 17 wooden-hulled ships, though only one, Affondatore, was of the most modern turret ship design. Despite a marked disadvantage in numbers and equipment, superior handling by the Austrians under Admiral Wilhelm von Tegetthoff resulted in a severe defeat for Italy, which lost two armoured ships and 640 men.

=== Decline and resurgence ===
After the war, the Regia Marina passed through some difficult years as the naval budget was substantially reduced, thus impairing the fleet's efficiency and the pace of new construction; only in the 1870s, under Simone Pacoret de Saint Bon's ministry, did the situation begin to improve. In 1881, the battleship Duilio was commissioned, followed in 1882 by the battleship Enrico Dandolo; at the time these were the most powerful warships in the world, and signalled the Italian fleet's renewed power. In 1896 the corvette Magenta completed a circumnavigation of the world. The following year the Regia Marina conducted experiments with Guglielmo Marconi in the use of radio communications. 1909 saw the first use of aircraft with the fleet. An Italian naval officer, Vittorio Cuniberti, was the first in 1903 to envision in a published article the all-big gun battleship design, which would be later come to be known as dreadnought.

=== Italo-Turkish War ===
In 1911 and 1912, the Regia Marina was involved in the Italo-Turkish War against forces of the Ottoman Empire. As the majority of the Ottoman Navy stayed behind the relative safety of the Dardanelles, the Italians dominated the Mediterranean during the conflict winning victories against Ottoman light units at the battles of Preveza and Beirut. In the Red Sea the Italian forces were vastly superior to those of the Ottomans who possessed only a squadron of gunboats there. These were destroyed while attempting to withdraw into the Mediterranean at the Battle of Kunfuda Bay.

== World War I ==
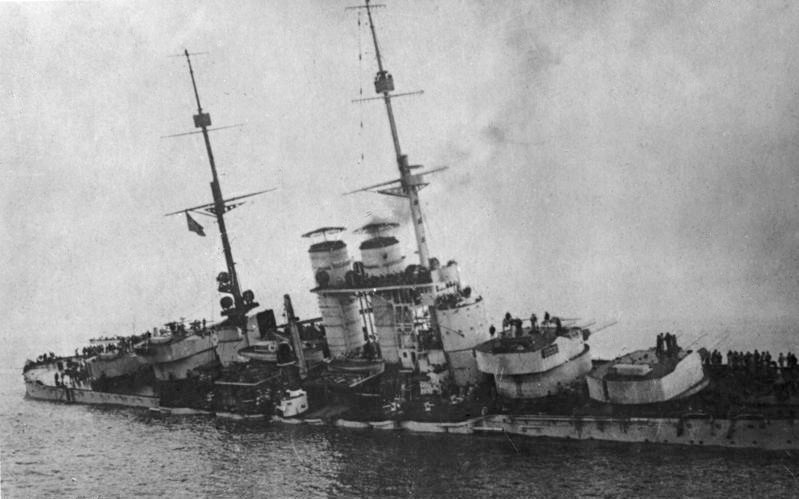
Szent István low in the water, after being torpedoed by Italian MAS boats

Before 1914, the Kingdom of Italy built six dreadnought battleships: (Dante Alighieri as a prototype; Giulio Cesare, Conte di Cavour and Leonardo da Vinci of the Conte di Cavour class; and Andrea Doria and Duilio of the Andrea Doria class), but they did not participate in any major naval actions in World War I.

During the war, the Regia Marina spent its minor efforts in the Adriatic Sea, opposing the Austro-Hungarian Navy. The resulting Adriatic Campaign of World War I consisted mainly of Austro-Hungarian coastal bombardments of Italy's Adriatic coast, and wider-ranging German/Austro-Hungarian submarine warfare into the Mediterranean. Allied forces mainly limited themselves to blockading the Austro-Hungarian navy inside the Adriatic, which was successful with regards to surface units, but failed for the submarines, which found safe harbours and easy passage into and out of the area for the whole of the war. Considered a relatively minor part of the naval warfare of World War I, it nonetheless tied down significant forces.

In December 1915, and January 1916, when the Serbian army was driven by the German forces under General von Mackensen toward the Albanian coast, 138,000 Serbian infantry and 11,000 refugees were ferried across the Adriatic and landed in Italy in 87 trips by the Conte di Cavour and other ships of the Italian Navy under the command of Admiral Conz. These ships also carried 13,000 cavalrymen and 10,000 horses of the Serbian army to Corfu in 13 crossings from the Albanian port of Vallons.

For most of the war the Italian navy avoided wherever possible the Austro-Hungarian navy. The Italian fleet lost the destroyer Turbine in 1915 to an Austro-Hungarian fleet sortie; the armoured cruiser Amalfi was sunk by Austrian submarine U-26 on 7 July 1915; the armoured cruiser Giuseppe Garibaldi, sunk by Austrian submarine U-4 on 18 July 1915, the pre-dreadnought battleship Benedetto Brin at Brindisi (27 September 1915) and the dreadnought Leonardo da Vinci at Taranto (2 August 1916) due to a magazine explosion (although there were rumours of Austrian sabotage). The Austrians also sank the Italian armed merchant cruiser SS Principe Umberto on 8 June 1916. While transporting troops in the Adriatic, the ship was sunk by Austro-Hungarian U-boat U-5 with the loss of 1,926 men. It was the worst naval disaster of World War I in terms of human lives lost.

In the last part of the war, the Regia Marina developed the MAS boats, that, by chance, managed to sink the Austro-Hungarian battleship SMS Szent István in the Adriatic Sea on 10 June 1918; and an early type of human torpedo (codenamed Mignatta, or "leech") carrying two men, which entered the harbour of Pola and planted two magnetic mines during the early hours of the morning which exploded sinking the Austro-Hungarian flagship SMS Viribus Unitis, with considerable loss of life, on 1 November 1918, shortly after the entire navy had been turned over to the newly founded neutral State of Slovenes, Croats and Serbs. The battleship SMS Tegetthoff (sister of the former two) was handed over to Italy as a war prize in 1919.

== Interwar years ==
During the interwar years the Italian government set about modernizing the Regia Marina in a way that could enable it to reach dominance over the Mediterranean Sea. Italian naval planners also wanted a force capable of taking on the British Royal Navy, especially after the Fascist takeover. The British response to the Corfu incident left Mussolini and his military advisors convinced that Italy was "imprisoned in the Mediterranean" through British bases in Gibraltar, the Suez Canal, Malta, and Cyprus. Italian naval construction was limited by the Washington Naval Conference. The 1922 treaty required a parity in naval forces between the Italian and French navies, with equality in total displacement in battleships and carriers. The treaty influenced the development of the Italian fleet over the years between the two world wars. Between the late twenties and early thirties a construction program began, focusing first on cruisers up to 10,000 tons, followed by the building of destroyers and submarines, and lastly the construction of the new Littorio-class battleships; plans were also put in place to modernize the Conte di Cavour-class and Andrea Doria-class battleships. Much of these new naval units were responses to French naval constructions, as the Marine nationale was seen until the mid-1930s as the most likely enemy in a hypothetical conflict.

The Regia Marina chose to build fast ships armed with longer ranged guns to give the Italian vessels the ability to minimize close contact with vessels of the Royal Navy, whose crews were more experienced. In theory this would allow them to engage or break off at their own choosing, and would allow them to hit the enemy when he could not yet hit back. New guns were developed with longer ranges than their British counterparts of similar caliber. Speed was emphasized in their new construction. Italian cruisers built in the 1920s, such as Giovanni delle Bande Nere were built with a newly designed and relatively thin armour. This would have a decisive role in a number of naval battles, including the Battle of Cape Spada. Later classes, such as the Zara and Raimondo Montecuccoli classes, were built to a more balanced design with thicker armor.

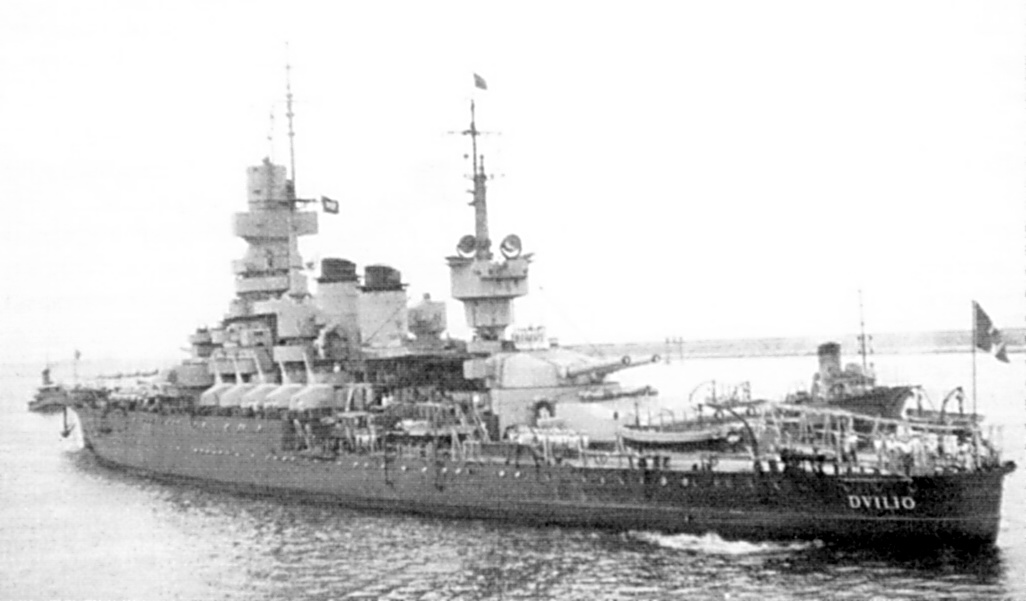
Duilio after refitting

The modernization work on the four Great War era battleships turned into a significant reconstruction project, with only 40% of the original structures being left. The ship's guns were upgraded in main armament, going from 13 guns of 305 mm diameter, to 10 guns of 320 mm diameter. The middle turret and the vessel's central tower were eliminated. To increase speed the coal-fired boilers were replaced with modern oil-fired boilers and ten meters were added to the ship's length to improve the coefficient of fineness. Though the ships were improved, they still were not an equal match for the Queen Elizabeth-class battleships and the Renown-class battlecruisers, both of which carried larger guns and heavier armour.

Though scientific research on tracking devices such as radar and sonar was being conducted in Italian universities and military laboratories by men such as Ugo Tiberio and Guglielmo Marconi, the conservative Italian leadership had little interest in these new technologies, and did not use them to improve the effectiveness of the Italian vessels. This was mainly due to the influence of Admiral Domenico Cavagnari, whom Mussolini appointed as Chief of Staff of the Navy in 1933, and whom he later promoted to Secretary of the Navy. Likewise technological advancement in radio range finders and gunnery control devices for night combat were not incorporated. Regarding such devices, Cavagnari emphasized "not wanting traps in your way". Writing to Admiral Iachino, he wrote "procedere con estrema cautela nell'accettare brillanti novità tecniche che non siano ancora collaudate da una esperienza pratica sufficientemente lunga", which can be translated to "proceed with extreme caution regarding brilliant technical innovations that have not yet been tested or with which there is no practical experience". Thus, the Italian navy entered the Second World War with a marked technical inferiority to the British Royal Navy. Albert Kesselring, overall commander of Axis forces in the Mediterranean, observed that the Italian navy was "a good weather" force, unable to operate effectively at night or in heavy seas.

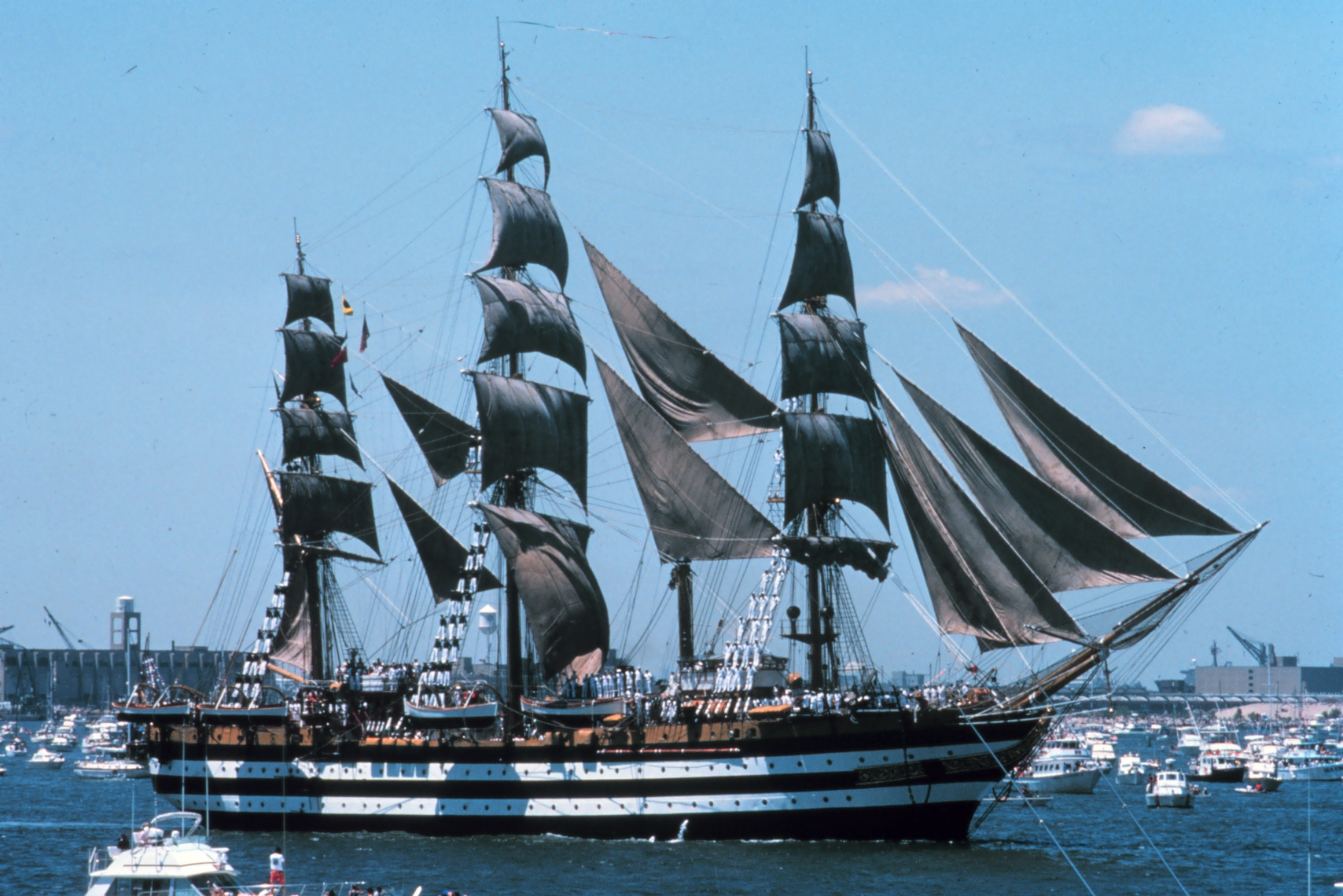
Amerigo Vespucci, launched in 1931; here in the harbor of New York, 1976

Two training ships were built during this period, in addition to the effort to modernize and re-equip the combat vessels of the navy. These were square rigged school ships the Regia Marina ordered in 1925. The sailing ships followed a design by Lieutenant Colonel Francesco Rotundi of the Italian Navy Engineering Corps, reminiscent of ships of the line from the Napoleonic era. The first of these two ships, Cristoforo Colombo, was put into service in 1928 and was used by the Italian Navy for training until 1943. After World War II, this ship was handed over to the Soviet Union as part of war reparations and was shortly afterwards decommissioned. The second ship of the design was Amerigo Vespucci. The ship was built in 1930 at the (formerly Royal) Naval Shipyard of Castellammare di Stabia (Naples). She was launched on 22 February 1931, and was put into service in July of that year. She is still being used to this day (2025).

In 1928, the unified command of the "Armata Navale" was abolished, and the fleet was divided in two squadrons (Squadre navali), one based at La Spezia and the other based at Taranto.

=== Italo-Ethiopian War ===
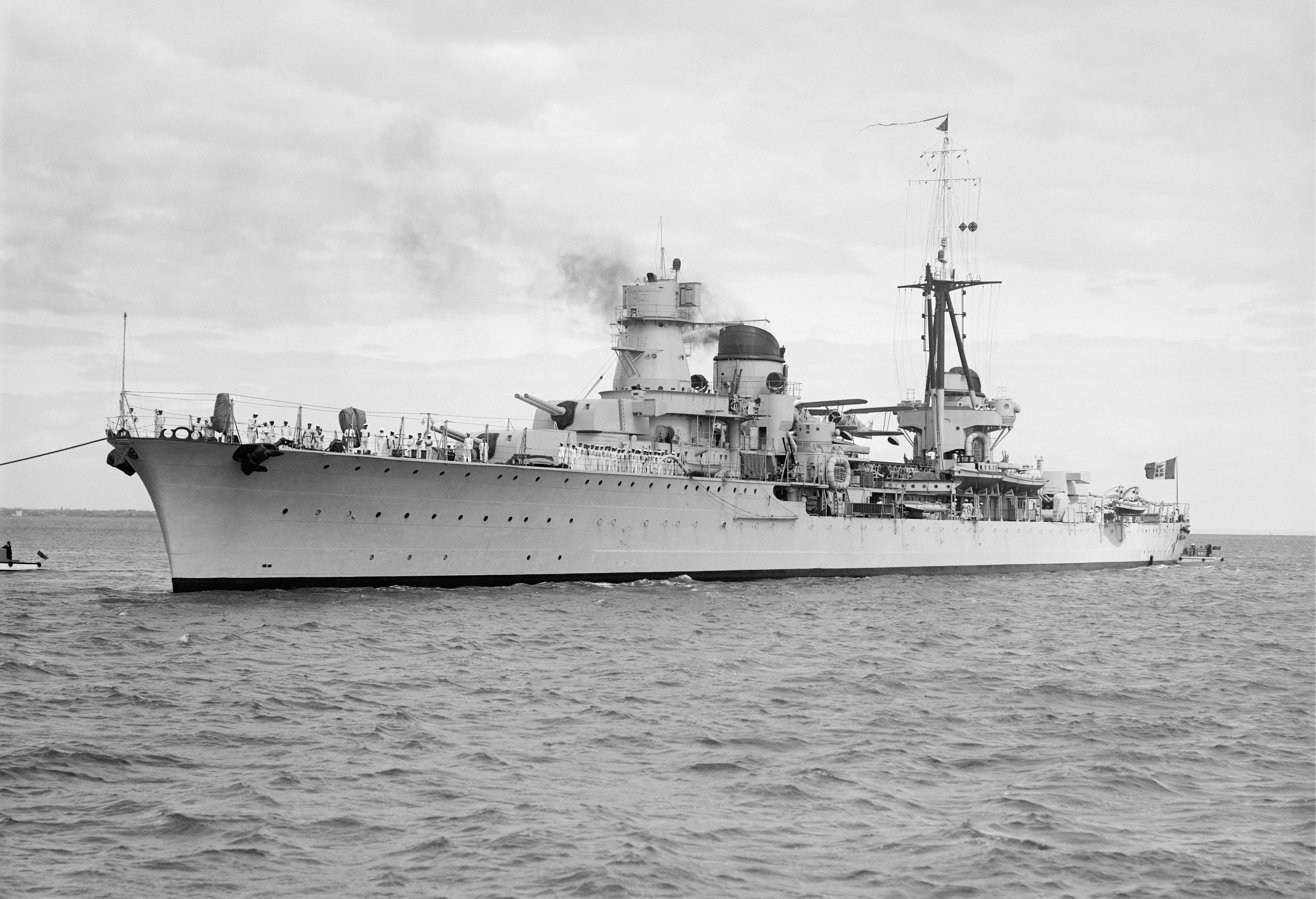
Cruiser Raimondo Montecuccoli during a visit to Australia in 1938

The Regia Marina played a limited role in the invasion of Ethiopia. While the Ethiopian Empire was landlocked, the navy was instrumental in delivering and supplying the invasion forces through Somali and Eritrean ports.

=== Spanish Civil War ===
At the time of the Italian intervention in the Spanish Civil War, the Regia Marina sent naval units in support of the Italian Corps of Volunteer Troops (Corpo Truppe Volontarie). Approximately 58 Italian submarines took part in operations against the Spanish Republican Navy. These submarines were organized in a Submarine Legion and complemented German Kriegsmarine U-boat operations as part of Operation Ursula. At least two Republican freighters, one Soviet and another Panamanian were either sunk or forced to run aground by Italian destroyers near the Strait of Sicily. Two light cruisers took part in the Bombing of Barcelona and Valencia in 1937, resulting in the deaths of more than 30 civilians.

=== Albania ===
In April 1939, the Regia Marina supported the invasion of Albania. All ground forces involved in the invasion had to cross the Adriatic Sea from mainland Italy and the crossings were accomplished without incident.

== World War II ==
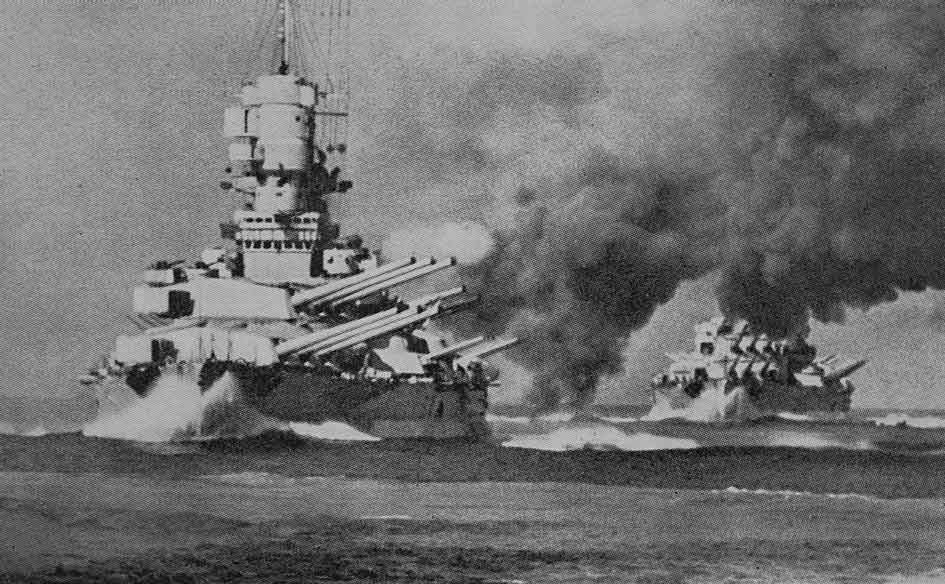
Vittorio Veneto and Littorio on trials

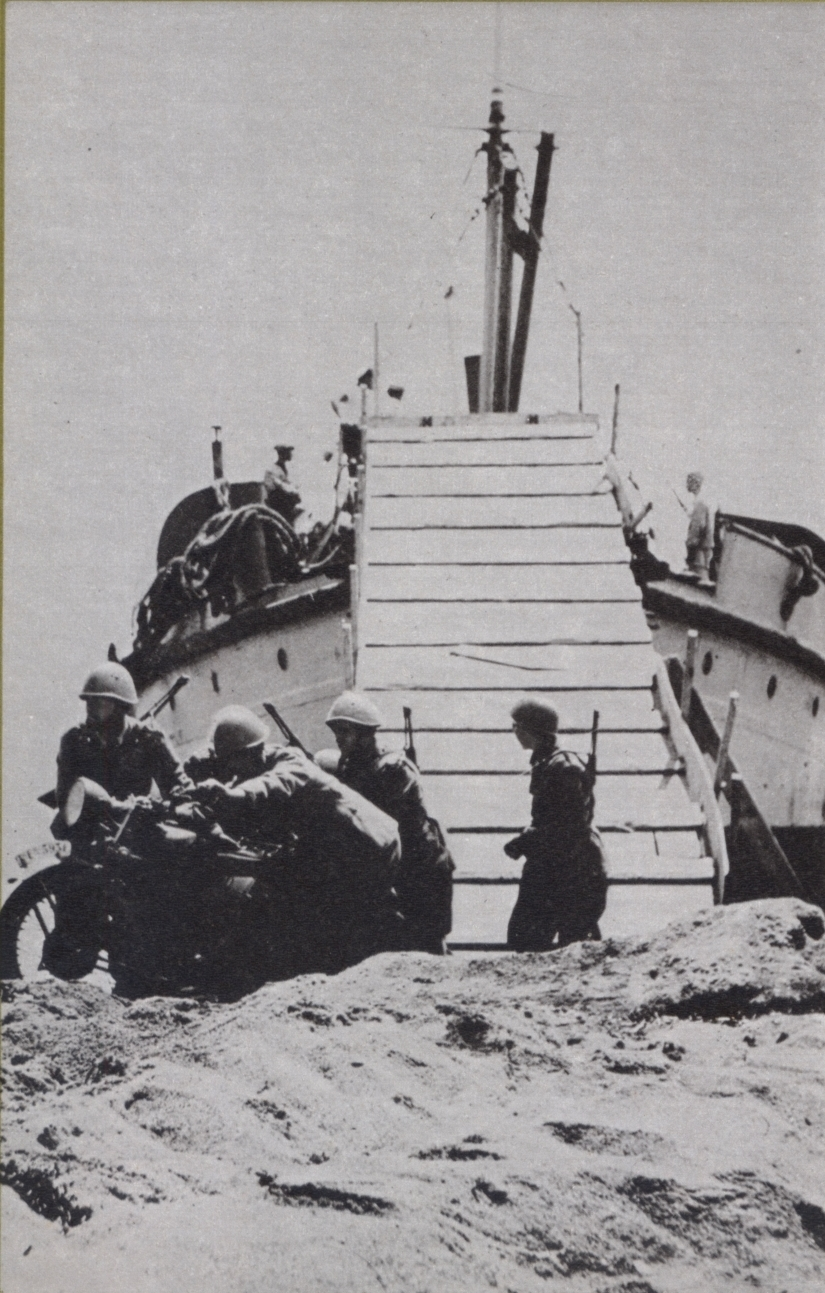
The Italian landing at Sitia, Crete, on 27 May 1941, was one of the few amphibious operations carried out by Italian forces.

On 10 June 1940, after the German invasion of France, Italy declared war on France and the United Kingdom and entered World War II. Italian dictator Benito Mussolini saw the control of the Mediterranean Sea as an essential prerequisite for expanding his "New Roman Empire" into Nice, Corsica, Tunis and the Balkans. Italian naval building accelerated during his tenure. Mussolini described the Mediterranean as "Mare Nostrum" (Our Sea).

Before the declaration of war, Italian ground and air forces had prepared to strike at the beaten French forces across the border in the Italian invasion of France. By contrast, the Regia Marina prepared to secure the lines of communications between Italy, Libya and the East African colonies. The Italian High Command (Comando Supremo) did not approve of the plan devised by the Italian Naval Headquarters (Supermarina) to occupy a weakly defended Malta, which proved a crucial mistake. British High Command, thinking that Malta could not be defended because of the proximity of Regia Aeronautica air bases in Italy, Sicily, and Libya, had put little effort into bolstering the islands' defences. Thus, at the outset of the war there were only 42 anti-aircraft guns on the island and twelve Gloster Sea Gladiators, half sitting in crates at the wharf.

Entering the war, the Regia Marina was operating under a number of limitations. Though significant assets were available to challenge the Royal Navy for control of the Mediterranean, there had been a lack of emphasis on the incorporation of technological advances such as radar and sonar. This meant that in night engagements or foul weather, the Italian ships were unable to detect the approach of their British adversaries. When engaged, they could only range their guns if they were able to visually locate their targets.

The Regia Marina had six battleships with which to contend for control of the Mediterranean, the four most modern of which were being re-fitted at the outbreak of the war. In addition to the six capital ships, the Italians had 19 cruisers, 59 destroyers, 67 torpedo boats, and 116 submarines. Though the Regia Marina had a number of fast new cruisers with good range in their gunnery, the older classes were lightly built and had inadequate defensive armor. Numerically the Italian fleet was formidable, but there were a large number of older vessels, and the service suffered in general from insufficient time at sea for crew training.

Italy's lack of raw materials meant that it would have great difficulty building new ships over the course of the war. Thus, the assets that it had were handled with caution by Supermarina. Allied commanders at sea had a fair degree of autonomy and discretion to fight their vessels as circumstance allowed, but Italian commanders were required to confer with their headquarters before committing their forces in an engagement that might result in their loss. That led to delays in arriving at decisions and actions being avoided even when the Italians had a clear advantage. An example occurred during "Operation Hats" in which the Regia Marina had superior forces but failed to commit them to take advantage of the opportunity.

A further key disadvantage in the convoy support and interception battles that dominated the Battle of the Mediterranean was the intelligence advantage granted to the British in intercepting German Ultra and, through this, the key information on Italian convoy routes, times of departure, time of arrival, and make up of the convoy.

The warships of the Regia Marina had a general reputation as being well-designed. Italian small attack craft lived up to expectations and were responsible for many successful actions in the Mediterranean. Though Italian warships lacked radar, that was partly offset in fair weather by good optical rangefinder and fire-control systems.

The Italian Navy lacked a fleet air arm. The High Command had reasoned that since the Italian navy would be operating solely in the Mediterranean, their vessels would never be far from an airfield and so the time and the resources needed to develop a naval air arm could be directed elsewhere. This proved problematic on a number of occasions. The Italians had the aircraft carriers Aquila and Sparviero under construction at the start of the war, but neither was ever completed. Lastly, the lack of natural oil reserves and subsequent shortage of oil precluded extensive fleet operations.

=== Mediterranean ===
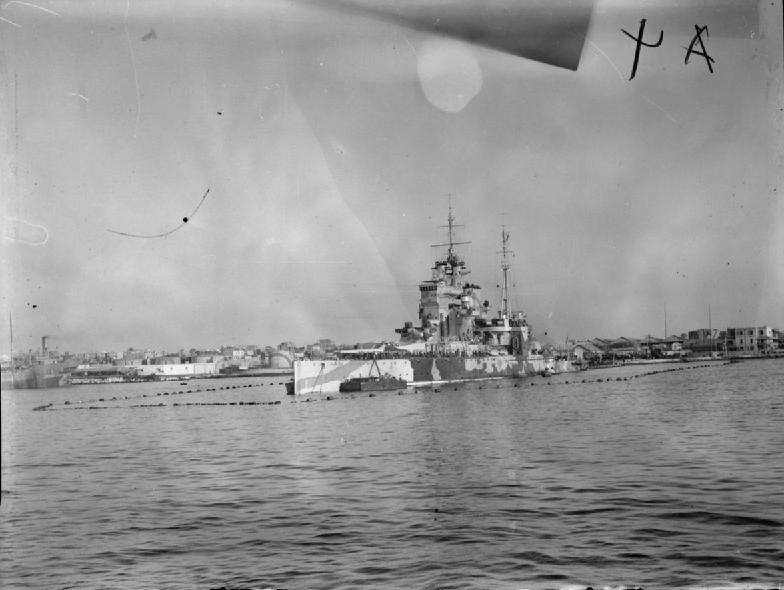
HMS Queen Elizabeth in Alexandria harbour surrounded by anti-torpedo nets. Regia Marina divers severely damaged her on 19 December 1941.

The Regia Marina and the Royal Navy engaged in a two-and-a-half-year struggle for control of the Mediterranean. The Regia Marina's primary goal was to support the Axis forces in North Africa while obstructing the supply route to Alexandria and cutting off supplies to Malta. The Royal Navy's major effort was to maintain supply to the military forces and people of Malta, and secondarily to interdict convoy shipments to North Africa. (Note: The British Official History states "All the major operations of the Royal Navy in the Mediterranean in 1942 prior to the Anglo-American landing in November (Operation Torch) were concerned with taking convoys into Malta.") The first major action occurred on 11 November 1940 when the British aircraft carrier HMS Illustrious launched two waves of Fairey Swordfish torpedo-bombers in a surprise raid against the Italian Fleet moored at the naval base of Taranto. The raid came in undetected, and three battleships were sunk. Another major defeat was inflicted on the Regia Marina at Cape Matapan, where the Royal Navy and the Royal Australian Navy intercepted and destroyed three heavy cruisers (Zara, Pola and Fiume; all of the same class) and two Oriani-class destroyers in a night ambush, with the loss of over 2,300 seamen. The Allies had broken the Italian codes and the Ultra intercepts uncovered the Italian movements and radar, which enabled them to locate the ships and range their weapons at distance and at night. The better air reconnaissance skills of the Royal Navy's Fleet Air Arm and their close collaboration with surface units were other major causes of the Italian debacle.

On 19 December 1941, the battleships HMS Queen Elizabeth and HMS Valiant were damaged by limpet mines planted by Italian frogmen, knocking both out of the conflict for almost two years. This action, coming on the heels of the loss of the Prince of Wales and Repulse in the South China Sea, significantly weakened the surface strength of the Royal Navy, making it difficult for them to challenge Italian control of the eastern Mediterranean. (Note: "Consequently, the Alexandria Fleet remained for many months without any battleships, and it was forced to abandon any further open activity. In fact, Admiral Cunningham wrote that his Fleet now should have to leave it to the Royal Air Force to try if they could dispute the control of the Central Mediterranean with the enemy's fleet.(...) In fact, it opened a period of clear Italian naval supremacy in the east-central Mediterranean".)

On the night of 19 December, Force K, comprising three cruisers and four destroyers based at Malta, ran into an Italian minefield off Tripoli. Three cruisers struck mines, with the cruiser HMS Neptune lost, along with the destroyer HMS Kandahar. In addition, another destroyer was seriously damaged. All told 800 seamen were lost, and Force K, which had been effectively interdicting Axis convoys, was put out of action. This series of successes allowed the Regia Marina to achieve naval supremacy in the central Mediterranean. Coupled with an intensive bombing campaign against Malta, the Axis supply routes from southern Europe to North Africa were almost untouched by the Royal Navy or its allies for the next several months.

HMS Bedouin sinking after being disabled by Italian cruisers and hit by an aerial torpedo during Operation Harpoon

The Italian fleet went on the offensive, blocking or mauling three large Allied convoys bound for Malta. This led to a number of naval engagements, including the Second Battle of Sirte in March 1942, Operation Harpoon and Operation Vigorous, (known as the "Battle of Mid-June") and Operation Pedestal (the "Battle of Mid-August"). All of these engagements ended favourably for the Axis. Despite this activity, the only real success of the Italian fleet was the surface attack on the Harpoon convoy, supported by Axis aerial forces. These attacks sank several Allied warships and damaged others. Only two transports of the original six in the convoy reached Malta. This was the only undisputed squadron-sized victory for Italian surface forces in World War II. (Note: "Clearly this was an Axis victory and a tactical victory for the Italian Navy. Part of the convoy did get through to Malta, but the British suffered far heavier losses than did the Italians and Mussolini would later personally present medals to Da Zara and some of his men for their efforts. It would be the only squadron-sized surface naval victory of the war for Italy.")

Despite the heavy losses suffered by the merchantmen and escorting forces of convoy Pedestal, the oil and supplies brought through allowed the near starving island of Malta to continue to hold out. With Allied landings in North Africa, Operation Torch, in November 1942, the fortunes of war turned against the Italians. Their sea convoys were harassed day after day by the aerial and naval supremacy of the Allies. The maritime lane between Sicily and Tunisia became known as the "route of death". After years of back and forth, the Axis forces were forced to surrender in Tunisia, bringing the campaign for North Africa to a close.

The Regia Marina performed well and bravely in its North African convoy duties, but remained at a technical disadvantage. The Italian ships relied on speed but could easily be damaged by shell or torpedo, due to their relatively thin armour, as happened in the Battle of Cape Spada. The fatal and final blow to the Italian Navy was a shortage of fuel, which forced its main units to remain at anchor for most of the last year of the Italian alliance with Germany.

=== Atlantic ===
From 10 June 1940, submarines of the Regia Marina took part in the Battle of the Atlantic alongside the U-boats of Nazi Germany's Kriegsmarine. The Italian submarines were based in Bordeaux, France at the BETASOM base. While more suited for the Mediterranean Sea than the Atlantic Ocean, the thirty-two Italian submarines that operated in the Atlantic sank 109 Allied ships for a total of 593,864 tons.

The Regia Marina even planned an attack on New York Harbor with midget submarines for December 1942, but this plan was delayed for many reasons and was never carried out.

=== Red Sea ===
Initially, Italian forces enjoyed considerable success in East Africa. From 10 June 1940, the Regia Marina's Red Sea Flotilla, based at Massawa, Eritrea, posed a potential threat to Allied shipping crossing the Red Sea between the Indian Ocean and the Mediterranean Sea. This threat increased in August 1940 with the Italian conquest of British Somaliland, which allowed the Italians the use of the port of Berbera; in January 1941, however, British and Commonwealth forces launched a successful counterattack in East Africa and the threat posed by the Red Sea Flotilla disappeared.

Much of the Red Sea Flotilla was destroyed by hostile action during the first months of war or when the port of Massawa fell in April 1941. However, there were a few survivors. In February 1941, prior to the fall of Massawa, the colonial ship Eritrea and the auxiliary cruisers Ramb I and Ramb II broke out and sailed to Kobe, Japan. While Ramb I was sunk by the Royal New Zealand Navy cruiser HMNZS Leander off the Maldives, Eritrea and Ramb II made it to Kobe. As the port of Massawa was falling, four submarines—Guglielmotti, Galileo Ferraris, Perla, and Archimede—sailed south from Massawa, rounded the Cape of Good Hope and ultimately sailed to German occupied Bordeaux, France. One or two Italian merchant ships from the Red Sea Flotilla made it to Vichy French-controlled Madagascar.

On 10 June 1941, the British launched Operation Chronometer, landing a battalion of troops from the British Indian Army at Assab, the last Italian-held harbour on the Red Sea. By 11 June, Assab had fallen. Two days later, on 13 June, the Indian trawler Parvati became the last naval casualty of the East African Campaign when it struck a moored mine near Assab.

=== Black Sea ===
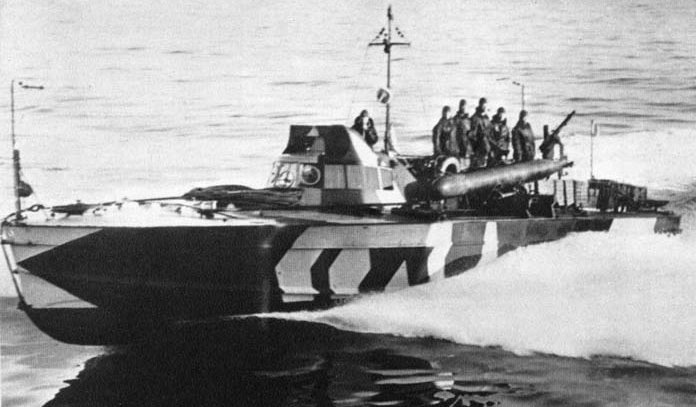
"Dazzle" painted Italian World War II MAS boat.

In May 1942, at German request, the Regia Marina deployed four 24-ton torpedo motorboats (Motoscafo Armato Silurante, MAS), six CB-class midget submarines, five torpedo motorboats, and five explosive motorboats to the Black Sea. The vessels were transported overland to the Danube River at Vienna, Austria, and then transported by water to Constanța, Romania. The flotilla had an active and successful campaign, based at Yalta and Feodosia.

After Italy quit the war (Armistice of Cassibile, September 1943) most of the Italian vessels on the Black Sea were transferred to Nazi Germany's Kriegsmarine. In early 1944, six MAS boats were transferred to the Royal Romanian Navy. By August 1944, they were ultimately captured by Soviet forces when Constanța was captured.

The five surviving midget submarines were transferred to the Royal Romanian Navy.

=== Lake Ladoga ===
The Regia Marina operated a squadron of four MAS boats on Lake Ladoga during the Continuation War (1941–1944). As part of Naval Detachment K, German, Italian, and Finnish vessels operated against Soviet gunboats, escorts and supply vessels during the Siege of Leningrad between 21 June and 21 October 1942. The Italian vessels were ultimately turned over to Finland.

=== Far East ===
The Regia Marina had a naval base in the concession territory of Tientsin in China. The primary Italian vessels based in China were the mine-layer Lepanto and the gunboat Carlotto. During World War II, Italian supply ships, auxiliary cruisers and submarines operated throughout the waters of the Far East, often in disguise. The Italians also utilized Japanese-controlled port facilities such as Shanghai, China, and Kobe, Japan.

Seven Italian submarines operating from occupied France were converted by the Italians into "transport submarines" in order to exchange rare or irreplaceable trade goods with Japan. The submarines Alpino Bagnolini, Barbarigo, Comandante Cappellini, Giuseppe Finzi, Reginaldo Giuliani, Enrico Tazzoli, and Luigi Torelli were converted for service with the Monsun Gruppe ("Monsoon Group"). The name of Comandante Cappellini was changed to Aquila III.

Twelve additional R-class blockade running transport submarines were specifically designed for trade with the Far East, but only two of these vessels were completed before Italy quit the war. Both of these submarines were destroyed by Allied action almost as soon as they were launched.

=== Armistice of 1943 ===
In 1943, Italian dictator Benito Mussolini was deposed and the new Italian government agreed to an armistice with the Allies. Under the terms of this armistice, the Regia Marina had to sail its ships to an Allied port. Most sailed to Malta, but a flotilla from La Spezia headed towards Sardinia. This was intercepted and attacked by German aircraft and the battleship Roma was sunk by two hits from Fritz X guided glide-bombs. Among the 1600 sailors killed on board Roma was the Italian Naval Commander-in-Chief, Admiral Carlo Bergamini.

As vessels became available to the new Italian government, the Italian Co-Belligerent Navy was formed to fight on the side of the Allies. Other ships were captured in port by the Germans or scuttled by their crews. Few Regia Marina crews chose to fight for Mussolini's new fascist regime in northern Italy, the Italian Social Republic (Repubblica Sociale Italiana, RSI). Mussolini's pro-German National Republican Navy (Marina Nazionale Repubblicana) hardly reached a twentieth the size attained by the co-belligerent Italian fleet. In the Far East, the Japanese occupied the Italian concession territory of Tiensin.

There was little use for the surrendered Italian battleships and there was doubt about the loyalties of the crews, so these ships were interned in Egypt. In June 1944, the less powerful battleships (Andrea Doria, Duilio and Giulio Cesare) were allowed to return to Augusta harbour in Sicily for training. The others, Vittorio Veneto and Italia (ex-Littorio), remained at Ismaïlia in the Suez Canal until 1947. After the war, Giulio Cesare was passed to the Soviet Union.

In the Co-belligerency period, until "VE" (Victory in Europe) Day, Italian light cruisers participated in the naval war in the Atlantic Ocean with patrols against German raiders. Smaller naval units (mainly submarines and torpedo boats) served in the Mediterranean Sea. In the last days of war, the issue of whether Italian battleships and cruisers should participate in the Pacific War was debated by the Allied leaders.

There were also Italian naval units in the Far East in 1943 when the new Italian government agreed to an armistice with the Allies. The reactions of their crews varied greatly. In general, surface units, mainly supply ships and auxiliary cruisers, either surrendered at Allied ports (Eritrea at Colombo, Ceylon) or, if in Japanese controlled ports, they were scuttled by their own crew (Conte Verde, Lepanto, and Carlotto at Shanghai). Ramb II was taken over by the Japanese in Kobe and renamed Calitea II. Four Italian submarines were in the Far East at the time of the armistice, transporting rare goods to Japan and Singapore: Ammiraglio Cagni, Comandante Cappellini (Aquilla III), Reginaldo Giuliani, and Luigi Torelli. The crew of Ammiraglio Cagni heard of the armistice and surrendered to the Royal Navy off Durban, South Africa. Comandante Cappellini, Reginaldo Giuliani, and Luigi Torelli and their crews were temporarily interned by the Japanese. The boats passed to German U-boat command and, with mixed German and Italian crews, they continued to fight against the Allies. The German navy assigned new officers to the three submarines. The three were renamed UIT-23, UIT-24 and UIT-25 and took part in German war operations in the Pacific. Reginaldo Giuliani was sunk by the British submarine HMS Tally-Ho in February 1944. In May 1945, the other two vessels were taken over by the Japanese Imperial Navy when Germany surrendered.
About twenty Italian sailors continued to fight with the Japanese. Luigi Torelli remained active until 30 August 1945, when, in Japanese waters, this last Fascist Italian submarine shot down a North American B-25 Mitchell bomber of the United States Army Air Forces.

== After World War II ==
After the end of hostilities, the Regia Marina started a long and complex rebuilding process. At the beginning of the war, the Regia Marina was the fourth largest navy in the world with a mix of modernised and new battleships. The important combat contributions of the Italian naval forces after the signing of the armistice with the Allies on 8 September 1943 and the subsequent cooperation agreement on 23 September 1943 left the Regia Marina in a poor condition. Much of its infrastructure and bases were unusable and its ports mined and blocked by sunken ships. However, a large number of its naval units had survived the war, albeit in a low efficiency state. This was due to the conflict and the age of many vessels.

The vessels that remained were:

- 2 incomplete and damaged aircraft carriers
- 5 battleships
- 9 cruisers
- 11 destroyers
- 22 frigates
- 19 corvettes
- 44 fast coastal patrol units
- 50 minesweepers
- 16 amphibious operations vessels
- 2 school ships
- 1 support ship and plane transport
- various submarine units

On 2 June 1946, the Italian monarchy was abolished by a popular referendum. The Kingdom of Italy (Regno d'Italia) ended and was replaced by the Italian Republic (Repubblica Italiana). The Regia Marina became the Navy of the Italian Republic (Marina Militare).

== Peace treaty ==
On 10 February 1947, a peace treaty was signed in Paris between the Italian Republic and the victorious powers of World War II. The treaty was onerous for the Italian Navy. Apart from territorial and material losses, the following restrictions were imposed:

- A ban on owning, building or experimenting with atomic weapons, self-propulsion projectiles or related launchers
- A ban on owning battleships, aircraft carriers, submarines and amphibious assault units.
- A ban on operating military installations on the islands of Pantelleria and Pianosa; and the Pelagian Islands.
- The total displacement, battleships excluded, of the future navy was not allowed to be greater than 67,500 tons, while the staff was capped at 25,000 men.

The treaty also ordered Italy to put the following ships at the disposals of the victorious nations United States, Soviet Union, Great Britain, France, Greece, Yugoslavia, and Albania as war compensation:

- 3 battleships: Giulio Cesare, Italia, Vittorio Veneto;
- 5 cruisers: Emanuele Filiberto Duca d'Aosta, Attilio Regolo, Scipione Africano, Eugenio di Savoia and Eritrea;
- 7 destroyers; 5 of the Soldati class, Augusto Riboty and Alfredo Oriani;
- 6 minesweepers;
- 8 submarines, including three of the Acciaio class;
- 1 sailing school ship: Cristoforo Colombo.

The convoy escort Ramb III ultimately became the Yugoslav Navy yacht Galeb. Galeb was used by the President of the Socialist Federal Republic of Yugoslavia Marshal Josip Broz Tito on his numerous foreign trips and to entertain heads of state.

== Ships ==
=== World War I ===
==== Battleships ====
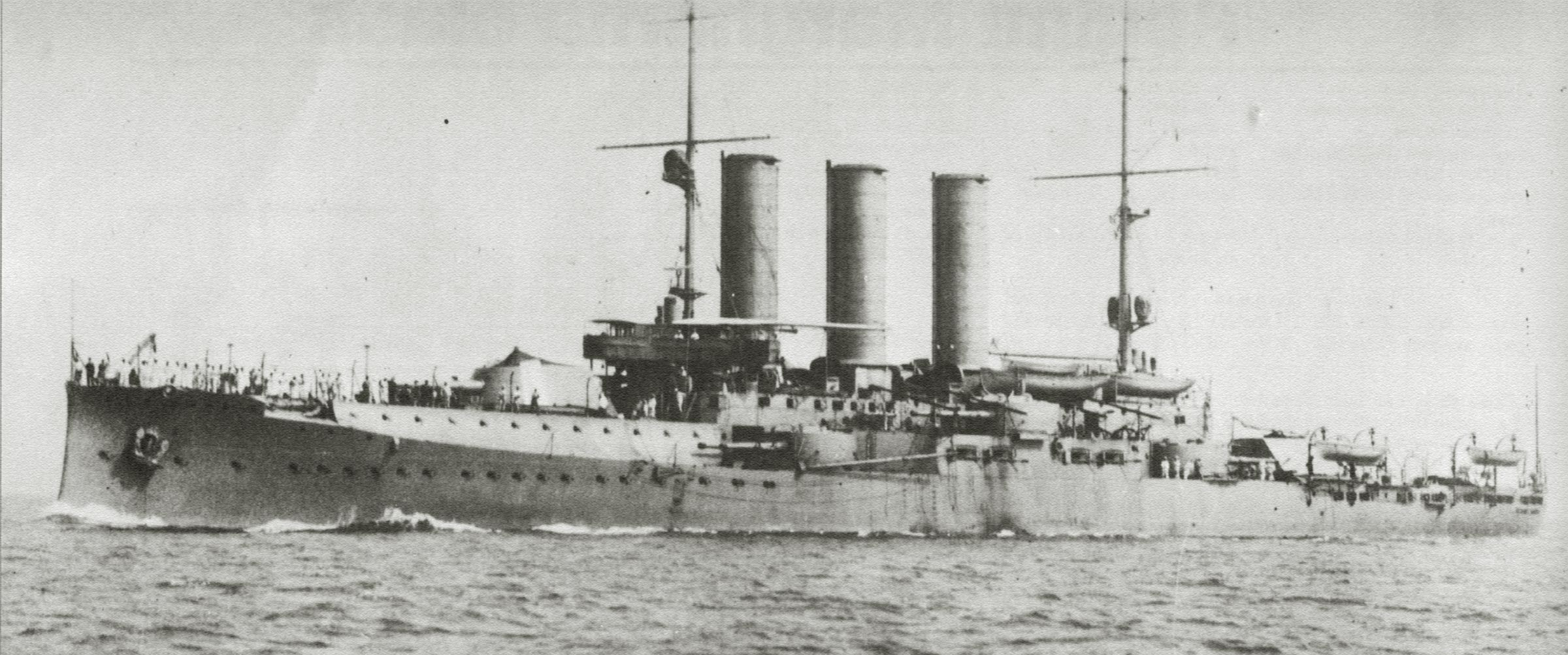
Vittorio Emanuele battleship during WWI

=== World War II ===
==== Aircraft carriers ====
- Aquila (modification of the liner Roma, built but never used)
- Sparviero (modification of the liner Augustus, never completed)

==== Seaplane carriers ====
- Giuseppe Miraglia (extensively converted merchant ship Città di Messina for the seaplane carrier role, commissioned as a seaplane transport by 1940)

==== Battleships ====
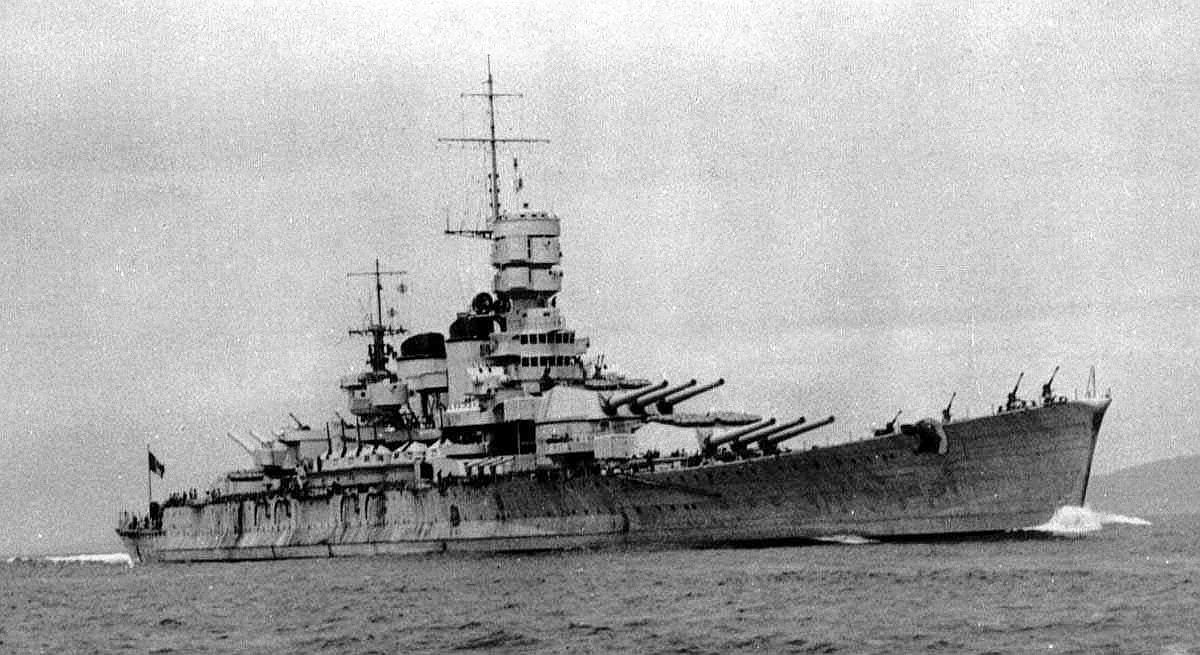
Roma in 1940

==== Aviation and transport cruisers ====
- Bolzano class: Bolzano aviation and transport cruiser (as regular heavy cruiser, extensively damaged by submarine torpedoes and proposed for reconstruction to a hybrid carrier/transport design)

==== Torpedo boats ====
- Spica class: 30 vessels
  - Airone
  - Alcione
  - Aldebaran
  - Altair
  - Andromeda
  - Antares
  - Aretusa
  - Ariel
  - Astore
  - Calipso
  - Calliope
  - Canopo
  - Cassiopea
  - Castore
  - Centauro
  - Cigno
  - Circe
  - Climene
  - Clio
  - Libra
  - Lince
  - Lira
  - Lupo
  - Pallade
  - Partenope
  - Perseo
  - Pleiadi
  - Polluce
  - Sagittario
  - Sirio
  - Spica
  - Vega
- Rosolino Pilo class: 7 vessels
- Audace class: 1 vessel
  - Audace
- Giuseppe Sirtori class: 4 vessels
- La Masa class: 7 vessels
- Palestro class: 4 vessels
  - Palestro
  - Confienza
  - San Martino
  - Solferino
- Generali class: 6 vessels
  - Generale Antonio Cantore
  - Generale Antonio Cascino
  - Generale Antonio Chinotto
  - Generale Carlo Montanari
  - Generale Marcello Prestinari
  - Generale Achille Papa
- Curtatone class: 4 vessels
  - Calatafimi
  - Castelfidardo
  - Curtatone
  - Monzambano
- Orsa class: 4 vessels
  - Pegaso
  - Procione
  - Orione
  - Orsa
- Ciclone class: 16 vessels
  - Aliseo
  - Animoso
  - Ardente
  - Ardimentoso
  - Ardito
  - Ciclone
  - Fortunale
  - Ghibli
  - Groppo
  - Impavido
  - Impetuoso
  - Indomito
  - Intrepido
  - Monsone
  - Tifone
  - Uragano
- Ariete class: 16 vessels
  - Alabarda
  - Ariete
  - Arturo
  - Auriga
  - Balestra
  - Daga
  - Dragone
  - Eridano
  - Fionda
  - Gladio
  - Lancia
  - Pugnale
  - Rigel
  - Spada
  - Spica
  - Stella Polare

==== Auxiliary cruisers ====
- Ramb class: 4 vessels (only 2 converted to auxiliary cruisers) – 3,667 t
  - Ramb I
  - Ramb II

== Ranks and ratings of the Navy ==
=== Fleet forces ===
==== Commissioned officer ranks ====
The rank insignia of commissioned officers.

| Rank group | General / flag officers | | | | | | Senior officers | | | Junior officers |
|---|---|---|---|---|---|---|---|---|---|---|---|---|---|---|
| (Italy) Royal Italian Navy |
| (Italy) Royal Italian Navy | Grande ammiraglio | Ammiraglio d'armata | Ammiraglio designato d'armata | Ammiraglio di squadra | Ammiraglio di divisione | Contrammiraglio | Capitano di vascello | Capitano di fregata | Capitano di corvetta | Primo tenente di vascello | Tenente di vascello | Sottotenente di vascello | Guardiamarina | Aspirante guardiamarina |

==== Other ranks ====
The rank insignia of non-commissioned officers and enlisted personnel.

| Rank group | Senior NCOs | | | | | Junior NCOs | Enlisted |
|---|---|---|---|---|---|---|---|---|
| (Italy) Royal Italian Navy | | | | | | | | No insignia |
| (Italy) Royal Italian Navy | Capo di Prima Classe | Capo di Seconda Classe | Capo di Terza Classe | Secondo Capo | Sergente | Sottocapo | Comune di 1ª classe | Comune di 2ª classe |

=== Technical services ===
==== Enlisted ratings, non-commissioned officers and warrant officers ====
- Comune di 2ª classe – Seaman apprentice (historical equivalent in the British Navy, ordinary seaman)
- Comune di 1ª classe – Seaman (historical equivalent in the British Nave, able bodied seaman)
- Sottocapo – Leading seaman
- Sergente – Petty officer 2nd class
- Secondo capo – Petty officer 1st class
- Capo di terza classe – Chief petty officer 2nd class
- Capo di seconda classe – Chief petty officer 1st class
- Capo di prima classe – Warrant officer

==== Officers ====
- Aspirante – Aspirant (roughly equivalent to midshipman in the British Navy)
- Sottotenente (Sublieutenant) – Second Lieutenant
- Tenente – Lieutenant
- Primo Tenente – First Lieutenant
- Capitano – Captain
- Primo Capitano – First Captain
- Maggiore – Major
- Tenente Colonello – Lieutenant Colonel
- Colonello – Colonel
- Colonello Comandante – Colonel commandant
- Maggiore Generale – Major General
- Tenente Generale – Lieutenant general
- Generale ispettore – General

== Gallery ==
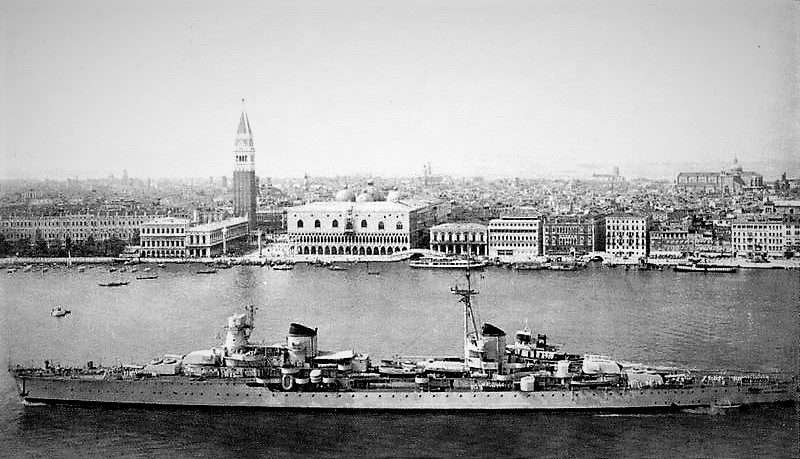
Cruiser Raimondo Montecuccoli in Venice in 1941

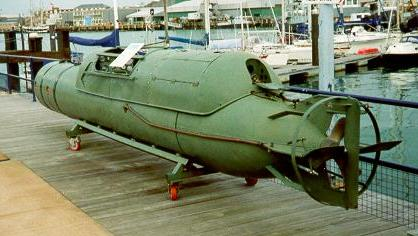
Original Maiale (manned torpedo) on display

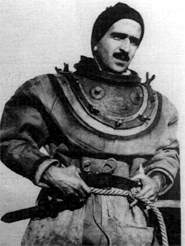
Major Teseo Tesei, inventor of the Maiale, ready to ride one in Malta.

Italian submarine Adua, sunk in September 1941 near Gibraltar.

The destroyer Sella, one of the major Italian navy units in the Aegean Sea

Auxiliary ship Olterra, outfitted as a secret base for manned torpedoes at Algeciras

Light cruiser Eugenio di Savoia, Admiral Da Zara's flagship during the battle of Mid-June (1942)

== See also ==
- Italian concession of Tianjin
- Italian Co-belligerent Navy
- List of battleships of Italy
- Lists of ships of World War II
- Naval history of World War II
- Regia Aeronautica
- Royal Italian Army
