= National Republican Navy (Italy) =

- Active: September 1943–May 1945
- Country: Italian Social Republic
- Allegiance: Benito Mussolini
- Branch: Navy
- Engagements: Second World War

Commanders
- Notable commanders: Umberto Bardelli

The National Republican Navy (Italian: Marina Nazionale Repubblicana) was the navy of the Italian Social Republic, a World War II German puppet state in Italy.

== History ==
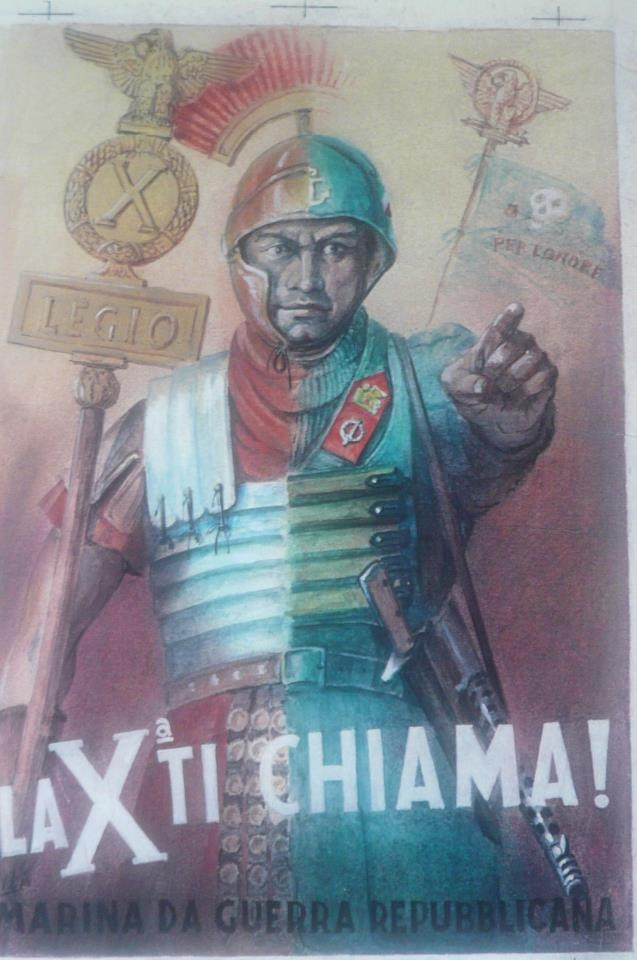
MNR recruitment poster

The Marina Nazionale Repubblicana was formally created in late September 1943, following the establishment of the Italian Social Republic. Most of the Regia Marina fleet, however, after the Armistice of Cassibile between Italy and the Allies on 3 September 1943, had sailed to Allied-controlled ports (chiefly Malta), and the few ships that remained in Italian ports, most of them undergoing maintenance or repair, were either scuttled or captured by the German forces and incorporated into the Kriegsmarine. The MNR was thus left without a real fleet; even ships abandoned during construction in Northern Italian shipyards (among them many Gabbiano-class corvettes and Ariete-class torpedo boats) were completed for the German Kriegsmarine, that refused to transfer any of them to the MNR.

The first Chief of Staff of the MNR was Admiral Antonio Legnani, who however died in a car crash less than a month after the creation of the MNR. He was succeeded by Captain Ferruccio Ferrini. Junio Valerio Borghese's Decima Flottiglia MAS was formally part of the MNR, but it operated as a de facto independent unit under Borghese's undisputed leadership. Ferrini did not tolerate this independence; he accused Borghese of having contacts with the Allies and the anti-Communist partisans, and of conspiring to depose Mussolini and replace him at the head of the RSI. In January 1944 Borghese was summoned by Mussolini and placed under arrest, but this immediately brought the Decima MAS personnel on the verge of mutiny; the situation settled after Borghese was released, following German intervention.

The fleet of the MNR never amounted to more than a small number of MAS, submarine chasers, midget submarines and assault craft, the latter operated by the Decima Flottiglia MAS. Part of the personnel recruited by the MNR served on Kriegsmarine ships in the Mediterranean, whereas others manned coastal batteries in Northern Italy. Other personnel fought on land alongside the National Republican Army and the Wehrmacht

== Size and ships ==
The Marina Nazionale Repubblicana only reached a twentieth the size of the Allied Italian fleet, and consisted of nine motor torpedo boats (two large and seven small), dozens of MTSM small motor torpedo boats and MTM explosive motorboats. The National Republican Navy also operated fifteen CB-class midget submarines (ten in the Adriatic and five in the Black Sea) and one larger submarine, CM 1, as well as the auxiliary submarine chasers Equa and Antonio Landi, the trawlers Cefalo and Pegaso, and a flotilla of minesweepers based in Venice.

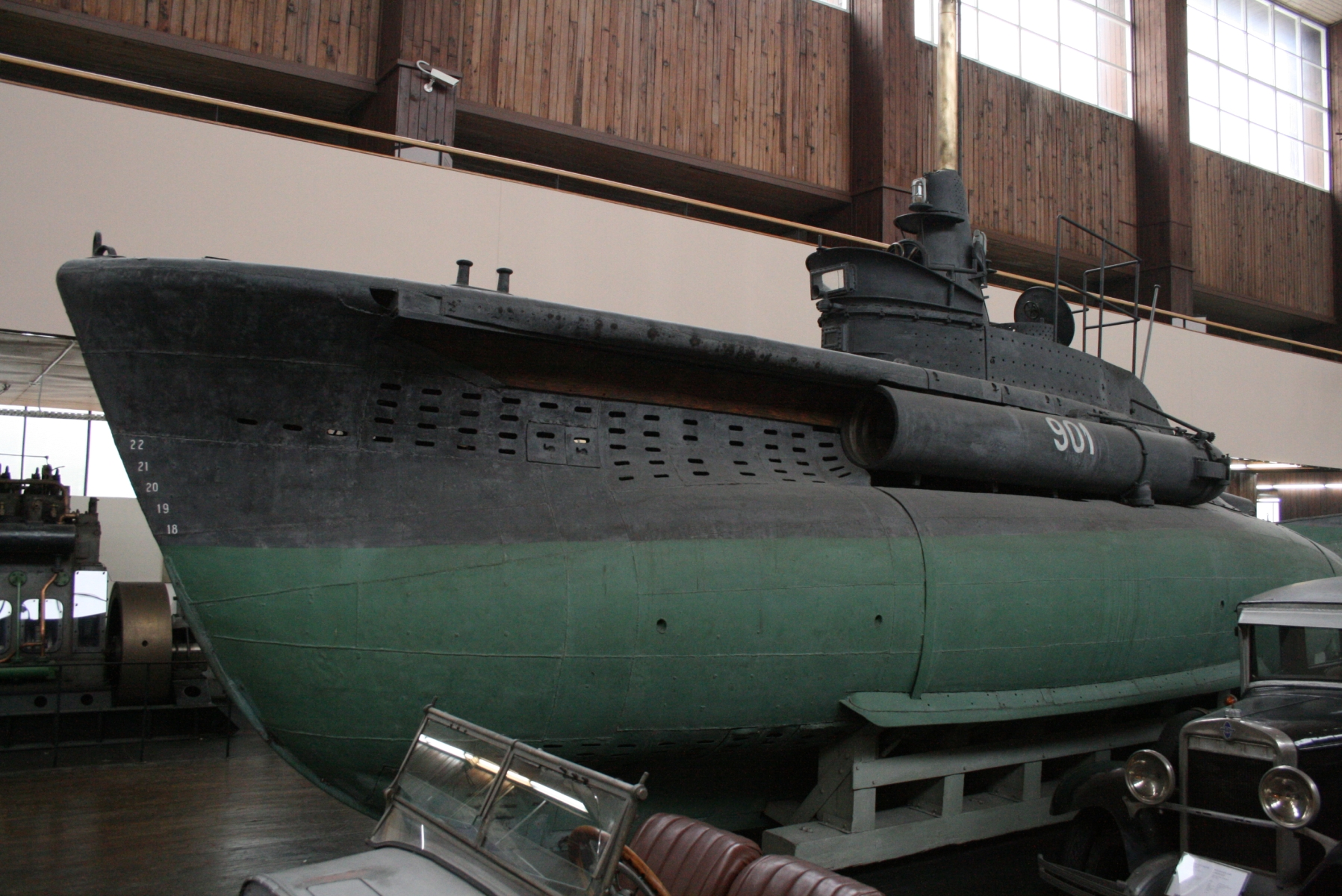
CB-20, a midget submarine operated by the MNR.

An unknown number of MTSMs were active with the navy of the Italian Social Republic. Most of their operations took place in the Adriatic Sea, sometimes with mixed Italian and German crews.

Of their CB midget class submarines, five were initially given to the Italian Social Republic by Germany, but later ten more boats were transferred by the Germans to the RSI Navy and served in the Adriatic. One was used for spare parts, seven were sunk and two were captured by the Allies.

== Operational history ==
Due to its small size, activity by MNR mainly consisted in coastal patrolling and minelaying operations, as well as some limited offensive activity against Allied shipping with MAS and assault craft.

The only success by a MNR vessel came on 16 April 1945, a few weeks before its dissolution, when one MTM hit and heavily damaged the French destroyer Trombe off Liguria, Italy. In late April 1945, the MNR ceased to exist following the liberation of Northern Italy and the fall of the Italian Social Republic.

Many MNR and Decima MAS personnel stationed in Istria became victims of the Foibe massacres between April and May 1945.

== List of ships ==
CB-class submarines:

- CB1: 27 January 1941–August 1944, scuttled
- CB2: 27 January 1941–August 1944, scuttled
- CB3: 10 May 1941–August 1944, scuttled
- CB4: 10 May 1941–August 1944, scuttled
- CB6: 10 May 1941–August 1944, scuttled
- CB7: 1 August 1943—?, scrapped
- CB13: Late 1943–23 March 1945, sunk
- CB14: Late 1943–?, sunk
- CB15: Late 1943–?, sunk
- CB16: Late 1943–?, captured by British forces
- CB17: Late 1943–3 April 1945, sunk
- CB18: Late 1943–31 March 1945, sunk
- CB19: Late 1943–1947, scrapped
- CB20: Late 1943–?, captured by Yugoslavia
- CB21: Late 1943– 29 April 1945, rammed by a Marinefährprahm.

VAS-class patrol boats:

- VAS 207
- VAS 225
- VAS 238
- VAS 252
- VAS 253
- VAS 255
- VAS 263

MTSM-class motorboat

- MTSM 204
- MTSM 230
- MTSM 234
- MTSM 268

MS-class speedboat

- MS 16
- MS 34
- MS 41
- MS 71
- MS 76

MAS-class

- MAS 433

- MAS 502 January 22, 1944–?
- MAS 504 26 October 1943–?
- MAS 505 April 10, 1944–?
- MAS 525 October 1943–?
- MAS 531 2 November 1943–?
- MAS 544 November 5, 1943–?
- MAS 549 1944–?
- MAS 551 1944–?
- MAS 553 November 1943–?
- MAS 554
- MAS 556 January 22, 1944–?
- MAS 557 11 October 1943–?
- MAS 558 November 8, 1943–?
- MAS 561 November 8, 1943–?
- MAS 562 November 8, 1943–?

== Ranks ==
=== Commissioned officer ranks ===
The rank insignia of commissioned officers.

Rank group	General / flag officers			Senior officers			Junior officers
National Republican Navy
National Republican Navy	Ammiraglio	Vice ammiraglio	Contrammiraglio	Capitano di vascello	Capitano di fregata	Capitano di corvetta	Tenente di vascello	Sottotenente di vascello	Guardiamarina

=== Other ranks ===
The rank insignia of non-commissioned officers and enlisted personnel.

Rank group	Senior NCOs					Junior NCOs	Enlisted
National Republican Navy								No insignia
National Republican Navy	Capo di prima classe	Capo di seconda classe	Capo di terza classe	Secondo capo	Sergente	Sottocapo	Comune di 1ª classe	Comune di 2ª classe
