= Luigi Biancheri =

Italian admiral (1891–1950)

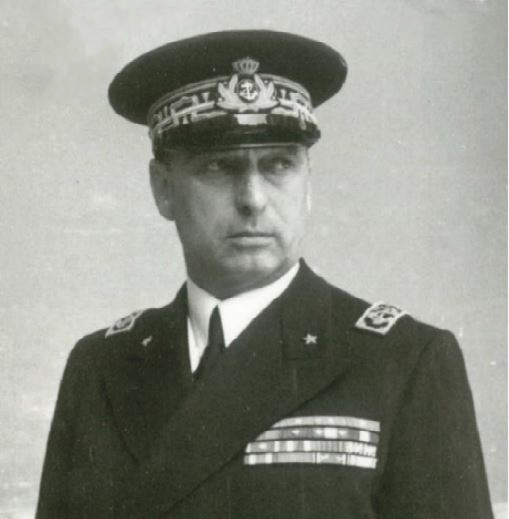
- Born: 31 January 1891; Genoa, Ligury, Italy
- Died: 5 December 1950 (aged 59); Rome, Latium, Italy
- Military career
- Allegiance: Kingdom of Italy
- Branch: Regia Marina
- Service years: 1907–1950
- Rank: Ammiraglio di Divisione (Vice Admiral)
- Commands: Trieste (heavy cruiser); Naval Command Dodecanese; 12th Naval Division; Naval Command Tunisia; 8th Naval Division; Naval Command Sicily
- Conflicts: Italo-Turkish War; World War I; Adriatic Campaign; World War II; Battle of the Mediterranean; Operation Abstention; Raid on Souda Bay; Tunisian campaign
- Awards: Silver Medal of Military Valor (three times); Bronze Medal of Military Valor; Military Order of Savoy

Luigi Biancheri (31 January 1891 – 12 December 1950) was an Italian admiral during World War II.

== Early life and career ==
Biancheri was born in Genoa in 1891 and entered the Royal Naval Academy in Livorno in 1907, graduating as an ensign on 1 April 1911. He participated in the Italo-Turkish War as part of the crew of the armoured cruiser Amalfi, and then served on board smaller ships during the earlier part of World War I. In July 1917, he was assigned to the Brigata Marina and he subsequently fought for the whole duration of the land campaign, receiving two Silver Medals of Military Valor and one Bronze Medal of Military Valor.

After the end of the war, Biancheri was given a command in the Livorno MAS flotilla and then, in June and July 1919, he was part of the Italian expeditionary force in Anatolia. He also commanded coastal batteries along the Northern Adriatic coast. Between 1933 and 1935, he taught Art of Naval Warfare at the Warfare School in Turin, and in 1937, he was assigned to the Submarine Fitting Office in Rome. Between 1937 and 1938, with the rank of captain, he commanded the heavy cruiser Trieste. He later served for some time on destroyers and light cruisers, and in 1939, he was promoted to rear admiral. In December 1939, Biancheri was appointed commander of the Italian naval forces in the Aegean Sea (with seat in Rhodes), an office that he would hold for two and a half years.

== World War II and aftermath ==
The forces under Biancheri's command, at the start of the war, were rather limited: two old destroyers, four torpedo boats, eight submarines, five MAS motor torpedo boats, one minelayer, one auxiliary minelayer and three gunboats. This prevented from launching heavy attacks on British naval traffic in the Aegean; as a result, only two British merchant ships were damaged by Italian naval forces in the Aegean Sea, one of them permanently; the first on 19 January 1941, when the Italian submarine Neghelli (later sunk by the escorts) torpedoed the cargo ship Clan Cumming and on 31 January, when the Italian torpedo boats Lupo and Libra torpedoed and disabled the tanker Desmoulea for the rest of the war. Operations in the Dodecanese, however, were quite uneventful, and Biancheri's forces were mainly tasked with escorting ships between the islands and (after the fall of Greece) between the islands and Greece (British attacks on these ships were scarce), whereas his submarines were deployed in the Aegean but had few encounters with the enemy. Aircraft based in Rhodes and Leros carried out bombings against Haifa and Nicosia and, during the Greco-Italian War, against Greek naval and air bases.

The main operation Biancheri was involved in the Italian counterattack after Operation Abstention: on 25 February 1941, a British force of 200 commandos and 24 Royal Marines seized the island of Kastelorizo, capturing its small garrison. Biancheri immediately sailed with a force that included the destroyers Francesco Crispi and Quintino Sella, the torpedo boats Lupo and Lince and two MAS, to reconquer the island. Between 27 and 28 February, the Italian warships shelled the British positions and landed 240 soldiers, who recaptured Kastelorizo, forcing the British commando force to withdraw, and took twelve prisoners. Biancheri received a third Silver Medal of Military Valor, and later the Military Order of Savoy, for the reconquest of Kastelorizo.

In March 1941, Biancheri participated in the planning of the successful Raid on Souda Bay, carried out by Tenth Light Flotilla members who had been brought near Suda by the destroyers Crispi and Sella. In May 1941, Italian ships under the direction of Biancheri took part in the Battle of Crete, escorting convoys with German reinforcements and landing Italian troops at Sitia. On 1 December 1941, two Italian MAS boats engaged and forced to ran aground on the Turkish coast the Soviet icebreaker Anastas Mykoyan off Kastelorizo, while on route from the Dardanelles to Suez. In spite that the Soviet vessel was refloated and reached Haifa for repairs the next day, the action compelled the Turkish government to intern eight Soviet ships set to repeat the same journey. Biancheri left command of the Italian naval forces in the Aegean in May 1942.

Biancheri was then appointed commander of the 12th Naval Division for some time, and on 14 November 1942 he was placed in charge of the newly formed Italian Naval Command Tunisia, in Bizerte, where he participated in the convoy war during the Tunisian Campaign; he held this office till 6 February 1943, when he was replaced by Admiral Carlo Pinna. Between February and June 1943 Biancheri was Inspector of destroyers and torpedo boats, and on 10 August 1943 he was given command of the 8th Naval Division (light cruisers Attilio Regolo, Giuseppe Garibaldi and Luigi di Savoia Duca degli Abruzzi), with flag on Luigi di Savoia Duca degli Abruzzi, replacing Giuseppe Fioravanzo.

After the announcement of the Armistice of Cassibile, Biancheri was at first against the idea of surrendering the ships to the Allies, but he later complied with the orders and sailed from Genoa with his ships. He then joined the main force of Admiral Carlo Bergamini (which had sailed from La Spezia), heading for La Maddalena; in the afternoon of 9 September 1943 the Italian fleet was attacked by Luftwaffe bombers off Sardinia, and Biancheri ordered to return fire. Bergamini's flagship, Roma, was however hit by a Fritz-x guided glide bomb and quickly sank, and the command passed on to Admiral Romeo Oliva. Biancheri ordered the destroyers Mitragliere, Fuciliere and Carabiniere to rescue the survivors. Still reluctant to surrender the ships to the former enemies, and uncertain whether the attack had been carried out by German or Allied planes, Biancheri proposed Oliva to turn back to La Spezia, but Oliva refused and invited him to abide by the orders received. After the sinking of Roma, the Italian fleet headed for Malta; when the ships were already near the island, on 11 September, Biancheri broadcast a message to Oliva (which was received by all ships in the fleet) proposing to scuttle the fleet as soon as they entered the island's anchorages, but Oliva again rejected the suggestion after about an hour of reflection, and again invited Biancheri to comply with the orders, which he did. On the same day, the 8th Division anchored in St. Paul's Bay, Malta.

Biancheri retained his command of the 8th Division during the Italian co-belligerence with the Allies; between the end of 1943 and 15 February 1944 his ships were tasked with escort and patrol duties on Allied routes in the Atlantic.

After the end of the war, Biancheri first commanded Marisicilia (Naval Command Sicily, with seat in Messina) and then held various tasks at the Ministry of the Navy in Rome. He presided over a commission tasked with determining which former members of the Marina Nazionale Repubblicana and Decima Flottiglia MAS of the Italian Social Republic could be released from custody, and which ones needed to stay in prison. He was also a member of the Commission of the Italian Chess Federation. Biancheri died in Rome on 12 December 1950.
