= Psilander =

Psilander may refer to:

- HSwMS Psilander, several ships of the Swedish Navy
- Psilander-class destroyer

== People with the surname ==
- Valdemar Psilander (1884–1917), Danish actor
- Gustaf von Psilander (1669–1738), Swedish admiral
