= Italian torpedo boat Lince =

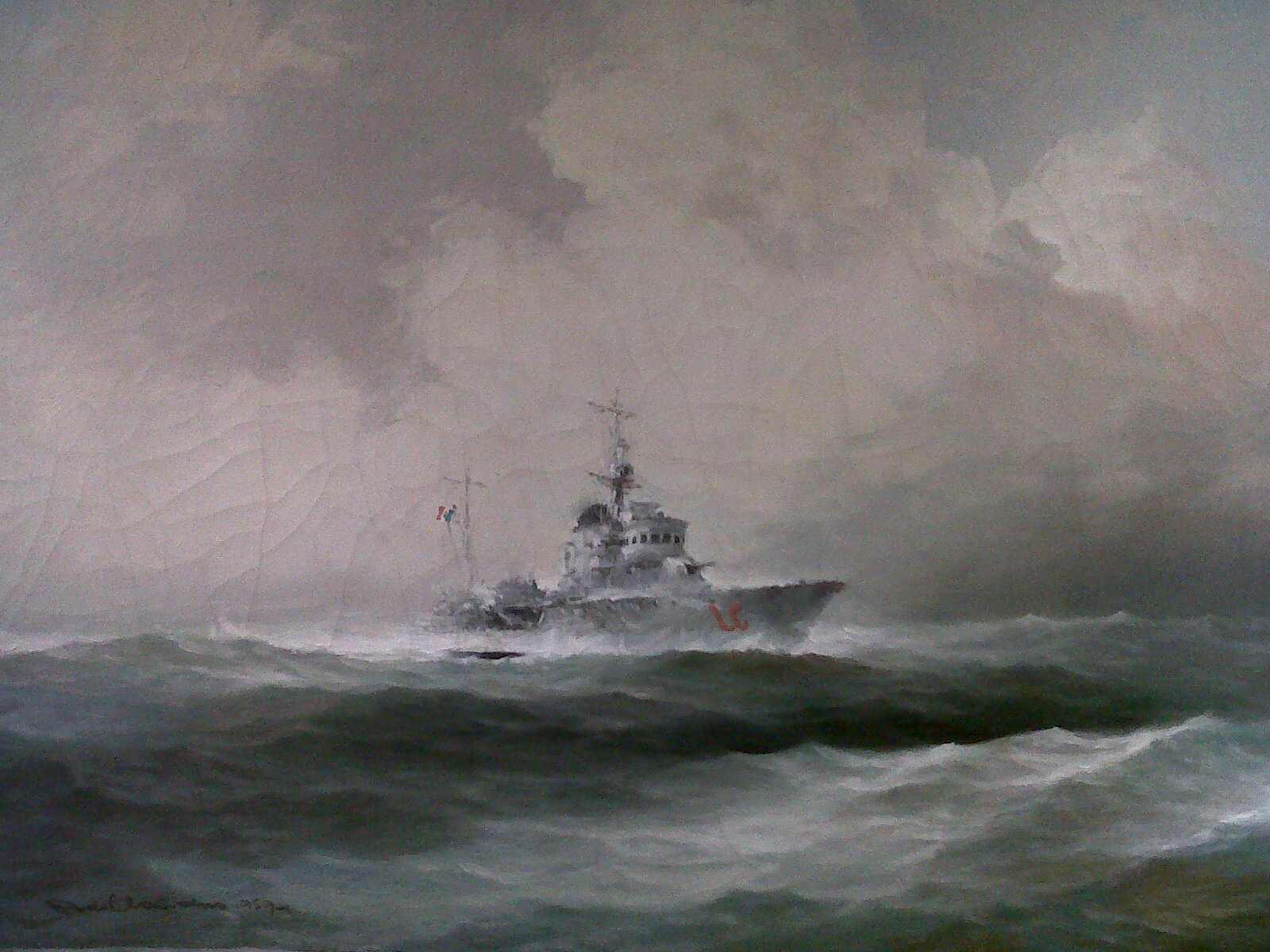
- Torpedo boat Lince

History

Italy
- Name: Lince
- Builder: CNQ, Fiume
- Laid down: 7 December 1936
- Launched: 15 January 1938
- Commissioned: 1 April 1938
- Identification: LC
- Fate: Sunk on 28 August 1943

General characteristics
- Class & type: Spica-class torpedo boat
- Displacement: 670 long tons (680 t) standard; 1,030 long tons (1,050 t) full load
- Length: 82 m (269 ft 0 in)
- Beam: 7.92 m (26 ft 0 in)
- Draught: 2.82 m (9 ft 3 in)
- Propulsion: 2 Yarrow boilers, 2 Tosi steam turbines, 2 shafts; 19,000 hp (14,200 kW)
- Speed: 34 knots (63 km/h; 39 mph)
- Complement: 110
- Armament: 3 × 100 mm (4 in)/47-caliber guns; 8 × 13.2 mm (0.52 in) anti-aircraft machine guns; 4 × 450 mm (18 in) torpedo tubes; 2 × DCTs; Up to 20 mines

The Italian torpedo boat Lince was a Spica-class torpedo boat built for the Regia Marina in the late 1930s. During the Second World War, Lince was involved in several naval actions before she was sunk in August 1943 by a British submarine.

== Construction and description ==
Lince was built in the late inter-war period by CNQ, Fiume, one of the Alcione sub-group of the numerous Spica-class torpedo boats. She was laid down on 7 December 1936, launched on 15 January 1938, and commissioned on 1 April 1938. Lince was armed with three 100-millimetre (3.9 in) guns in single mounts, and four 450 mm (18 in) torpedo tubes; she also had two depth charge throwers and equipment for laying mines.

The Spica-class ships all bore astronomical names; Lince was named for the constellation Lynx, after the big cat of that name.

== Service history ==
At the entrance of Italy into the Second World War Lince was stationed at Rhodes with the VIII Torpedo Boat Squadron, together with sister ships Lupo, Libra and Lira. There she was involved in escort duties and actions in the war against Greece.

In January 1941 Lince, in company with Lupo, conducted the Attack on Convoy AN 14, en route to Piraeus. Despite the escort of three destroyers Lince was able to distract them while Lupo torpedoed the tanker Desmoulea, which was disabled for the rest of the war. Italian official sources, reported that the ship that assisted Lupo in the attack was actually the torpedo boat Libra.

In February, Lince, again with Lupo, (and joined later by the destroyers Quintino Sella and Francesco Crispi) took part in the re-conquest of the island of Kastellorizo, that had been seized by British commandos in Operation Abstention. In April Lince, in company with Libra and Crispi, encountered the Allied Convoy GA 15 engaged in Operation Demon the evacuation of troops from Greece. Despite the strong escort Lince and her companions made a spirited attack, claiming several hits, though the Allied commander later reported no losses.

In February 1942 Lince went to the aid of the tanker Lucania, which had been torpedoed, and, with Circe, took part in an anti-submarine hunt which resulted in the sinking of the British submarine Tempest. In August Lince was assisting the freighter Iseo, which had been attacked by the British submarine Porpoise. Lince counter-attacked, resulting in damage to Porpoise which was forced to return to base. In November Lince was badly damaged in an air attack off Tripoli, suffering the loss of her commander and many of the crew. She was able to dock in Tripoli for repairs, but with the retreat of the Afrika Korps towards the city her master received orders in January 1943 to scuttle the ship to avoid a capture. Her crew endeavoured to bring her home, arriving at Trapani despite Allied attacks at the end of the month. In July Lince returned to escort duty, but was lost in August after she ran aground.

== Fate ==
On 4 August 1943, en route from Taranto, Lince ran aground at Punta Alice, near Ciro Marina, Calabria. Despite efforts to re-float her, Lince was discovered on 28 August by the British submarine Ultor, and hit with two torpedoes. The ship was destroyed, though casualties were light as her crew had been evacuated, leaving only damage control parties.
