= HSwMS Romulus =

WW2 Swedish Navy destroyer

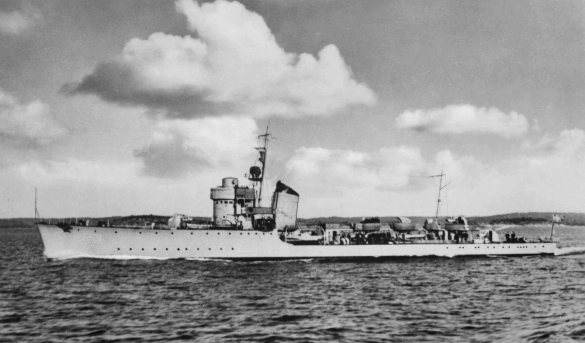

History

Italy
- Name: Spica
- Builder: BS Napoletani
- Launched: 11 March 1934
- Fate: Sold to Sweden, March 1940

Sweden
- Name: Romulus
- Acquired: 1940
- Decommissioned: 1958
- Fate: Sold for scrap, 1961

General characteristics
- Class & type: Romulus-class destroyer
- Displacement: 630 long tons (640 t) (standard)
- Length: 81.4 m (267 ft 1 in)
- Beam: 8.2 m (26 ft 11 in)
- Draft: 2.3 m (7 ft 7 in)
- Installed power: 2 Yarrow boilers; 19,000 shp (14,000 kW)
- Propulsion: 2 shafts; 2 geared steam turbines
- Speed: 34 knots (63 km/h; 39 mph)
- Range: 1,700 nmi (3,100 km; 2,000 mi) at 16 knots (30 km/h; 18 mph)
- Complement: 99
- Sensors & processing systems: Sonar and hydrophones
- Armament: 3 × single 100 mm (3.9 in) 100/47 DP guns; 3 × single 20 mm (0.8 in) AA guns; 2 × twin 457 mm (18 in) torpedo tubes (2 × twin mounts); 2 × depth charge throwers; 28 × mines

HSwMS Romulus (27) was the lead ship of her class of two destroyers that was purchased from the Royal Italian Navy in 1940 for the Royal Swedish Navy. She served during World War II and the first decades of the Cold War. The ship had been built as Spica during the 1930s.

== Design and description ==
The Romulus-class ships consisted of two Spica class purchased from the Royal Italian Navy in March 1940 that had been built in Italy as Spica and Astore. The ships displaced 630 long tons (640 t) at standard load and 900 long tons (910 t) at deep load. They measured 81.4 meters (267 ft 1 in) long overall with a beam of 8.2 meters (26 ft 11 in), and a draft of 2.3 meters (7 ft 7 in). The Romulus's were propelled by two Tosi geared steam turbines, each driving one propeller shaft using steam from a pair of Yarrow boilers. The turbines were designed to produce a total of 19,000 shaft horsepower (14,000 kW) for an intended maximum speed of 34 knots (63 km/h; 39 mph). The ships carried enough fuel oil to give them a range of 1,700 nautical miles (3,100 km; 2,000 mi) at 16 knots (30 km/h; 18 mph). The ships' crew numbered 99.

The main armament of the Romulus class consisted of three 100-millimeter (3.9 in) dual-purpose guns in single mounts. One gun was located at the forecastle and the others were in superfiring mounts at the stern. After modifications by the Royal Swedish Navy, their anti-aircraft defense was provided by three 20-millimeter (0.8 in) Breda AA guns in single mounts and a pair of 13.2-millimeter (0.5 in) M/31 heavy machine guns. The ships were equipped with four 533-millimeter (21 in) torpedo tubes in two rotating, twin-tube mounts located between the rear funnel and the stern gun. Two depth charge throwers were fitted and the ships could carry 28 mines.

== Construction and career ==
Spica was launched on 11 March 1934, the lead ship of her class of torpedo boats, and commissioned on 30 May 1935. In December 1939, a Swedish commission to Italy departed to investigate the possibility for Sweden to buy warships. This led to the acquisition of Spica and Astore and two Sella Class destroyers. On 14 April 1940, all four destroyers left La Spezia for Sweden. The journey was dramatic including the ships being impounded by United Kingdom on 20 June in the Faroe Islands, the Psilander affair. The British released her on 1 July and Romulus and entered service later that year after she were modified to suit Arctic conditions and with Swedish equipment. The ship was stricken from the navy list on 15 August 1958.
