= HSwMS Psilander =

Several ships of the Swedish Navy have been named HSwMS Psilander, named after admiral Gustaf von Psilander:

- HSwMS Psilander (1899) was a torpedo cruiser launched in 1899 and decommissioned in 1937 and sunk as target in 1939
- HSwMS Psilander (18) was a Psilander-class destroyer launched in 1926 and decommissioned in 1947
