= HSwMS Psilander (18) =

WW2 Swedish Navy destroyer

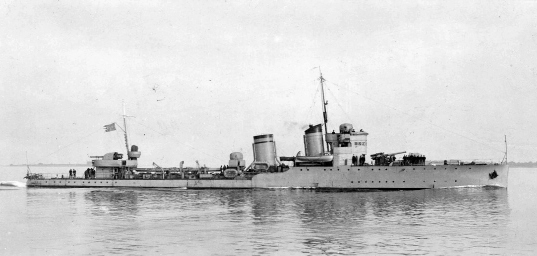

History

Italy
- Name: Giovanni Nicotera
- Namesake: Giovanni Nicotera
- Builder: Societa Pattison, Naples
- Launched: 24 June 1926
- Commissioned: 8 January 1927
- Fate: Sold to Sweden, 1940

Sweden
- Name: Psilander
- Namesake: Gustaf von Psilander
- Acquired: 1940
- Commissioned: 27 March 1940
- Decommissioned: 13 June 1947
- Fate: Scrapped, 1949

General characteristics (as built)
- Class & type: Psilander-class destroyer
- Displacement: 970 t (950 long tons) (standard); 1,480 t (1,460 long tons) (full load)
- Length: 84.9 m (278 ft 7 in)
- Beam: 8.6 m (28 ft 3 in)
- Draught: 2.7 m (8 ft 10 in)
- Installed power: 3 Thornycroft boilers; 36,000 shp (27,000 kW)
- Propulsion: 2 shafts; 2 geared steam turbines
- Speed: 33 knots (61 km/h; 38 mph)
- Range: 3,600 nmi (6,700 km; 4,100 mi) at 14 knots (26 km/h; 16 mph)
- Complement: 152–153
- Armament: 1 × twin, 1 × single 120 mm (4.7 in) guns; 2 × single 40 mm (1.6 in) AA guns; 2 × single 13.2 mm (0.52 in) machine guns; 2 × twin 533 mm (21 in) torpedo tubes; 32 mines

HSwMS Psilander (18) was a Psilander-class destroyer of the Swedish Navy from 1940 to 1947. The ship was purchased from Italy by Sweden in 1940, along with her sister ship HSwMS Puke. Before that, she served in the Regia Marina (Royal Italian Navy) as Giovanni Nicotera, one of four members of the Italian Sella class. Psilander was scrapped in 1949.

== Design and description ==
The Sella-class destroyers were enlarged and improved versions of the preceding Palestro and Curtatone classes. They had an overall length of 84.9 meters (279 ft), a beam of 8.6 meters (28 ft 3 in) and a mean draft of 2.7 meters (8 ft 10 in). They displaced 970 metric tons (950 long tons) at standard load, and 1,480 metric tons (1,460 long tons) at deep load. Their complement was 8–9 officers and 144 enlisted men.

The Sellas were powered by two Parsons geared steam turbines, each driving one propeller shaft using steam supplied by three Thornycroft boilers. The turbines were rated at 36,000 shaft horsepower (27,000 kW) for a speed of 33 knots (61 km/h; 38 mph) in service, although the ships reached speeds in excess of 37 knots (69 km/h; 43 mph) during their sea trials while lightly loaded. The ships carried enough fuel oil to give them a range of 1,800 nautical miles (3,300 km; 2,100 mi) at a speed of 14 knots (26 km/h; 16 mph).

Their main battery consisted of four 120-millimeter (4.7 in) guns in one twin-gun turret aft of the superstructure and one single-gun turret forward of it. Anti-aircraft (AA) defense for the Sella-class ships was provided by a pair of 40-millimeter (1.6 in) AA guns in single mounts amidships and a pair of 13.2-millimeter (0.52 in) machine guns. They were equipped with four 533-millimeter (21 in) torpedo tubes in two twin mounts amidships. The Sellas could also carry 32 mines.

== Construction and career ==
Giovanni Nicotera, named after the politician Giovanni Nicotera, was laid down by Pattinson at their Naples shipyard on 6 May 1925, launched on 24 June 1926 and commissioned on 8 January 1927. The forward single-gun turret was replaced by a twin-gun turret two years later.

=== Sale to Sweden ===
In December 1939, a Swedish commission to Italy departed to investigate the possibility for Sweden to buy warships. This led to the acquisition of the Psilander and Romulus classes. On 14 April 1940, all four destroyers left La Spezia and on 10 July the ships arrived in Gothenburg where the ship was named after Admiral Gustaf von Psilander. The journey was dramatic including the ships being captured by United Kingdom, the Psilander affair.

=== Swedish service ===
After arriving in Sweden, Psilander was put into service in the Gothenburg Squadron. Over time, the ship was found to be to weakly built and rolled heavily in heavy seas, which meant that reinforcements had to be made and bilge keel had to be mounted on the hull. In addition, the low freeboard of the stern caused it to be flooded in bad weather. In the years 1941-1942 the ships armament were modified. The air defense was changed to two 40 mm anti-aircraft automatic guns m/36 and two dual 8 mm anti-aircraft machine guns m/36. The 45 cm torpedoes was changed to 53 cm torpedoes and depth charge throwers and rack-deployed depth charges were installed. After a very short service, the ships were placed in reserve between 1943 and 1944.

=== Fate ===
Psilander was decommissioned on 13 June 1947, after which she used for shooting and exploding tests before she finally was scrapped in Karlskrona in 1949.
