= HMS Jaguar (F34) =

Destroyer of the Royal Navy

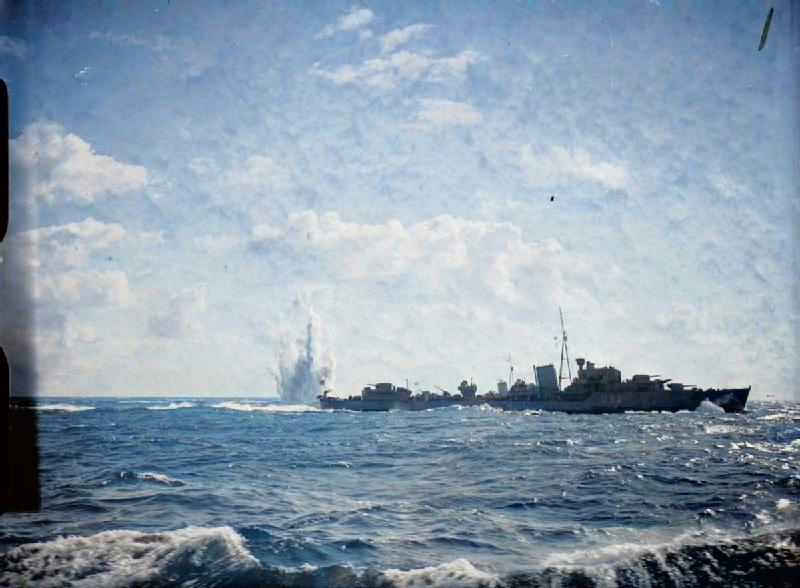
- Jaguar dropping depth charges, 1940.

History

United Kingdom
- Name: Jaguar
- Namesake: Jaguar
- Builder: William Denny and Brothers
- Laid down: 25 November 1937
- Launched: 22 November 1938
- Commissioned: 12 September 1939
- Identification: Pennant number: F34
- Fate: Sunk, 26 March 1942

General characteristics (as built)
- Class & type: J-class destroyer
- Displacement: 1,690 long tons (1,720 t) (standard); 2,330 long tons (2,370 t) (deep load)
- Length: 356 ft 6 in (108.66 m) o/a
- Beam: 35 ft 9 in (10.90 m)
- Draught: 12 ft 6 in (3.81 m) (deep)
- Installed power: 44,000 shp (33,000 kW); 2 × Admiralty 3-drum boilers
- Propulsion: 2 × shafts; 2 × geared steam turbines
- Speed: 36 knots (67 km/h; 41 mph)
- Range: 5,500 nmi (10,200 km; 6,300 mi) at 15 knots (28 km/h; 17 mph)
- Complement: 183 (218 for flotilla leaders)
- Sensors & processing systems: ASDIC
- Armament: 3 × twin 4.7 in (120 mm) guns; 1 × quadruple 2 pdr (40 mm (1.6 in) AA guns; 2 × quadruple 0.5 in (12.7 mm) anti-aircraft machineguns; 2 × quintuple 21 in (533 mm) torpedo tubes; 1 × rack, 2 × throwers for depth charges

HMS Jaguar was a J-class destroyer of the Royal Navy. Commissioned in September 1939, she was present at the Dunkirk evacuation the following year, during which Jaguar was damaged by dive bombers. She later served in the Mediterranean and was involved in several actions there. She was torpedoed off the coast of Egypt on 26 March 1942 and sunk.

== Construction ==
The eight ships of the J class were ordered on 25 March 1937, and Jaguar was laid down at the Dumbarton shipyard of Denny on 25 November 1937. She was launched on 22 November 1938 and commissioned on 12 September 1939.

Jaguar was 339 feet 6 inches (103.48 m) long between perpendiculars and 356 feet 6 inches (108.66 m) overall, with a beam of 35 feet 8 inches (10.87 m) and a draught of 9 feet (2.7 m). Displacement was 1,690 long tons (1,720 t) standard and 2,330 long tons (2,370 t) deep load. Two Admiralty three-drum boilers fed steam at 300 pounds per square inch (2,100 kPa) and 620 °F (327 °C) to Parsons to two sets of Parsons single-reduction geared-steam turbines, rated at 40,000 shaft horsepower (30,000 kW). This gave a design speed of 36 knots (67 km/h; 41 mph) at trials displacement and 32 knots (59 km/h; 37 mph) at full load.

As completed, Jaguar had a main gun armament of six 4.7 in (120 mm) QF Mark XII guns in three twin mountings, two forward and one aft. These guns could only elevate to an angle of 40 degrees, and so were of limited use in the anti-aircraft role, while the aft mount was arranged so that it could fire forwards over the ship's superstructure to maximise the forward firing firepower, but was therefore incapable of firing directly aft. A short range anti-aircraft armament of a four-barrelled 2-pounder "pom-pom" anti-aircraft mount and eight .50 in machine guns in two quadruple mounts was fitted, while torpedo armament consisted of ten 21-inch (533 mm) torpedo tubes in two quintuple mounts.

== Service ==
=== Home waters ===
On commissioning, Jaguar joined the 7th Destroyer Flotilla based at Grimsby, operating off Britain's east coast. On 11 October, the ship ran aground in the Firth of Forth and was under repair until November. She was refitted at the Caledon Shipbuilding & Engineering Company's Dundee yard from 15 March 1940 to 1 May that year, with leaks being rectified and her fuel tanks modified. On 20 May 1940, Jaguar, along with sister ships Jackal and Javelin and the corvette Puffin, escorted Naval trawlers as they cut the undersea telegraph cables between the UK and Borkum.

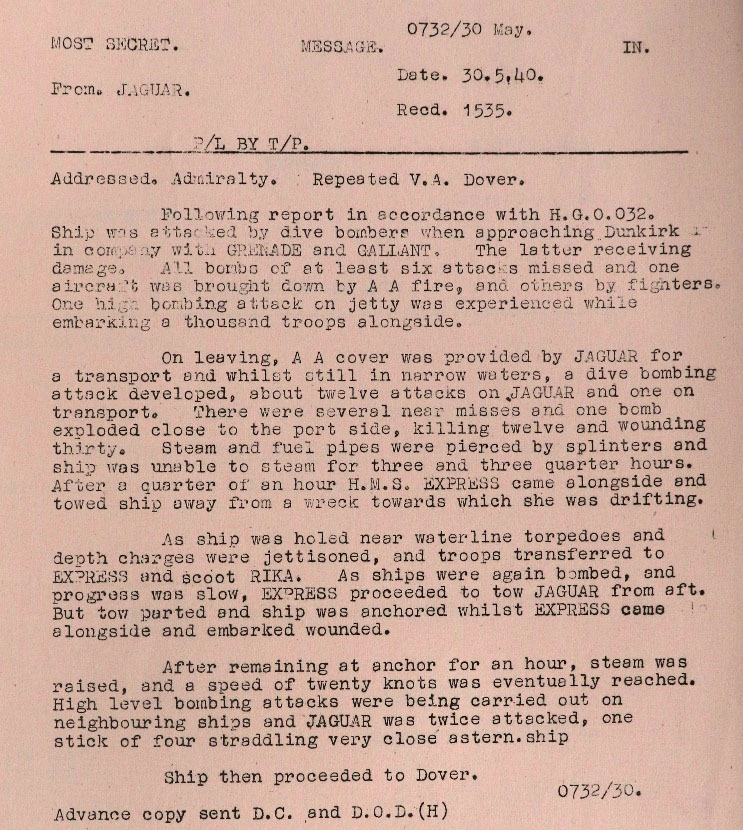
Report on HMS Jaguar's actions at Dunkirk.

On 26 May 1940, the Royal Navy set Operation Dynamo in motion, to rescue trapped British troops from Dunkirk and the surrounding area. On 27 May, Jaguar, together with Javelin and Grenade, was deployed to screen the evacuation operations from the North. On 28 May, Jaguar and other destroyers rescued survivors from the sinking of SS Abukir. Jaguar landed 370 troops picked up from the beaches of Bray-Dunes at Dover early on 29 May. Later that day she was ordered to embark troops from Dunkirk harbour. Jaguar, Grenade and Gallant were attacked by German dive bombers as they arrived at Dunkirk at about noon, with Gallant damaged by a near miss and forced to turn back.Jaguar and Grenade berthed side by side on the East Pier at Dunkirk. She embarked about 1000 troops before leaving the harbour at about 15:50 hr, when she was attacked by dive bombers and near missed by four bombs, which severed a steam pipe, which disabled her engines and knocking out her steering. She was towed clear of a wreck by the destroyer Express, which along with the coaster Rika, took off Jaguar's troops. Later that day, Jaguar managed to restore power and returned to Dover under her own steam.

Jaguar was sent to the Humber for repair, returning to service on 23 June. On 1 September, she, together with Javelin, Punjabi and Tartar, escorted the cruiser Fiji back to the Clyde after Fiji had been torpedoed west of the Hebrides. In October 1940 she was transferred to Portsmouth, and on 11 October, took part in Operation Medium, when the destroyers of the 5th Destroyer Flotilla, including Jaguar, escorted the battleship Revenge during a bombardment of Cherbourg harbour. From 14 October to 1 November, Jaguar was refitted at Devonport, being fitted with degaussing coils.

=== The Mediterranean ===
On 23 November 1940, Jaguar joined Force H based at Gibraltar. On 27 November, she took part in the Battle of Cape Spartivento. In January 1941, the British carried out Operation Excess, an operation to run a convoy from Gibraltar to Malta and Piraus in Greece, while simultaneously running another convoy from Alexandria to Malta. Jaguar formed part of the close escort of the convoy running eastwards from Gibraltar. At dawn on 10 January, the Italian torpedo boats Circe and Vega attacked the convoy, launching seven torpedoes, all of which missed. Gunfire from the cruiser Bonaventure and the destroyers of the escort soon disabled Vega, and Jaguar closed to within 300 yd (270 m) of Vega and raked her with gunfire, setting the torpedo boat ablaze before the destroyer Hereward sank Vega with a torpedo. Jaguar fired 88 4.7 inch rounds and six 4-inch rounds during the engagement. When the operation was complete Jaguar joined the 14th Destroyer Flotilla of the Mediterranean Fleet. In later February 1941 she took part in Operation Abstention, an attempt to capture the island of Kastelorizo in the Dodecanese from the Italians. The Italians rushed reinforcements to the island, forcing the British force to evacuate. Jaguar was covering the evacuation when she encountered the Italian destroyer Francesco Crispi in the early hours of 27 February. After a brief exchange of fire between the two ships, Jaguar's searchlight was hit by a 40 mm (1.6 in) round from Crispi, causing contact to be lost. That March she was at sea as part of Force D during the Battle of Cape Matapan.

On the night of 20/21 April 1941, Jaguar formed part of the escort for the battleships Warspite, Valiant and Barham and the cruiser Gloucester when they bombarded the port of Tripoli in Libya. On 23 April, Jaguar together with sister ships Janus, Jervis and Juno set out from Malta to intercept an Italian convoy on the way from Italy to Tripoli. The four destroyers engaged and sunk the Italian armed motor ship Egeo south of Lampedusa, but the convoy avoided the searching British ships. Jaguar took part in the Battle of Crete, delivering ammunition to British troops fighting on the island and escorting ships carrying out the evacuation from Crete. Jaguar was near missed by a bomb on 30 May. In June 1941, Britain launched an invasion of Vichy French Syria and Lebanon, and on 23 June, Jaguar, together with the cruisers Leander, Naiad and the destroyers Kingston and Nizam, clashed with the French destroyer Guépard, which was hit once but managed to escape.

After the end of the Syrian campaign, Jaguar operated out of Alexandria, duties including escorting supply convoys to besieged Tobruk, and shore bombardment duties off the coast of Libya. On 1 December 1941, her bridge was hit by a single 4.7 in shell accidentally fired by Jervis while the latter destroyer guns were being cleaned. Two men were killed, including Jaguar's commanding officer Lieut.-Comdr. John F.W. Hine. Later that month, Jaguar was deployed to Malta for operations against Italian convoys carrying supplies to North Africa. On the night of 18/19 December, three cruisers and four destroyers of Force K set out from Malta to intercept an Italian convoy, but ran into a minefield north of Tripoli, with the cruiser Neptune striking four mines and sinking, the cruisers Aurora and Penelope also striking mines. The destroyer Kandahar struck a mine when trying to rescue survivors from Neptune, blowing her stern off. Early on 20 December, Jaguar found Kandahar, but the seas were too heavy for Jaguar to take Kandahar under tow, so after picking up 165 (Note: 175 according to Kemp) survivors from the stricken destroyer's crew, Jaguar scuttled Kandahar with torpedoes.

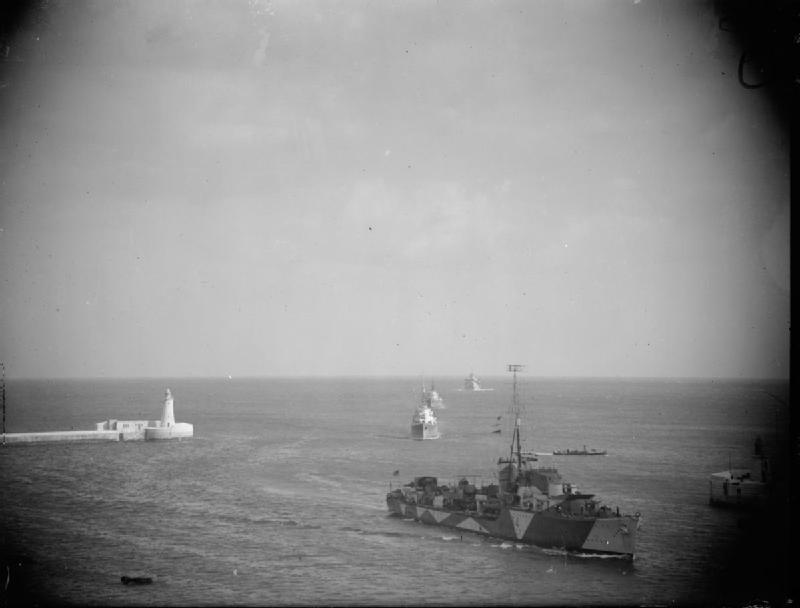
Jaguar entering the Grand Harbour in Valetta, Malta, in wartime dazzle camouflage.

Jaguar helped to escort convoy MF 2 into Malta on 7–8 January 1942. She left Malta later that month, and from 13 to 16 June escorted the Malta-bound three ship Convoy MW 9, but two of the merchant ships were sunk and the third damaged and forced to put into Tobruk. On 26 March 1942 Jaguar and the Greek destroyer Vasilissa Olga were escorting the tanker RFA Slavol when Slavol was torpedoed by the German submarine U-652 and set on fire. Jaguar came alongside Salvol to rescue the oiler's crew, but the destroyer was then struck by two more torpedoes from U-652. Jaguar broke into three parts and quickly sank off Sidi Barrani, Egypt, 31°53′N 26°18′E with the loss of 3 officers and 190 of her crew, including two from the Irish Republic which was neutral at the time. (Note: Petty Officer Richard Wafer of Guileen, County Cork, and Able Seaman Albert Edward Stevens of Bray, County Wicklow.) 8 officers and 45 crewmen were rescued by the South African naval whaler Klo.
