= Franco Garofalo =

Franco Garofalo may refer to:

- Franco Garofalo (admiral)
- Franco Garofalo (actor)
