= Abstention (disambiguation) =

Abstention is refusing to vote in an election or in a parliamentary vote.

Abstention may also refer to:

- Abstentionism, standing for election to an assembly while boycotting the assembly itself
- Abstention doctrine, applied by a court refusing to hear a case which ought to be heard by a different court
- Operation Abstention, code name of the British invasion of the Italian island of Kastelorizo, off Turkey, during World War II, in February 1941
- Abstinence, voluntary restraint from a bodily pleasure, such as alcohol or sexual intercourse
