= Operation Abstention =

1941 British operation in World War II

- Part of the Battle of the Mediterranean of the Second World War
- Italian destroyer Francesco Crispi
Date	25–28 February 1941
Location	Island of Kastelorizo, eastern Aegean Sea 36°09′00″N 29°35′24″E
Result	Italian victory

Belligerents
United Kingdom; Australia	Italy

Commanders and leaders
Andrew Cunningham; Edward Renouf; Henry Egerton	Luigi Biancheri; Francesco Mimbelli

Strength
2 light cruisers; 7 destroyers; 1 gunboat; 1 submarine; 1 armed yacht; 200 Commandos; 200 soldiers and marines	2 destroyers; 2 torpedo boats; 2 MAS boats; SM.79 bombers; SM.81 bombers; 280 soldiers; 88 marines

Casualties and losses
3–5 killed; 10–11 wounded; 20 captured/interned; 7 missing; 1 destroyer damaged; 1 gunboat damaged	14 killed; 43 wounded; 12 captured
- The island of Kastellorizo

Operation Abstention (25–28 February 1941) was the code name of a British invasion of the Italian island of Kastelorizo (Castellorizo) off the Turkish Aegean coast, during the Second World War. The British wanted to establish a motor torpedo-boat base to challenge Italian naval supremacy on the Dodecanese islands. The British landings were opposed swiftly by Italian land, air and naval forces, that forced the British troops to re-embark amidst some confusion and led to recriminations between the British commanders for underestimating the Italians.

Admiral Andrew Cunningham, the commander of the Mediterranean Fleet, described the operation as "a rotten business and reflected little credit to everyone" and laid blame on Rear-Admiral Edward Renouf. A Board of Inquiry found that the captain of Hereward was wrong to join Decoy, instead of engaging the Italian force without delay and that this caused the isolation of the Commandos and the failure of the main landing.

== Background ==
After the attack on Taranto and the success of Operation Compass, an offensive in Cyrenaica, Libya from December 1940 – February 1941, the British conducted operations to neutralise Italian forces in the Dodecanese islands. Admiral Andrew Cunningham, the commander of the Mediterranean Fleet planned to occupy Kastelorizo, the easternmost Greek island in the chain just off the Turkish coast, about 80 nmi (150 km; 92 mi) from Rhodes to establish a motor torpedo boat base at a time when Axis air attacks on Malta had led to the last flying boat being withdrawn to Alexandria.

The Italian garrison on Kastellorizo consisted two detachments of 15 soldiers each with ten gendarmes and Guardia di Finanza, equipped with five machine-guns, two at the wireless station, two at an observation post on Monte Viglia and the fifth with the gendarmes. The operation was intended as a first step towards the control of the Aegean Sea. Despite isolation, Italian naval and air forces in the area were still capable of carrying out hit-and-run attacks on Allied shipping between Egypt and Greece.

=== Plan ===
The British planned to land a force of about 200 men of No. 50 Commando, assisted by a 24-man detachment of Royal Marines to establish a beachhead on the island, to be followed 24 hours later by an army unit to consolidate the British position, 67 of whom were to be from the Spanish emigré fighters who had been involved in the defence of Crete. At the last minute they were removed from the operation, in fear that Spanish-speakers might be mistaken for Italians. The 1st Battalion the Sherwood Foresters had been garrisoning Cyprus since June 1940 and B Company had been told to get ready for clandestine operations in February 1941 but not told any details. On 22 February some information was passed on to Major Cooper but not the place and he was not given maps, only a sealed envelope to be opened when the troops sailed. Cooper had no time to plan or discuss details with other participants.

== Battle ==
=== 24/25 February ===
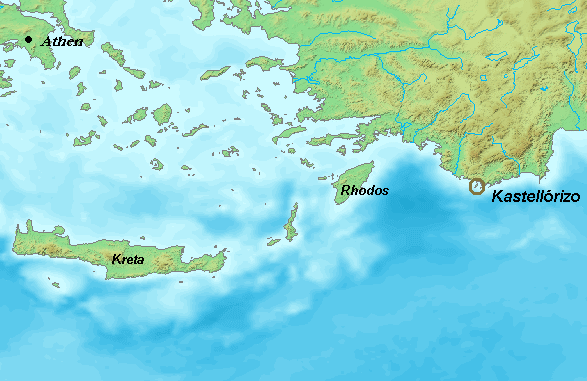
Map of the South-eastern Aegean Sea

On 24 February 200 Commandos, transported by the destroyers HMS Decoy and Hereward and the marines on the gunboat HMS Ladybird, sailed from Suda Bay, escorted by HMS Gloucester with Rear-Admiral Edward de Faye Renouf, the commander of the 3rd Cruiser Squadron leading the expedition. The ships sailed westwards through the Kythira Strait, then south of Crete and met a navigational beacon, the submarine HMS Parthian, 4 nmi (7.4 km; 4.6 mi) to the south-west of Kastellorizo at 2:00 a.m. on 25 February. The second force, B Company, 1st Battalion, the Sherwood Foresters was embarked on HMS Rosaura, an armed yacht, late on 24 February. Rosaura departed Famagusta at 4:20 a.m. on 25 February, escorted by the light cruisers HMAS Perth and Bonaventure with the destroyers Decoy and Hereward.

Before dawn, fifty of the Commandos landed unopposed from ten whalers on Nifti Point, south of the settlement, while the Royal Marines occupied the harbour. The landings were helped by the submarine Parthian, that had made a reconnaissance of the landing points. The garrison was in charge of a post on Monte Viglia and a wireless station, that was quickly taken, although not before a warning had been transmitted; the barracks and the residence of the commandant was also occupied. The Commandos ambushed an Italian patrol on the track between Nifti Point and the port, killing two soldiers and wounding one. The British had surprised the garrison, seized the wireless station and inflicted 13 casualties, including twelve prisoners; the rest of the Commandos landed during the action.

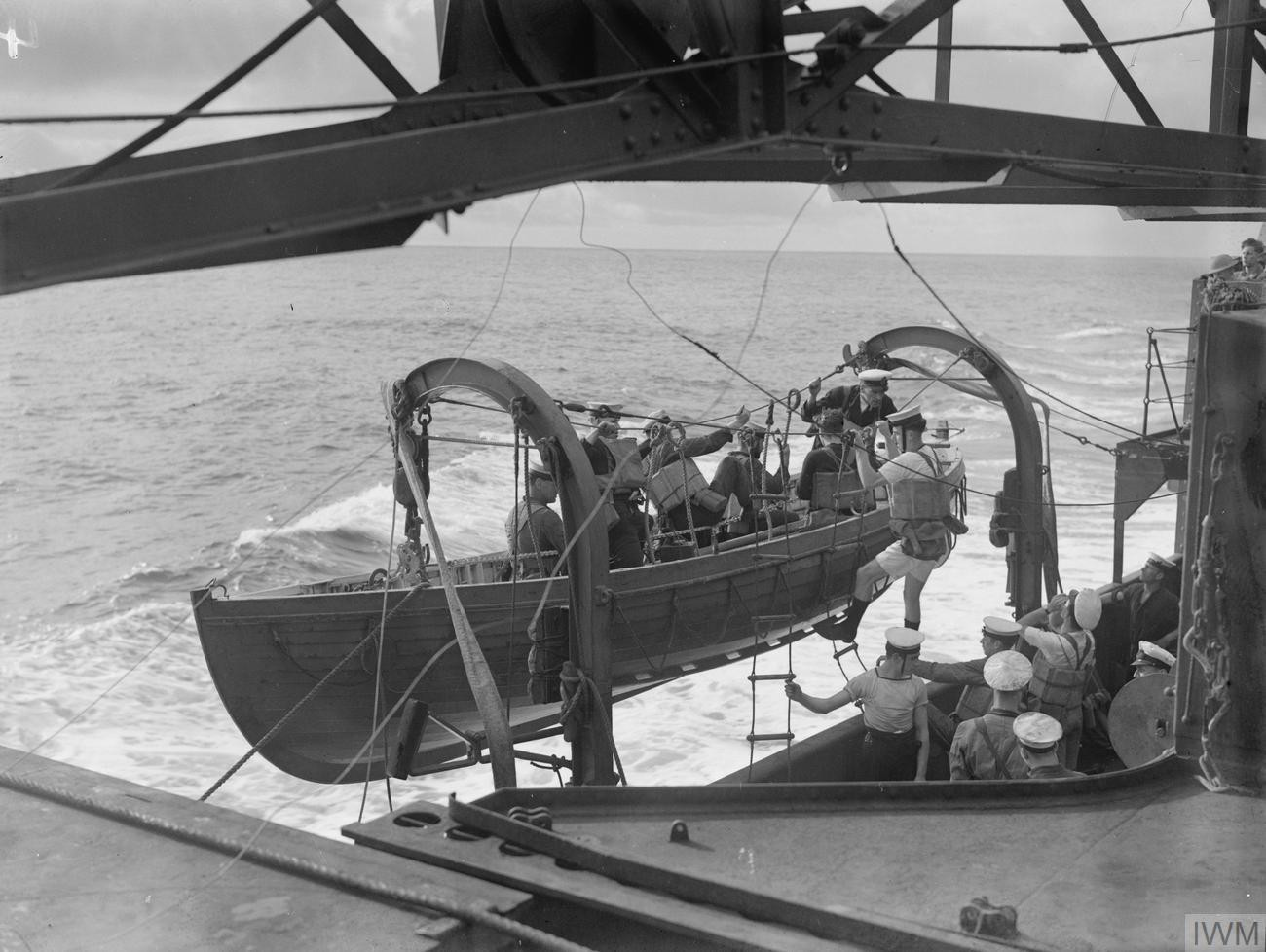
Example of a whaler being launched (October 1941)

The Commandos decided to wait for the 24 Royal Marines embarked in the gunboat Ladybird before attacking the observation point with the support of its two 6-inch guns. The gunboat had departed Port Said on 22 February and arrived at Famagusta the next day, to embark the Sherwood Foresters on the armed boarding vessel Rosaura and to fuel Ladybird but it had to wait in Alexandria for the army to deliver canned water for the garrison and had no time at Famagusta to fuel. Ladybird reached the port at Kastellorizo early in the morning and received small-arms fire from the shore. The pom-pom guns on Ladybird swiftly silenced the resistance and twelve rounds of 6-inch fired at the post on Monte Viglia led to its swift capture by the Commandos, after which the Marines were landed.

==== Italian counter-attack ====
Before being overrun, the Italian distress call to Rhodes, the main Italian air and naval base in the Dodecanese had been received. Ammiraglio di Divisione (Vice Admiral) Luigi Biancheri, commander of the Italian naval forces in the Aegean Sea reacted swiftly. From 08:00 and 09:30, aircraft of the Regia Aeronautica (Italian Royal Air Force) raided the harbour castle and the main hills of the island, where the Commandos were dug in. Ladybird was struck by a bomb and three sailors were wounded. Short of fuel, Ladybird re-embarked the Royal Marines after being told that the were not needed and made for Famagusta to get the wounded to hospital, depriving the Commandos of a wireless link with Alexandria.

Location of Kastelorizo

The Italian destroyers Francesco Crispi and Quintino Sella with the torpedo boats Lince and Lupo departed Rhodes with reinforcements of sixteen troops, a naval party of 36 men to recover the wireless station and the lookout post and fifty Blackshirts of the 13th Blackshirt Company and 65 sailors drawn from the ships for the landing. Bad weather hampered the Italian effort as it had the British. On the night of 26/27 February, Lince, Lupo ant the motor torpedo boats MAS 546 and MAS 561 landed the reinforcements north of the port and used their 3.9 in (99 mm) guns to bombard British positions at the docks and the Governor's palace, killing three Commandos and wounding seven, then evacuated a number of Italian civilians who had gathered at harbour.

As the Italians counter-attacked, the Commandos retreated to their encampment at the landing beach near Nifti Point, under fire from Lupo. After landing its wounded at Cyprus, Ladybird had loaded 20 long tons (20 t) of fuel and left for Haifa for repairs. At 5:30 p.m. Hereward sailed ahead of the Rosaura flotilla to let the Commandos know that the Sherwood Foresters would be landing during the night to avoid the aircraft of the Regia Aeronautica. Hereward arrived off Nifti Point at 11:00 p.m. to put navigation lights on the point and prepare boats to disembark the garrison force but had a signal that Italian ships were nearby and two to the north, thought to be landing reinforcements. Hereward transmitted a report but this was taken to mean that Italian ships had been spotted and Renouf ordered Hereward to attack but it failed to find any ships and turned south to join Decoy.

=== 25−26 February ===
The captain of Hereward was warned by the Commandos at Nifti Point and joined Decoy, about 40 nmi (74 km; 46 mi) off the coast. The commander ordered the ships to disrupt the Italian landings but the destroyers failed to find the Italian ships. Hereward reported that the Italian surface action threatened the landing of the main British force embarked on Rosaura, that had already been compromised by the air attacks on the harbour. Renouf, supposedly in command of the landing had been out of touch after Ladybird left Kastellorizo. Renouf ordered the ships to return and Admiral Andrew Cunningham, the commander of the Mediterranean Fleet at Alexandria was unaware of whether any of the ships had been left off Kastellorizo. The Australian cruiser Perth was ordered out of Alexandria on the morning of 26 February but the order was countermanded after Renouf signalled that he was sending his deputy by air to report to Cunningham. The staff officer arrived at 3:30 p.m. on 26 February and Cunningham discovered that no ships had been left near the island.

=== 26−27 February ===
The force with the garrison troops arrived at Alexandria overnight ant the troops were taken off Rosaura and in seventy minutes two platoons with cooper had been embarked in Decoy, followed within the hour by the rest with Captain W. H. A. Beck in Hero, accompanied by the cruisers Bonaventure and Perth with the destroyers Hasty and Jaguar, commanded by Captain H. J. Egerton of Bonaventure as Renouf had been admitted to hospital. The ships raced towards Kastellorizo and it was planned to land the troops in five whalers, four sailors transporting ten troops each time. The ships arrived at 11:00 p.m. with a fairly high wind, cold with occasional rain and no moon to illuminate the landing. The boats were lowered 800 yd (730 m) off the bay and mooring the boats was difficult in the disturbed sea conditions. The Commandos were not there and there was no gunfire to indicate their positions. One platoon established a bridgehead and the rest unloaded the whalers as Cooper, he orderly and a navy signaller went looking for the Commandos and soon found a position with clothes and ammunition.

Soon afterwards Cooper and his party found the body of a British soldier and then two soldiers in a state of disarray, who said that they were going to swim for Turkey as the rest of the Commando force had been destroyed. Cooper pressed on and found an NCO who reported that the Italians had recaptured the island. Cooper turned back and at the bay sent two search parties to look for survivors and then reported to Decoy to find that Colonel Symonds the Commando leader and nine others were aboard; Cooper went back to confer. During the landing, Bonaventure and Perth sailed to the north of the island to search for Italian ships with the destroyers covering the landing. Cooper decided to bring as many stores as possible to the island and attack the port at dawn, with covering fire from the ships but these were under orders to be away by 4:30 a.m. to evade air attacks. Without naval support, Cooper judged that another attack was impossible and ordered his troops to withdraw. The bulk of the landing party, isolated on a small plateau in the east end of Kastelorizo, was re-embarked by 3:00 a.m.

=== 28 February ===
Satellite photograph of Kastellorizo

Italian troops surrounded and captured Commandos who had been left behind. Francesco Crispi, Lince and Lupo scouted to the south for about 30 nmi (56 km; 35 mi) until 3:30 a.m. Quintino Sella reconnoitred between Rhodes and Cos as MAS-546 and MAS-561 patrolled off the harbour entrances on Kastellorizo and the submarine Galatea cruised 20 nmi (37 km; 23 mi) to the south-east of the island. While covering the withdrawal, HMS Jaguar was attacked by Crispi, that had fired twenty shells on British positions at Nifti Point, steaming from the south. Crispi fired two torpedoes which missed and Jaguar replied with her 4.7 in (120 mm) main armament. Jaguar received a 40 mm hit on her searchlight that made its gunfire ineffective until it could fire star shell but by then, Crispi had gone.

The British force was south of Kastellorizo by 3:00 a.m. and was back in Suda Bay at Crete by the afternoon. The commandos and their prisoners disembarked and the Foresters went ashore for hot food, sailing again a couple of hours later, in Decoy and Hereward, with Perth as an escort. (Note: Cooper was washed overboard but a rating saw him, threw a rope and got help to pull him aboard after fifteen minutes in the water.) The destroyers HMS Nubian, Hasty and Jaguar made a sweep between Rhodes and Kastellorizo after a radar contact and detecting wireless traffic in the area but failed to intercept the Italian warships as they returned to base.

== Aftermath ==
=== Analysis ===
Damage to the Governor's palace after the Italian reconquest

The ships reached Alexandria on 2 March and the Foresters were returned to Cyprus on the evening of 6 March. Cunningham described the operation as "a rotten business and reflected little credit to everyone" and laid blame on Renouf. A Board of Inquiry found that Hereward's commander made a misjudgement by rejoining Decoy, instead of engaging the Italian force without delay, that caused the failure of the main landing and the isolation of the Commandos. British commanders had also been surprised by the Italian riposte, especially the frequent air attacks which were unopposed. Greene and Massignani, writing in 1998, noted the British capture of Y-I, an Italian cipher book.

In 2008, Smith and Walker wrote that the operation had been bungled at the top from the start and much needed to be learned about amphibious operations; although a small defeat, the British had much to learn. In 2009, Vincent O'Hara wrote that the operation showed that the Italians dominated the seas around even their outlying bases and that this was not to be the last time that the British underestimated them. The Italians retained control of the Dodecanese Islands until the armistice of September 1943. When Italy changed sides, British forces landed on the islands to support the Italian garrisons in the Dodecanese Campaign (8 September – 22 November 1943). British and Italian troops were attacked and defeated by a German operation and the islands came under German control until the end of the war.

=== Casualties ===
In 1998, Greene and Massignani wrote that the British suffered three men killed, eleven wounded and 27 missing for an Italian loss of eight men killed, eleven wounded and ten missing. Smith and Walker (in 2008) recorded four British troops killed, eleven wounded and forty missing and Italian losses of fourteen killed, 43 wounded and twelve men taken prisoner.

== Orders of battle ==
=== Regia Marina ===
Ships
Ship	Flag	Type	Notes
Francesco Crispi	Kingdom of Italy	Sella-class destroyer	
Quintino Sella	Kingdom of Italy	Sella-class destroyer	
Lince	Kingdom of Italy	Spica-class torpedo boat	
Lupo	Kingdom of Italy	Spica-class torpedo boat	
Galatea	Kingdom of Italy	Sirena-class submarine	
MAS-541	Kingdom of Italy	Motoscafo armato silurante	Motor torpedo boat (MAS)
MAS-546	Kingdom of Italy	Motoscafo armato silurante	Motor torpedo boat (MAS)

Garrison
Type	No.	Notes
Signallers	30	
Carabinieri	10	Includes Guardia di Finanza

=== Royal Navy ===
Ship	Flag	Type	Notes
Suda Force
HMS Gloucester	Royal Navy	Town-class cruiser	Flag
HMS Decoy	Royal Navy	D-class destroyer	
HMS Hereward	Royal Navy	H-class destroyer	
HMS Parthian	Royal Navy	Parthian-class submarine	
Cyprus Force
HMS Rosaura	Royal Navy	Armed boarding vessel	
HMS Ladybird	Royal Navy	Insect-class gunboat	
Alexandria Force
HMS Bonaventure	Royal Navy	Dido-class cruiser	3rd Cruiser Squadron
HMAS Perth	Royal Navy	Leander-class cruiser	3rd Cruiser Squadron
HMS Decoy	Royal Navy	D-class destroyer	
HMS Hasty	Royal Navy	H-class destroyer	
HMS Hero	Royal Navy	H-class destroyer	
HMS Jaguar	Royal Navy	J-class destroyer	

=== Land forces ===
Army and Marine contingents
Unit	Flag	Type	Notes
Invasion force
No. 50 Commando	British Army	Infantry	200
Royal Marines	Royal Navy	Naval infantry	24
Garrison force
1st Sherwood Foresters	British Army	Infantry	B Company c. 150 men

== See also ==
- Convention between Italy and Turkey, 1932
- Balkans Campaign
- Dodecanese Campaign
- Operation Mandibles
