= HMS Mashona =

British Tribal-class destroyer

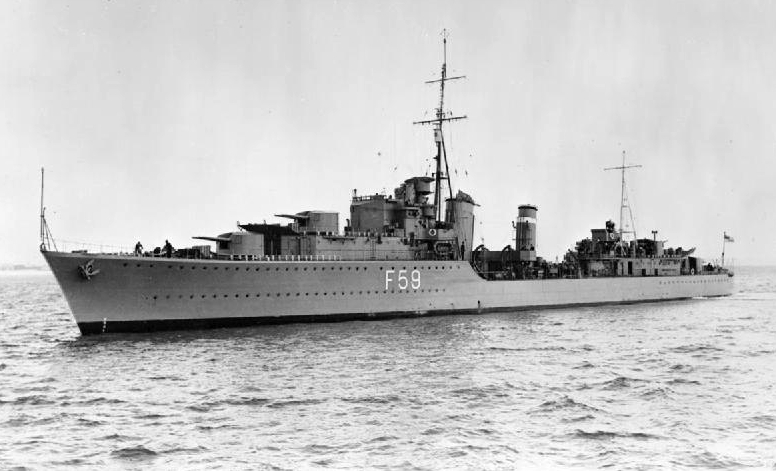
- Mashona, 27 April 1939

History

United Kingdom
- Name: Mashona
- Namesake: Shona people
- Ordered: 19 June 1936
- Builder: Vickers Armstrongs
- Cost: £341,108
- Laid down: 5 August 1936
- Launched: 3 September 1937
- Completed: 30 March 1939
- Identification: Pennant numbers: L59, later F59
- Fate: Sunk by aircraft, 28 May 1941

General characteristics (as built)
- Class & type: Tribal-class destroyer
- Displacement: 1,891 long tons (1,921 t) (standard); 2,519 long tons (2,559 t) (deep load)
- Length: 377 ft (114.9 m) (o/a)
- Beam: 36 ft 6 in (11.13 m)
- Draught: 11 ft 3 in (3.43 m)
- Installed power: 3 × Admiralty 3-drum boilers; 44,000 shp (33,000 kW)
- Propulsion: 2 × shafts; 2 × geared steam turbines
- Speed: 36 knots (67 km/h; 41 mph)
- Range: 5,700 nmi (10,600 km; 6,600 mi) at 15 knots (28 km/h; 17 mph)
- Complement: 190
- Sensors & processing systems: ASDIC
- Armament: 4 × twin 4.7 in (120 mm) guns; 1 × quadruple 2-pdr (40 mm (1.6 in)) AA guns; 2 × quadruple 0.5 in (12.7 mm) anti-aircraft machineguns; 1 × quadruple 21 in (533 mm) torpedo tubes; 20 × depth charges, 1 × rack, 2 × throwers

HMS Mashona was one of 16 Tribal-class destroyers built for the Royal Navy shortly before the beginning of Second World War in 1939. Completed in that year, she was assigned to the Home Fleet. During the first year of the war, the ship was on convoy escort duties. Mashona played an active role in the Norwegian Campaign of April–May 1940, escorting convoys to and from Norway. The ship helped to briefly seize four Swedish warships en route from Italy to Sweden in June 1940 in what became known as the Psilander affair and resumed her role of convoy escort after their release in July. She accidentally collided with one of her sister ships in early 1941 and spent several months under repair.

Mashona was escorting the battleship HMS Rodney in May when they were diverted to search for the German battleship Bismarck. The destroyer was forced to abandon the search for a lack of fuel shortly before the German ship was sunk on 27 May 1941. As Mashona was headed home, she was attacked and sunk by Luftwaffe bombers the following day, although nearby ships were able to rescue 184 of her crew.

== Description ==
The Tribal-class destroyers were intended to counter the large destroyers being built abroad and to improve the firepower of the existing destroyer flotillas and were thus significantly larger and more heavily armed than the preceding I class. The ships displaced 1,891 long tons (1,921 t) at standard load and 2,519 long tons (2,559 t) at deep load. They had an overall length of 377 feet (114.9 m), a beam of 36 feet 6 inches (11.13 m) and a draught of 11 feet 3 inches (3.43 m). The destroyers were powered by two Parsons geared steam turbines, each driving one propeller shaft using steam provided by three Admiralty three-drum boilers. The turbines developed a total of 44,000 shaft horsepower (33,000 kW) and gave a maximum speed of 36 knots (67 km/h; 41 mph). During her sea trials Mashona made 35.3 knots (65.4 km/h; 40.6 mph) from 45,437 shp (33,882 kW) at a displacement of 1,990 long tons (2,020 t). The ships carried enough fuel oil to give them a range of 5,700 nautical miles (10,600 km; 6,600 mi) at 15 knots (28 km/h; 17 mph). The ships' complement consisted of 190 officers and ratings, although the flotilla leaders carried an extra 20 officers and men consisting of the Captain (D) and his staff.

The primary armament of the Tribal-class was eight quick-firing (QF) 4.7-inch (120 mm) Mark XII guns in four twin-gun mounts, one pair each fore and aft of the superstructure, designated 'A', 'B', 'X', and 'Y' from front to rear. The mounts had a maximum elevation of 40°. For anti-aircraft (AA) defence, they carried a single quadruple mount for the 40-millimetre (1.6 in) QF two-pounder Mk II "pom-pom" gun and two quadruple mounts for the 0.5-inch (12.7 mm) Mark III machine gun. Low-angle fire for the main guns was controlled by the director-control tower (DCT) on the bridge roof that fed data acquired by it and the 12-foot (3.7 m) rangefinder on the Mk II Rangefinder/Director directly aft of the DCT to an analogue mechanical computer, the Mk I Admiralty Fire Control Clock. Anti-aircraft fire for the main guns was controlled by the Rangefinder/Director which sent data to the mechanical Fuze Keeping Clock.

The ships were fitted with a single above-water quadruple mount for 21-inch (533 mm) torpedoes. The Tribals were not intended as anti-submarine ships, but they were provided with ASDIC, one depth charge rack and two throwers for self-defence, although the throwers were not mounted in all ships; Twenty depth charges was the peacetime allotment, but this increased to 30 during wartime.

=== Wartime modifications ===
Heavy losses to German air attack during the Norwegian Campaign demonstrated the ineffectiveness of the Tribals' anti-aircraft suite and the RN decided in May 1940 to replace 'X' mount with a twin-gun mount for QF 4-inch (102 mm) Mark XVI dual-purpose guns; Mashona had hers fitted during her August–October 1940 refit. The ship may have been fitted with a Type 285 gunnery radar on the roof of the rangefinder/director. To increase the firing arcs of the AA guns, the rear funnel was shortened and the mainmast was reduced to a short pole mast. The number of depth charges was increased to 46 early in the war.

== Construction and career ==
Authorized as one of nine Tribal-class destroyers under the 1936 Naval Estimates, Mashona has been the only ship of her name to serve in the Royal Navy. The ship was ordered on 19 June 1936 from Parsons, but her hull was subcontracted to Vickers-Armstrongs and was laid down on 5 August at the company's High Walker, Newcastle upon Tyne, shipyard. Launched on 3 September 1937, Mashona was completed on 30 March 1939 and commissioned on 1 April at a cost of £341,108 which excluded weapons and communications outfits furnished by the Admiralty. Her construction had been delayed by the late delivery of her gun mountings. Initially assigned to the Sixth Destroyer Flotilla (DF) of the Home Fleet, under the command of Commander Patrick McLaughlin, the ship escorted the ocean liner Empress of Australia through the English Channel in May with King George VI and Queen Elizabeth aboard as they departed for their tour of Canada. The following month she helped to search for the sunken submarine Thetis after a diving accident.

When Great Britain declared war on Nazi Germany on 3 September 1939, Mashona and the bulk of the Home Fleet were unsuccessfully patrolling the waters between Iceland, Norway and Scotland for German blockade runners. The 2nd Cruiser Squadron, including Mashona, was already at sea when the submarine Spearfish, on patrol in the Heligoland Bight, was badly damaged by German depth charges on 24 September. Unable to submerge, she requested assistance and the squadron responded with two destroyers escorting her home. The rest of the squadron, backed by the bulk of the Home Fleet, provided cover. The Germans spotted the squadron and unsuccessfully attacked the ships with nine bombers from the first group of Bomber Wing 26 (I/Kampfgeschwader 26). Mashona was present in Scapa Flow when the German submarine U-47 sank the battleship Royal Oak on the night of 13/14 October. By the time the British realised that the battleship had been torpedoed and Mashona became the first ship to search for the submarine, some two hours had passed and U-47 had reached the open sea.

The destroyer was refitted from 25 October to 10 November 1939 in South Shields. Following the sinking of the armed merchant cruiser Rawalpindi on 23 November by the German battleships Scharnhorst and Gneisenau off Iceland, Mashona and the rest of the Home Fleet hunted the enemy ships, but heavy weather allowed them to evade their pursuers and return to Germany. The ship spent the next several months on convoy escort and patrol duties and Commander William Selby relieved McLaughlin on 23 January 1940. Around that time, she underwent a refit at Chatham Naval Dockyard that ended in March.

=== Norwegian Campaign ===
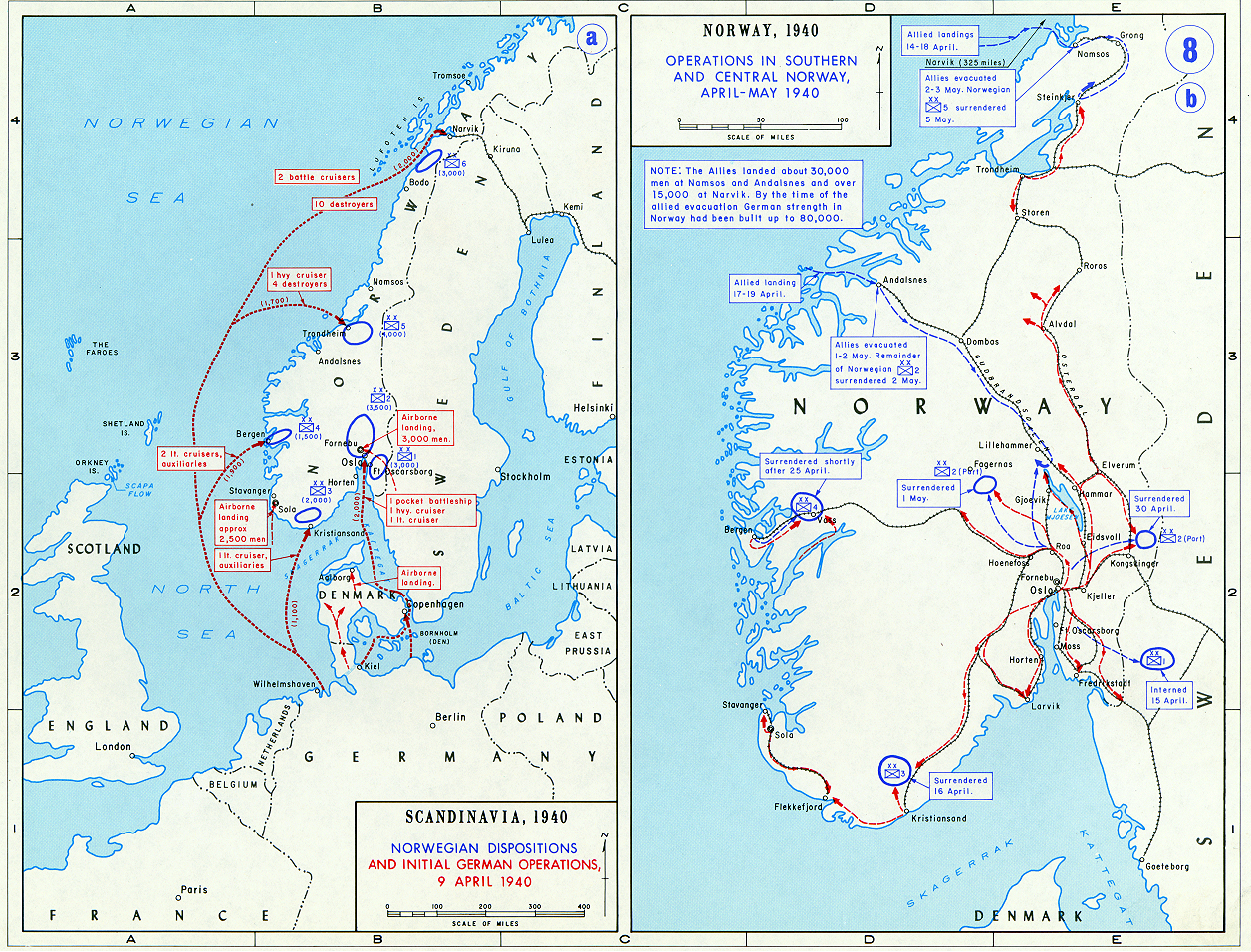
Maps covering the operations in central and southern Norway, April–May 1940

Receiving word that the Royal Air Force had attacked north-bound German warships in the North Sea on 7 April 1940, the Home Fleet put to sea that evening. The 2nd Cruiser Squadron departed Rosyth, Scotland, with its two light cruisers with orders to sweep through the North Sea before rendezvousing with the main body of the Home Fleet. The 6th DF with Mashona, her sisters Somali, Matabele, and Tartar, rendezvoused with the squadron the following morning. On the morning of 9 April the 4th Destroyer Flotilla, now including Mashona, was tasked on attacking Bergen, Norway, covered by the 18th Cruiser Squadron, but the Admiralty cancelled the attack that afternoon when it received reports that two German light cruisers were in port. As the British ships were withdrawing, they were attacked by 88 bombers of Bomber Wing 26 and Bomber Wing 30 (Kampfgeschwader 30), sinking Mashona's sister Gurkha and lightly damaged the battleship Rodney.

After refuelling at Scapa Flow the following day, Mashona, five of her sisters and two light cruisers departed on the evening of 11 April, arriving off Stadlandet the following morning. The destroyers were split up to search the area for German ships before rendezvousing with the cruisers at dusk, but an inaccurate spot report of a German battlecruiser and cruiser that afternoon, forestalled the searches as the destroyers were recalled. On the morning of 13 April the destroyers were sent to search the Romsdalsfjord and only found four merchant ships. As they were leaving Ålesund they were unsuccessfully attacked by a dozen bombers from III Group, Demonstration Wing 1 (Lehrgeschwader 1). The following morning they were ordered north to the Namsos area to examine its suitability for an Allied landing and to coordinate with local Norwegian forces. Harbour facilities were assessed as inadequate and that troops should be landed elsewhere and transferred to destroyers for off-loading at Namsos. The Admiralty ordered that the 148th Infantry Brigade, already at sea, to be diverted to the anchorage at Lillesjona; its troopships arrived there at dawn on 16 April and began transferring their troops to the destroyers after they had completed refuelling. Half-a-dozen Luftwaffe bombers disrupted the transfer that afternoon with little effect. The destroyers unloaded their troops that night and the rest of the troops arrived the following evening. The destroyers and their covering cruisers were ordered home on 19 April, Mashona and Sikh escorting the troopship MS Chrobry.

The Allied defeat during the Namsos Campaign forced them to evacuate the survivors. Mashona picked up the troops at Veblungsnes on the evening of 30 April and then helped to ferry troops from the small wharf at Åndalsnes out to the cruisers anchored in the harbour the following night. On 6 May, the destroyer was one of the escorts for the aircraft carrier Ark Royal in the Narvik area. The following month Mashona helped to escort the battleship Valiant as she covered the evacuation from Narvik on in early June. The destroyer searched without success for any survivors from the aircraft carrier Glorious after she had been sunk by Gneisenau and Scharnhorst on 8 June.

=== Subsequent operations ===
Mashona, Tartar and their sister Maori were ordered on 19 June 1940 to seize four Swedish destroyers that had been purchased from Fascist Italy and were on their delivery voyage, citing the right of angary, which allows for the taking of neutral property to prevent its use by the enemy. The Swedish government had informed the British and the Germans of this purchase and of the ships' route, so the British destroyers were able to blockade the Swedish ships in Skálafjørður in the Faeroe Islands the following morning, despite their earlier guarantee of freedom of passage. The Swedish crews were transferred under protest to their accompanying ocean liner, SS Patricia, and oil tanker, SS Castor, and the British ships put crews aboard two of the destroyers, Puke and Remus. The two Swedish destroyers sailed for Scapa Flow, escorted by Tartar, on 21 June, while the two Swedish civilian ships headed for Sweden. The commander of the Swedish force informed his government about the seizure and was ordered to return his two ships to Tórshavn and wait there until the ships were returned; Mashona also sailed to Tórshavn to prevent the Swedes from retaking possession of their ships. During the voyage to Scapa, Puke broke down on 22 June and had to be towed; she did not reach her destination for another week. In the meantime, Mashona escorted the other two other destroyers to Scapa where they arrived on the 26th. The ocean liner arrived on 30 June and the British returned the ships to the Swedes on 2 July in response to the strong Swedish protests.

While escorting the Home Fleet on 27 June in the North Sea, Mashona was damaged by a freak wave that dropped her into a deep trough; the impact damaged her bottom plating and sprung 240 rivets. The ship had to return to Rosyth for repairs that included strengthening the bottom of her hull and resumed her escort duties afterwards. She began a refit at Liverpool in August and was inspected by King George VI and Queen Elizabeth there before work began. Upon its completion on 5 October, Mashona was assigned escort duties in the Western Approaches and rescued survivors from the torpedoed cargo liner SS Rotorua on 11 December. While departing Scapa at night on 6 January 1941, Mashona accidentally rammed Sikh and was under repair in West Hartlepool from 16 January to 3 March. Mashona spent the next several months escorting units of the Home Fleet.

Map of Operation Rheinübung and Royal Navy operations against the Bismarck

On 22 May 1941 the ship formed part of the escort for Rodney and the ocean liner MV Britannic as they set sail for Halifax, Canada. After the German battleship Bismarck sank the battlecruiser Hood during the Battle of Denmark Strait two days later, Rodney was ordered by the Admiralty to join in the pursuit of the German ship, taking Mashona, Tartar and Somali with her in the search. By 26 May, the Bismarck had been located by a maritime patrol aircraft and Mashona was sent to find Admiral Sir John Tovey in his flagship, the battleship King George V. The destroyer was tasked to relay Rodney's location, using a signal lamp to avoid alerting the Germans of the presence of any nearby British ships via wireless intercepts. The battleships rendezvoused later that afternoon and Tovey was informed of Rodney's fuel shortage as well as that of her escorts. That evening Mashona, Tartar and Somali were forced to turn back for lack of fuel.

On the morning of 28 May 1941, Mashona and Tartar were attacked by numerous Luftwaffe bombers while returning to port at a speed of 15 knots (28 km/h; 17 mph). A Heinkel He 111 of the first group of Bomber Wing 28 (I/Kampfgeschwader 28) hit Mashona with a single bomb in the forward boiler room that caused severe flooding and killed 46 men. Dead in the water with a growing list, the flooding could not be contained and the crew was forced to abandon ship before she capsized. During a lull in the bombing, Tartar was able to rescue 184 survivors, although 10 subsequently died of hypothermia, but missed with a torpedo when she tried to scuttle her sister. The floating hulk was finally sunk off the coast of Galway, Ireland, at 52°58′N 11°36′W by shells from a pair of Canadian destroyers that arrived that afternoon.
