= Psilander affair =

Capture of four Swedish destroyers by the British Navy in 1940

- Part of Occupation of Faroe Islands and World War II
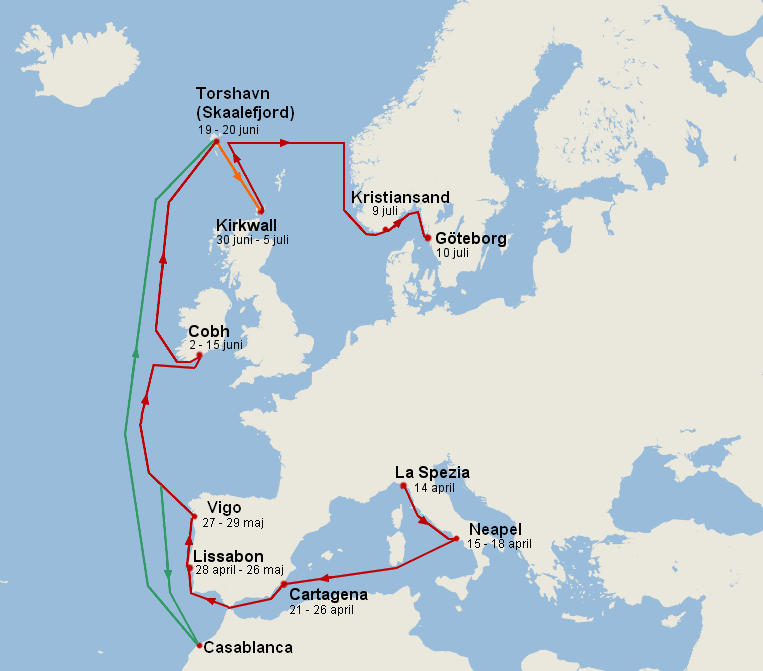
- Red: the route of Patricia and the four destroyers from La Spezia to Gothenburg. Green: the route of the tanker Castor
Date	20 June – 2 July 1940
Location	Skálafjørður, Faroe Islands
Result	Destroyers were returned to Sweden

Belligerents
United Kingdom	Sweden

Units involved
HMS Maori; HMS Mashona; HMS Tartar	HSwMS Psilander; HSwMS Puke; HSwMS Romulus; HSwMS Remus

Strength
3 fleet destroyers; naval drifters	4 destroyers

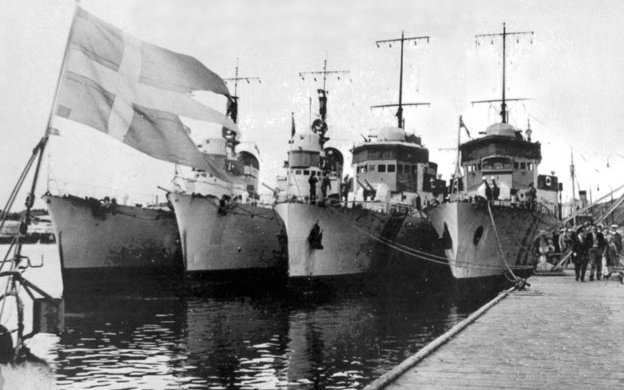
Remus, Romulus, Psilander and Puke in Gothenburg harbour after the British Royal Navy released them

The Psilander affair was an incident that occurred in Skálafjørður near Tórshavn in the Faroe Islands on 20 June 1940 in World War II. The British Royal Navy captured the four Swedish destroyers HSwMS Psilander, Puke, Romulus and Remus, together with the Swedish Lloyd passenger ship Patricia and the Trelleborgs Ångfartygs tanker Castor, despite the fact that Sweden was neutral.

The incident is said to have been triggered by the British concern that the German navy would otherwise capture the ships and take them into German service when they left the North Sea, citing right of angary. The four destroyers were recently bought in Italy and were on their way from La Spezia to Gothenburg when they were captured. On 2 July 1940, after diplomatic negotiations, the vessels were returned to the Swedish crews. Afterwards, the vessels reached Gothenburg on 10 July 1940.

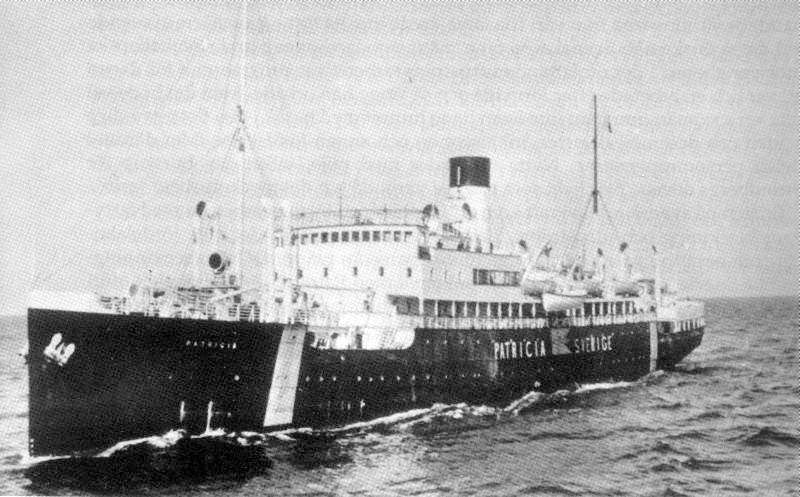
Patricia in March 1940 on her way from Sweden to La Spezia

The Swedish Navy had chartered Patricia to take the crews for the destroyers from Sweden to Italy, and accompanied them on their return voyage. After the crew did work to adopt them, they left La Spezia on 14 April.

Due to a collision caused by a machine breakdown they needed repair in Cartagena, Spain. The Italian Chief of Navy called the Swedish attaché at the Swedish embassy and advised the ships to go home as soon as possible, which later has been interpreted as proof that he knew about Hitler's planned attack on France, which began on 10 May.

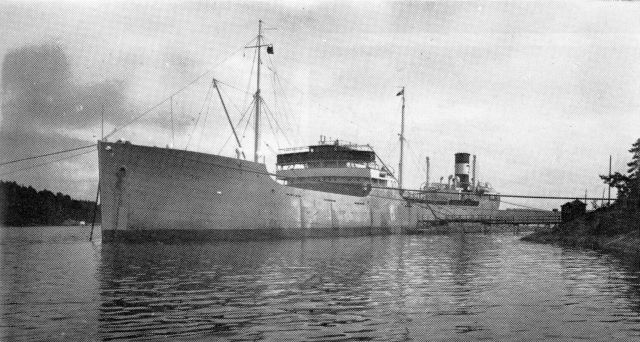
The tanker Castor before the Second World War

The destroyers did not have fuel bunkers large enough to go from Italy to Sweden. The Swedish Navy had a confirmed order on bunker fuel in Lisbon, but did not get any. A Swedish civilian tanker, Castor, was transporting oil and diesel from Mexico to Sweden. The Swedish Navy chartered her, made her a naval ship and diverted her to Lisbon, where she refuelled the destroyers.

All six ships headed for Cobh, Ireland, where Swedish citizens who had been living in Great Britain and Ireland boarded Patricia. They continued to the Faroe Islands, as the English Channel was a war zone. Castor had fairly low speed which would make the destroyers consume more fuel, so a decision was made to let Castor proceed independently.

At the Faroe Islands, which the UK had occupied, the Royal Navy on order from its government seized the destroyers. The British squadron was ordered to ask the Swedish Commodore to sail his ships to a British port. If he refused the British squadron was to sink the Swedish ships.

The commander of the Swedish ships, Lieutenant Commander Torsten Hagman, withdrew his crews to the Patricia leaving the ships for the British to seize. Since Sweden was not at war with the UK and had little hope of prevailing in a battle, the commander acquiesced to British demands. Later, Hagman was heavily criticised by others in the Swedish Navy for surrendering without firing a shot.

The British placed crews on the destroyers and began to sail them to Scapa Flow. After a few days and after the British government received assurances from Sweden and paid £50,000 for any damage caused all ships were released to the Swedish Navy. Germany guaranteed Swedish neutrality and allowed the ships to go to Sweden. On 5 July they left heading for Sweden and arrived on 10 July. The commander was court-martialed, but was found neither guilty nor innocent. The media and politicians, including then Prime Minister Per Albin Hansson supported Hagman's decision, but officers across the Swedish armed forces saw him as a coward in battle. A secret order was made to never give up a ship to another country for any reason unless ordered.

== See also ==
- British occupation of the Faroe Islands
