= Franco Garofalo (admiral) =

Italian admiral (1898–1970)

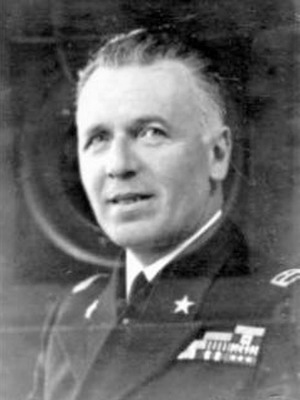
- Born: 9 June 1898; Rome, Kingdom of Italy
- Died: 10 April 1970 (aged 71); Rome, Italy
- Military career
- Allegiance: Kingdom of Italy; Italy
- Branch: Regia Marina; Italian Navy
- Rank: Vice Admiral
- Commands: X Destroyer Squadron; Fleet Destroyer Group
- Conflicts: Italo-Turkish War; World War I; World War II
- Awards: Bronze Medal of Military Valor; Order of the Crown of Italy; Order of Saints Maurice and Lazarus

Franco Garofalo (Rome, 9 June 1898 – 10 April 1970) was an Italian admiral during World War II.

== Biography ==
He was born in Rome on 9 June 1898 and entered the Naval Academy of Livorno in 1912, participating in the Italo-Turkish War as a cadet officer. He graduated with the rank of ensign in 1916, and during the First World War he served on the battleship Giulio Cesare and on the armored cruiser San Marco.

After promotion to lieutenant commander in 1928, between 1929 and 1932 he was in command of destroyers; in 1933 he was promoted to commander and served at the Ministry of the Navy, initially in the office of the Chief of Staff and later in the Directorate General for Personnel. In 1936 he became deputy chief of staff of the 1st Naval Division and later he was given command of a squadron of destroyers.

After having taught for a year at the Institute of Maritime Warfare, with the rank of captain, from September 1938 to January 1941 he was commander of the X Destroyer Squadron, composed of the four Maestrale-class destroyers. With the entry of the Kingdom of Italy in the Second World War, he took part in numerous escort missions, being awarded a Bronze Medal of Military Valor. He was later appointed deputy commander of the Naval Academy until August 1943, when he assumed command of the Fleet Destroyer Group, with the light cruiser Attilio Regolo as flagship.

When the Armistice of Cassibile was announced, on 8 September 1943, Garofalo was in La Spezia, and boarded the battleship Italia when the fleet set sail for La Maddalena in the early hours of 9 September. Off the Bocche di Bonifacio, the fleet was attacked by the Luftwaffe, which sank the flagship Roma, killing Admiral Carlo Bergamini, the commander-in-chief. Admiral Romeo Oliva assumed command and headed for Malta, where the fleet arrived on the following day. Italia and Vittorio Veneto were then interned in the Great Bitter Lake.

In January 1944 Garofalo returned to Italy and was promoted to rear admiral, assuming the position of head of the press office at the Cabinet of the Minister of the Navy and the direction of the magazine Buona Guardia, widespread among the crews of the fleet.

From 5 May to 10 June 1946 he was aide-de-camp to King Umberto II. He retired from active service in 1947, being promoted to vice admiral in 1954 and becoming a writer and historian. He died in Rome on April 10, 1970.
