= Carlo Pinna =

Italian admiral

- Born: 9 July 1892; Turin, Kingdom of Italy
- Died: 22 September 1972 (aged 80); Rome, Italy
- Military career
- Allegiance: Kingdom of Italy; Italy
- Branch: Regia Marina; Italian Navy
- Service years: 1910-1951
- Rank: Admiral
- Commands: Lorenzo Marcello (submarine); Vettor Pisani (submarine); Emanuele Pessagno (destroyer); Fiume (heavy cruiser); Tunisia Naval Command; Genoa Naval Command; Autonomous Naval Command Sicily
- Conflicts: Italo-Turkish War; World War I; Adriatic Campaign of World War I; Second Italo-Ethiopian War; World War II; Tunisian campaign
- Awards: Bronze Medal of Military Valor; War Cross for Military Valor; War Merit Cross; Order of the Crown of Italy; Order of Saints Maurice and Lazarus; Colonial Order of the Star of Italy

Carlo Pinna (Turin, 9 July 1892 – Rome, 22 September 1972) was an Italian admiral during World War II.

== Biography ==
=== Early life and career ===
He was born in Turin on 9 July 1892 and entered the Royal Naval Academy of Livorno in 1910, graduating with the rank of ensign in 1913. In 1911–1912, while still an officer cadet, he participated in the Italo-Turkish War aboard the protected cruiser Etna. In the early stages of the First World War, with the rank of sub-lieutenant, he served on the battleship Regina Elena; in 1917 he was promoted to lieutenant and assigned to the Italian naval base in Vlore, after which he served on the submarines F 13 and F 17 in the final months of the war. After the war, he served on various warships and from 1922 to 1925 he was in command of submarines, after which he was promoted to lieutenant commander and assigned to the naval general staff until 1927.

From 1927 to 1929 he commanded the submarines Lorenzo Marcello and Vettor Pisani; in 1929 he was promoted to commander and again assigned to the general staff of the Navy until 1932, after which he was executive officer of the heavy cruiser Gorizia for two years and then commanding officer of the destroyer Emanuele Pessagno and its squadron in 1934–1935. In 1935 he was promoted to captain and assigned to the general staff of the Italian armed forces in 1935–1936; during this period he accompanied Marshal of Italy Pietro Badoglio, Chief of General Staff, to East Africa during the Second Italo-Ethiopian War. From 1936 to 1938 he commanded the heavy cruiser Fiume, then the CREM school in Pola and finally the Naval College of Venice.

=== World War II and later years ===
At the outbreak of the Second World War he was once again assigned to Supermarina. In 1941 he was promoted to rear admiral and in 1943 to vice admiral; in February 1943 he became the last Italian naval commander in Tunisia, replacing Luigi Biancheri. From his headquarters in Bizerte he oversaw the arrival of supply convoys from Italy during the final months of the Tunisian campaign; in early May 1943, as the fighting in Africa neared its end, he moved from Bizerte to Tunis and then to Kelibia, where on 10 May he boarded with much of his staff the hospital ship Aquileia bound for Italy, where he arrived on 13 May, the day of the final surrender of all Axis forces in Tunisia.

He was then appointed naval commander of Genoa, a post he held when the Armistice of Cassibile was announced on 8 September 1943. As German forces moved to occupy Italy, Pinna ordered all seaworthy merchant and naval vessels to sail for Allied-controlled ports, and all unseaworthy ships to be scuttled; he was then authorized by Admiral Luigi Sansonetti to leave Genoa, so as not to be captured by the Germans. He did so after releasing all his personnel from service and destroying all secret documents; he then reached Florence and joined the local Resistance group "Brigata V", which cooperated with the Office of Strategic Services.

After the end of the war, Pinna held the Autonomous Naval Command of Sicily from 1945 to 1947 and was then at disposal of the Naval Department of La Spezia until 1951, when he was transferred to the naval reserve. He was promoted to Fleet Admiral in 1957, and died in Rome in 1972.
