= Sella-class destroyer =

1920s Italian destroyers in World War II

- Sella at anchor

Class overview
- Builders: Pattison, Naples
- Operators: Regia Marina; Swedish Navy; Kriegsmarine
- Built: 1923–1927
- In commission: 1926–1940s
- Completed: 4
- Lost: 2
- Scrapped: 2

General characteristics (as built)
- Type: Destroyer
- Displacement: 970 t (950 long tons) (standard); 1,480 t (1,460 long tons) (full load)
- Length: 84.9 m (278 ft 7 in)
- Beam: 8.6 m (28 ft 3 in)
- Draught: 2.7 m (8 ft 10 in)
- Installed power: 3 Thornycroft boilers; 36,000 shp (27,000 kW)
- Propulsion: 2 shafts; 2 geared steam turbines
- Speed: 33 knots (61 km/h; 38 mph)
- Range: 3,600 nmi (6,700 km; 4,100 mi) at 14 knots (26 km/h; 16 mph)
- Complement: 152–153
- Armament: 1 × twin, 1 × single 120 mm (4.7 in) guns; 2 × single 40 mm (1.6 in) AA guns; 2 × single 13.2 mm (0.52 in) machine guns; 2 × twin 533 mm (21 in) torpedo tubes; 32 mines

The Sella-class destroyers were a group of four destroyers built for the Regia Marina (Royal Italian Navy) in the 1920s. Two of these ships fought in World War II and both were sunk after the Italian capitulation to the Allies. The two other ships were sold to the Swedish Navy in 1940 and were scrapped in the late 1940s.

These ships formed the basis for most subsequent destroyers built by the Italians, but were disappointing in service with unreliable machinery.

== Design and description ==
The Sella-class destroyers were enlarged and improved versions of the preceding Palestro and Curtatone class. They had an overall length of 84.9 meters (278 ft 7 in), a beam of 8.6 meters (28 ft 3 in) and a draft of 2.7 meters (8 ft 10 in). They displaced 970 metric tons (950 long tons) at standard load, and 1,480 metric tons (1,460 long tons) at deep load. Their complement was 8–9 officers and 144 enlisted men.

The Sellas were powered by two Parsons geared steam turbines, each driving one propeller shaft using steam supplied by three Yarrow boilers. The turbines were rated at 36,000 shaft horsepower (27,000 kW) for a speed of 33 knots (61 km/h; 38 mph) in service, although the ships reached speeds in excess of 37 knots (69 km/h; 43 mph) during their sea trials while lightly loaded. They carried enough fuel oil to give them a range of 3,600 nautical miles (6,700 km; 4,100 mi) at a speed of 14 knots (26 km/h; 16 mph).

Their main battery consisted of three 120-millimeter (4.7 in) guns in one twin-gun turret aft of the superstructure and one single-gun turret forward of it. Anti-aircraft (AA) defense for the Sella-class ships was provided by a pair of 40-millimeter (1.6 in) AA guns in single mounts amidships and a pair of 13.2-millimeter (0.52 in) machine guns. They were equipped with four 533-millimeter (21 in) torpedo tubes in two twin mounts amidships. The Sellas could also carry 32 mines.

== Ships ==
Construction data
Ship name	Namesake	Builder	Completed	Fate
Francesco Crispi	Francesco Crispi	Pattison	29 April 1927	Seized by the Germans after the Italian Armistice, September 1943; served as TA15, sunk by air attack in the Aegean Sea, 8 March 1944
Quintino Sella	Quintino Sella	Pattison	25 March 1926	Sunk by German E-boats in the Adriatic Sea, 11 September 1943
Bettino Ricasoli	Bettino Ricasoli	Pattison	11 December 1926	Sold to the Swedish Navy as HSwMS Puke
Giovanni Nicotera	Giovanni Nicotera	Pattison	8 January 1927	Sold to the Swedish Navy as the HSwMS Psilander

== Service history ==
During the war, the destroyers were based at the island of Leros, in the Dodecanese. They took part in the Italian retaking of Kastelorizo (named Operation Abstention by the British) on 27 February 1941, and were used as mother ships for the successful attack by explosive motor boats on HMS York on 25 March. Crispi led the landing of an Italian division on Sitia, Crete, on 28 May 1941, in the course of the battle of Crete.

== Bibliography ==
- Birchfield, B.; Borgenstam, Carl; Caruana, Joseph & Frampton, Viktor (1988). "Question 3/87". Warship International. XXV (2): 205–210. ISSN 0043-0374.
- Brescia, Maurizio (2012). Mussolini's Navy: A Reference Guide to the Regina Marina 1930–45. Annapolis, Maryland: Naval Institute Press. ISBN 978-1-59114-544-8.
- Campbell, John (1985). Naval Weapons of World War Two. Annapolis, Maryland: Naval Institute Press. p. 336. ISBN 0-87021-459-4.
- Fraccaroli, Aldo (1968). Italian Warships of World War II. Shepperton, UK: Ian Allan. ISBN 0-7110-0002-6.
- Roberts, John (1980). "Italy". In Chesneau, Roger (ed.). Conway's All the World's Fighting Ships 1922–1946. New York: Mayflower Books. pp. 280–317. ISBN 0-8317-0303-2.
- Rohwer, Jürgen (2005). Chronology of the War at Sea 1939–1945: The Naval History of World War Two (Third Revised ed.). Annapolis, Maryland: Naval Institute Press. ISBN 1-59114-119-2.
- Smigielski, Adam (1995). "Italy". In Chumbley, Stephen (ed.). Conway's All the World's Fighting Ships 1947-1995. Annapolis, Maryland: Naval Institute Press. pp. 195–218. ISBN 1-55750-132-7.
- Whitley, M. J. (1988). Destroyers of World War 2: An International Encyclopedia. Annapolis, Maryland: Naval Institute Press. ISBN 1-85409-521-8.
