= Italian destroyer Quintino Sella =

Destroyer of the Regia Marina

- Quintilino Sella before the war

History

Kingdom of Italy
- Name: Quintino Sella
- Namesake: Quintino Sella
- Builder: Pattinson, Naples
- Laid down: 12 October 1922
- Launched: 25 April 1925
- Completed: 25 March 1926
- Fate: Sunk by torpedo, 11 September 1943

General characteristics (as built)
- Class & type: Sella-class destroyer
- Displacement: 970 t (950 long tons) (standard); 1,480 t (1,460 long tons) (full load)
- Length: 84.9 m (278 ft 7 in)
- Beam: 8.6 m (28 ft 3 in)
- Draught: 2.7 m (8 ft 10 in)
- Installed power: 3 Thornycroft boilers; 36,000 shp (27,000 kW)
- Propulsion: 2 shafts; 2 geared steam turbines
- Speed: 33 knots (61 km/h; 38 mph)
- Range: 3,600 nmi (6,700 km; 4,100 mi) at 14 knots (26 km/h; 16 mph)
- Complement: 152–153
- Armament: 1 × twin, 1 × single 120 mm (4.7 in) guns; 2 × single 40 mm (1.6 in) AA guns; 2 × single 13.2 mm (0.52 in) machine guns; 2 × twin 533 mm (21 in) torpedo tubes; 32 mines

Quintino Sella was the lead ship of her class of four destroyers built for the Regia Marina (Royal Italian Navy) in the 1920s. Completed in 1926, she served in World War II.

== Design and description ==
The Sella-class destroyers were enlarged and improved versions of the preceding Palestro and Curtatone classes. They had an overall length of 84.9 meters (279 ft), a beam of 8.6 meters (28 ft 3 in) and a mean draft of 2.7 meters (8 ft 10 in). They displaced 970 metric tons (950 long tons) at standard load, and 1,480 metric tons (1,460 long tons) at deep load. Their complement was 8–9 officers and 144 enlisted men.

The Sellas were powered by two Parsons geared steam turbines, each driving one propeller shaft using steam supplied by three Thornycroft boilers. The turbines were rated at 36,000 shaft horsepower (27,000 kW) for a speed of 33 knots (61 km/h; 38 mph) in service, although Quintino Sella reached a speed of 37.3 knots (69.1 km/h; 42.9 mph) from 35,090 shp (26,170 kW) during her sea trials while lightly loaded. The ships carried enough fuel oil to give them a range of 1,800 nautical miles (3,300 km; 2,100 mi) at a speed of 14 knots (26 km/h; 16 mph).

Their main battery consisted of four 120-millimeter (4.7 in) guns in one twin-gun turret aft of the superstructure and one single-gun turret forward of it. Anti-aircraft (AA) defense for the Sella-class ships was provided by a pair of 40-millimeter (1.6 in) AA guns in single mounts amidships and a pair of 13.2-millimeter (0.52 in) machine guns. They were equipped with four 533-millimeter (21 in) torpedo tubes in two twin mounts amidships. The Sellas could also carry 32 mines.

== Construction and career ==
Quintino Sella was laid down by Pattinson at their Naples shipyard on 12 October 1922, launched on 25 April 1925 and commissioned on 25 March 1926.

== Fate ==
In the afternoon of 11 September 1943 during Operation Achse, at 4:50 p.m., S 54 stopped the Italian steamer Pontinia (715 GRT) about 30 nm south of Venice and she was taken as a prize. At 5:45 p.m., the approaching Quintino Sella, which was actually on her way to Taranto to surrender to the British, was sunk with two torpedoes from the Kriegsmarine S-boats S 54 under tactical leader Oberleutnant zur See Klaus-Degenhard Schmidt and S 61 under Oberleutnant zur See Axel von Gernet. The captain Corrado Cini, seriously wounded (he later had to suffer the amputation of a leg), Chief Engineer Guido Cervone, also wounded, and most of the survivors were rescued by order of Schmidt and brought to Pontinia and Leopardi, others were rescued later by Italian fishing boats. A total of 27 crew members of the ship perished, but also many of the 300 civilians from Venice, which Quintino Sella had on board.

In 1956, an unsuccessful attempt was made to recover the ship. The wreck was again identified in 1972, in good condition, and was partially dismantled to recover metals.

== Bibliography ==
- Brescia, Maurizio (2012). Mussolini's Navy: A Reference Guide to the Regina Marina 1930–45. Annapolis, Maryland: Naval Institute Press. ISBN 978-1-59114-544-8.
- Fraccaroli, Aldo (1968). Italian Warships of World War II. Shepperton, UK: Ian Allan. ISBN 0-7110-0002-6.
- Greene, Jack & Massignani, Alessandro (1998). The Naval War in the Mediterranean, 1940–1943. London: Chatham Publishing. ISBN 1-86176-057-4.
- McMurtrie, Francis E., ed. (1937). Jane's Fighting Ships 1937. London: Sampson Low. OCLC 927896922.
- O'Hara, Vincent P. (2009). Struggle for the Middle Sea: The Great Navies at War in the Mediterranean Theater, 1940–1945. Annapolis, Maryland: Naval Institute Press. ISBN 978-1-59114-648-3.
- Roberts, John (1980). "Italy". In Chesneau, Roger (ed.). Conway's All the World's Fighting Ships 1922–1946. New York: Mayflower Books. pp. 280–317. ISBN 0-8317-0303-2.
- Rohwer, Jürgen (2005). Chronology of the War at Sea 1939–1945: The Naval History of World War Two (Third Revised ed.). Annapolis, Maryland: Naval Institute Press. ISBN 1-59114-119-2.
- Whitley, M. J. (1988). Destroyers of World War 2: An International Encyclopedia. Annapolis, Maryland: Naval Institute Press. ISBN 1-85409-521-8.
