= Italian destroyer Francesco Crispi =

Destroyer of the Regia Marina

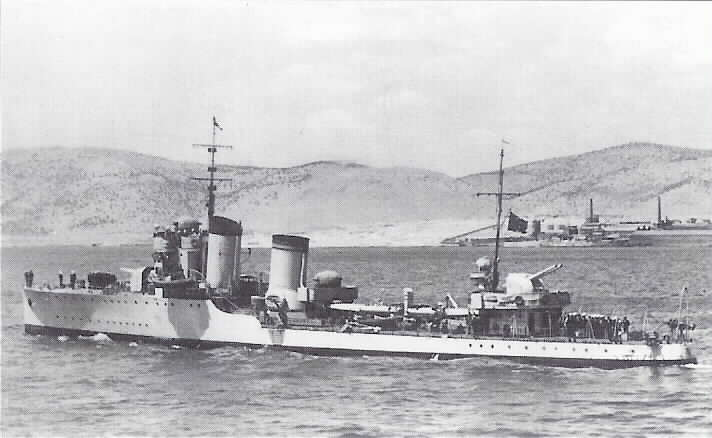
- Francesco Crispi in 1927

History

Kingdom of Italy
- Name: Francesco Crispi
- Namesake: Francesco Crispi
- Builder: Pattinson, Naples
- Laid down: 21 February 1923
- Launched: 12 September 1925
- Completed: 29 April 1927
- Fate: Captured by the Germans, 9 September 1943

Germany
- Name: TA15
- Acquired: 9 September 1943
- Commissioned: 30 October 1943
- Fate: Sunk by aircraft, 8 March 1944; Refloated and later scuttled

General characteristics (as built)
- Class & type: Sella-class destroyer
- Displacement: 970 t (950 long tons) (standard); 1,480 t (1,460 long tons) (full load)
- Length: 84.9 m (278 ft 7 in)
- Beam: 8.6 m (28 ft 3 in)
- Draught: 2.7 m (8 ft 10 in)
- Installed power: 3 Thornycroft boilers; 36,000 shp (27,000 kW)
- Propulsion: 2 shafts; 2 geared steam turbines
- Speed: 33 knots (61 km/h; 38 mph)
- Range: 3,600 nmi (6,700 km; 4,100 mi) at 14 knots (26 km/h; 16 mph)
- Complement: 152–153
- Armament: 1 × twin, 1 × single 120 mm (4.7 in) guns; 2 × single 40 mm (1.6 in) AA guns; 2 × single 13.2 mm (0.52 in) machine guns; 2 × twin 533 mm (21 in) torpedo tubes; 32 mines

Francesco Crispi was one of four Sella-class destroyers built for the Regia Marina (Royal Italian Navy) in the 1920s. Completed in 1927, she served in World War II.

== Design and description ==
The Sella-class destroyers were enlarged and improved versions of the preceding Palestro and Curtatone classes. They had an overall length of 84.9 meters (279 ft), a beam of 8.6 meters (28 ft 3 in) and a mean draft of 2.7 meters (8 ft 10 in). They displaced 970 metric tons (950 long tons) at standard load, and 1,480 metric tons (1,460 long tons) at deep load. Their complement was 8–9 officers and 144 enlisted men.

Unlike the Parsons geared steam turbines used by her sister ships, Francesco Crispi used a pair of Belluzzo turbines, each driving one propeller shaft using steam supplied by three Thornycroft boilers. The turbines were rated at 36,000 shaft horsepower (27,000 kW) for a speed of 33 knots (61 km/h; 38 mph) in service, although the ship reached a speed of 38.6 knots (71.5 km/h; 44.4 mph) from 35,540 shp (26,500 kW) during her sea trials while lightly loaded. The Sellas carried enough fuel oil to give them a range of 1,800 nautical miles (3,300 km; 2,100 mi) at a speed of 14 knots (26 km/h; 16 mph).

Their main battery consisted of four 120-millimeter (4.7 in) guns in one twin-gun turret aft of the superstructure and one single-gun turret forward of it. Anti-aircraft (AA) defense for the Sella-class ships was provided by a pair of 40-millimeter (1.6 in) AA guns in single mounts amidships and a pair of 13.2-millimeter (0.52 in) machine guns. They were equipped with four 533-millimeter (21 in) torpedo tubes in two twin mounts amidships. The Sellas could also carry 32 mines.

== Construction ==
Francesco Crispi was laid down by Pattinson at their Naples shipyard on 21 February 1923, launched on 12 September 1925 and commissioned on 29 April 1927.
