= Curtatone-class destroyer =

Italian naval ship class (1924–1951)

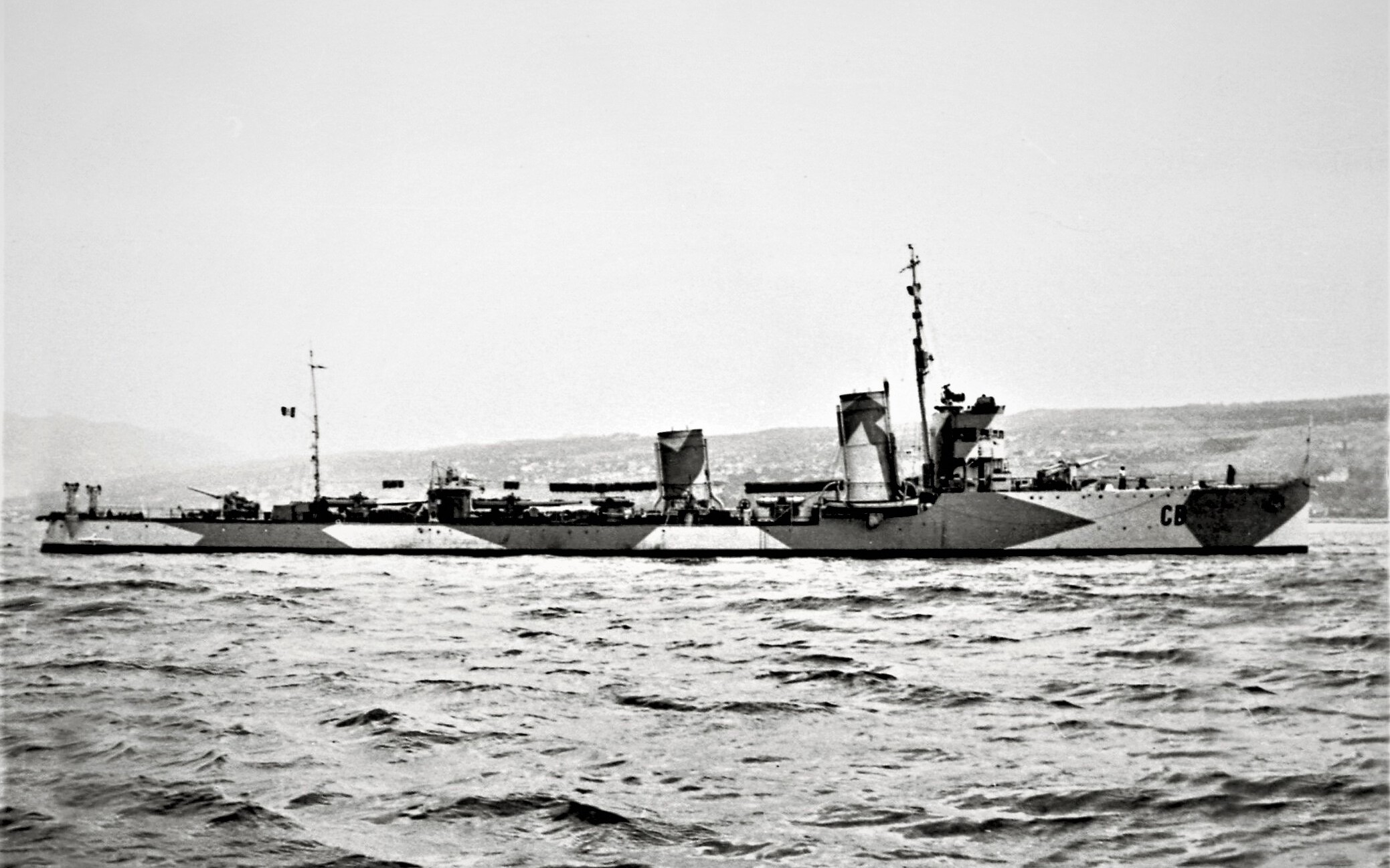
- Castelfidardo off Fiume in 1942

Class overview
- Builders: Cantiere navale fratelli Orlando, Livorno
- Operators: Regia Marina; Kriegsmarine
- Preceded by: Generali class
- Succeeded by: Spica class
- Built: 1920–1924
- In commission: 1924–1951
- Completed: 4
- Lost: 3
- Retired: 1

General characteristics
- Type: Destroyer
- Displacement: 876 long tons (890 t) standard; 890 long tons (900 t) full load
- Length: 84.72 m (277 ft 11 in)
- Beam: 8 m (26 ft 3 in)
- Draught: 2.46 m (8 ft 1 in)
- Propulsion: 2 shaft Zoelly steam turbines; 4 Thornycroft type boilers; 22,000 hp (16,400 kW)
- Speed: 32 knots (59 km/h; 37 mph)
- Range: 1,800 nmi (3,300 km) at 15 knots (28 km/h; 17 mph)
- Complement: 117
- Armament: 4 × 102 mm guns (2 × 2); 2 × 76 mm AA guns (2 × 2); 6 × 13.2 mm machine guns; 6 × 450 mm (18 in) torpedo tubes (2 × 3); 16 mines

The Curtatone-class was a series of four destroyers built for the Regia Marina. Ordered during World War I as Palestro-class destroyers, construction was delayed due to supply shortages. The last Palestro-class vessels were lengthened in an attempt to improve speed, which were developed into the Curtatone-class. The destroyers were the first in the world to be equipped with twin guns and first in the Italian fleet to feature smaller design changes.

In 1938, the vessels were old and redesignated as torpedo boats. The ships primarily operated as convoy escorts during World War II. Curtatone struck a mine and sank in 1941, while Calatafimi and Castelfidardo were captured by German officials and pressed into the Kriegsmarine in 1943. The vessels were renamed, and were both sunk in 1944. Monzambano remained under Italian control and survived the war before she was scrapped in 1951.

== Development and design ==
During the First World War, the Regia Marina required additional surface escorts to guard against attacks by the Austro-Hungarian Navy and German U-boats in the Mediterranean. Of the 32 destroyers ordered as part of the effort, 20 of them were not laid down during the war due to supply shortages. Included were the Palestro-class destroyers, which were launched in 1919 and 1920. The four ships of the Palestro-class were based on the earlier Audace-class destroyer and was intended to comprise eight destroyers. However, experience with Palestro saw the design for the last four ships lengthened by 4.51 metres (14.8 ft) in an attempt to achieve higher speeds. The lengthened ships were given a new armament and became known as the Curtatone-class.

The ships that became the Curtatone-class was ordered on 31 December 1915 as part of the Palestro-class. They were 84.72 m (277 ft 11 in) long at the waterline and 84.6 m (277 ft 7 in) long overall, with a beam of 8 m (26 ft 3 in) and a mean draft of 2.46 m (8 ft 1 in). They displaced 876 long tons (890 t) standard and up to 1,210 long tons (1,230 t) at full load with a crew of 6 to 7 officers and about 110 enlisted men. The ships were powered by two Zoelly steam turbines, with steam provided by four Thornycroft boilers. The engines were rated to produce 22,000 shaft horsepower (16,000 kW) for a top speed of 32 knots (59 km/h; 37 mph) with a bunkerage of 200 long tons (200 t) of coal. The ships could cruise for 2,200 nautical miles (4,100 km; 2,500 mi) at an economical speed of 15 knots (28 km/h; 17 mph) or 460 knots (850 km/h; 530 mph) at 28 knots (52 km/h; 32 mph). The Italian government paid shipyards a bonus if their warships exceeded the speed requirement. As a result, the shipyards ran sea trials on new ships without armament and other equipment to achieve an unrealistically high speed. The top speed of each ship in the class was between 33.3–33.6 knots (61.7–62.2 km/h; 38.3–38.7 mph).

Italian naval doctrine emphasized rangefinders and powerful guns to destroy the enemy at long range, compared to other nations which focused on a destroyer's torpedoes and escort ability. The class's main armament was two 4 in (10 cm) M1919 guns mounted in twin turrets on the centerline fore and aft. They were the first destroyers in the world to be fitted with twin guns as a predecessor to the mass adoption of twin 4.7 in (12 cm) guns throughout the Italian destroyer fleet. In addition, the ships were equipped with two 17.7 in (45 cm) triple torpedo tubes, two 3 in (7.6 cm) anti-aircraft guns, and 16 mines. Almost all Italian destroyers of the era were equipped for minelaying and used to create defensive minefields around the country.

== Service history ==
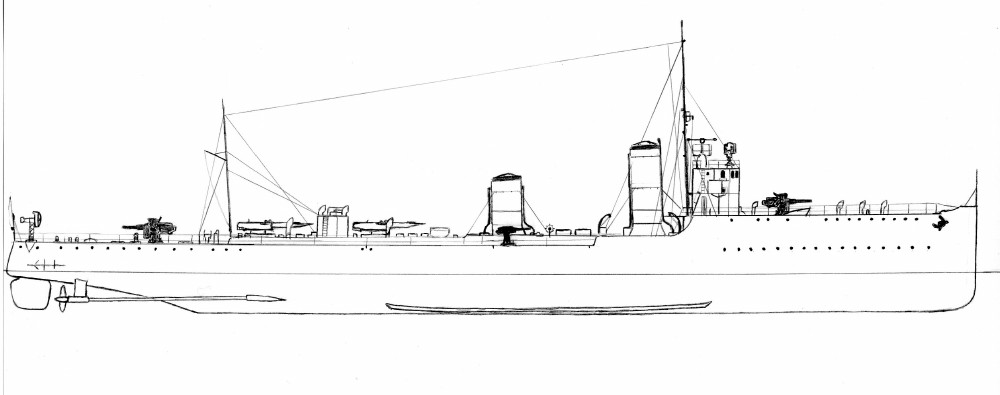
Line drawing of Curtatone in her 1942 arrangement

All four destroyers were built by Cantiere navale fratelli Orlando at the company's shipyard in Livorno. They were laid down between 1920 and 1921, and commissioned between 1923 and 1924. Like the Palestro-class, the ships were named after battles during the Italian Wars of Independence and Italian Unification. On 1 October 1938, the two classes were redesignated as torpedo boats. The Regia Marina believed that the destroyers were too old to be effective in combat or operate with a fleet, and thus reused World War I-era destroyers as convoy escorts.

At the start of World War II, the ships formed the 16th Torpedo boat Division and were tasked with defending La Spezia. Between late 1940 and 1943, the ships were reassigned to protect convoys operating between Albania and Italy in the Adriatic, alongside other tasks in the Aegean.

The ships were later modernized for escort duties with the twin guns being replaced by singles and the triple 450-millimetre (18 in) torpedo tubes replaced by twin 533 mm (21.0 in) torpedo tubes. Extra light anti-aircraft guns were also fitted and the 76 mm (3.0 in)/40 caliber guns removed.

== Ships in class ==
Data
Name	Laid down	Launched	Commissioned	Service/Fate
Calatafimi	1 December 1920	17 March 1923	24 May 1924	Captured by the Germans at Piraeus on 9 September 1943 - served as TA19, sunk by Greek submarine Pipinos 19 August 1944 in the Aegean Sea.
Castelfidardo	20 July 1920	4 June 1922	7 March 1924	Captured by the Germans at Piraeus on 9 September 1943 - served as TA16, sunk by Allied aircraft 2 June 1944 in the Aegean.
Curtatone	3 January 1920	17 March 1922	21 June 1923	Sunk by a mine near Athens on 20 May 1941.
Monzambano	20 January 1921	6 August 1923	4 June 1924	Survived the war. It was decommissioned in April 1951.
