= Adriatic campaign of World War II =

Minor naval campaign fought during World War II

Adriatic campaign
- Part of Mediterranean and Middle East Theatre of the Second World War
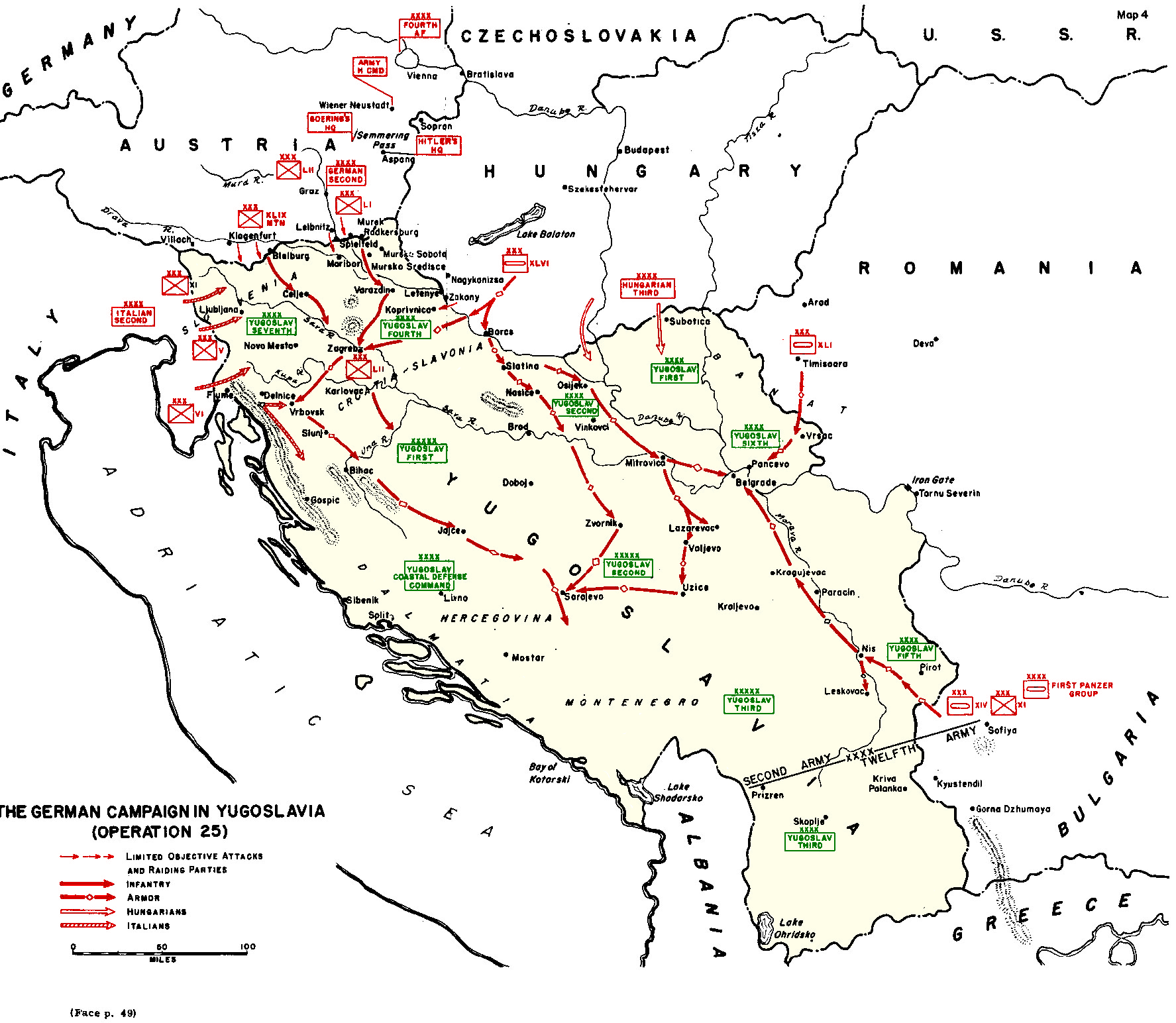
- Adriatic Sea in 1941, during the Axis invasion of Yugoslavia
Date	7 April 1939 – 15 May 1945 (6 years, 1 month, 1 week and 1 day)
Location	Adriatic Sea: Yugoslavia, Italy, Greece, Albania
Result	Allied victory

Belligerents
Allies: United Kingdom: India; Yugoslavia (in 1941); DF Yugoslavia (from 1943); Greece; Free France; Albania (Kingdom of Italy) Italy (from 8 September 1943); Australia; New Zealand; South Africa; Poland; United States (from 1941); Canada	Axis: Italy (until 8 September 1943); Germany; Italian Social Republic (from September 1943); Croatia; Slovene collaborationists Montenegro; Albania (until 1944)

Commanders and leaders
(United Kingdom) Harold Alexander; (United Kingdom) Claude Auchinleck; (United Kingdom) Archibald Wavell; (United Kingdom) Henry Wilson; (Kingdom of Greece) Alexander Papagos; (Democratic Federal Yugoslavia) Josip Broz Tito; Enver Hoxha	(Fascist Italy) Domenico Cavagnari; (Fascist Italy) Arturo Riccardi; (Fascist Italy) Vittorio Tur; (Fascist Italy) Prince Ferdinando; (Fascist Italy) Luigi Spalice; (Fascist Italy) Romolo Polacchini; (Nazi Germany) Alexander Löhr; (Nazi Germany) Joachim Lietzmann; (Independent State of Croatia) Ante Pavelić; Leon Rupnik

The Adriatic campaign of World War II was a minor naval campaign fought during World War II between the Greek, Yugoslavian and Italian navies, the Kriegsmarine, and the Mediterranean squadrons of the United Kingdom, France, and the Yugoslav Partisan naval forces. Considered a somewhat insignificant part of the naval warfare in World War II, it nonetheless saw interesting developments, given the specificity of the Dalmatian coastline.

== Prelude – Italian invasion of Albania ==
On 7 April 1939, Mussolini's troops occupied Albania, overthrew King Zog, and annexed the country to the Italian Empire. Naval operations in the Adriatic consisted mostly of transport organisation through the ports of Taranto, as well as coastal bombardment in support of the landings on the Albanian coast. The Italian naval forces involved in the invasion of Albania included the battleships Giulio Cesare and Conte di Cavour, three heavy cruisers, three light cruisers, nine destroyers, fourteen torpedo boats, one minelayer, ten auxiliary ships and nine transport ships. The ships were divided into four groups, which carried out landings at Vlorë, Durrës, Sarandë and Shëngjin.

When Italy entered World War II, on 10 June 1940, the Italian Navy's main naval bases in the Adriatic Sea were Venice, Brindisi, and Pola. The northern Adriatic was under the jurisdiction of the Northern Adriatic Autonomous Naval Command, headquartered in Venice and commanded by Vice Admiral Ferdinando of Savoy (replaced by Admiral Emilio Brenta shortly before the armistice with the Allies); the southern Adriatic was under the jurisdiction of the Southern Adriatic Naval Command, headquartered in Brindisi and commanded by Admiral Luigi Spalice. Vice Admiral Vittorio Tur was the naval commander of Albania, with headquarters in Durrës. Naval commands also existed in Pola (home of the Italian Navy's submarine school) and Lussino.

Italian naval forces in the Adriatic, at the outbreak of the war, included the destroyers Carlo Mirabello and Augusto Riboty and the 7th Torpedo Boat Squadron (Angelo Bassini, Nicola Fabrizi, Enrico Cosenz and Giacomo Medici) in Brindisi, the 15th Torpedo Boat Squadron (Palestro, Confienza, San Martino and Solferino) in Venice, the gunboat Ernesto Giovannini in Pola, the 2nd MAS Squadron (four boats) in Pola, the 3rd MAS Squadron (two boats) in Brindisi, and several minelayers (the relatively shallow waters of the Adriatic Sea were particularly favourable for mine warfare). Seven submarines were based in Brindisi: Balilla, Domenico Millelire, Enrico Toti, and Antonio Sciesa (belonging to the 40th Submarine Squadron), Brin (of the 42nd Squadron), Anfitrite (44th Squadron) and Ondina (48th Squadron).

== Greco-Italian War ==
The Greco-Italian War lasted from 28 October 1940 to 30 April 1941 and was part of World War II. Italian forces invaded Greece and made limited gains. At the outbreak of hostilities, the Royal Hellenic Navy was composed of the old cruiser Georgios Averof, 10 destroyers (four old Thiria class, four relatively modern Dardo class and two new Greyhound class), several torpedo boats and six old submarines. Faced with the formidable Regia Marina, its role was primarily limited to patrol and convoy escort duties in the Aegean Sea. This was essential both for the completion of the Army's mobilization and the overall resupply of the country, the convoy routes being threatened by Italian aircraft and submarines operating from the Dodecanese Islands. Nevertheless, the Greek ships also carried out limited offensive operations against Italian shipping in the Strait of Otranto.

On the Italian side, convoy operations between Italy and Albania were under the responsibility of the High Command for Traffic with Albania (Comando Superiore Traffico Albania, Maritrafalba), established in Valona on 5 October 1940 and initially held by Captain Romolo Polacchini. Maritrafalba's forces included two elderly Mirabello-class destroyers, eleven equally old torpedo boats (belonging to the Palestro, Curtatone, Sirtori, Generali and La Masa classes), four more modern Spica-class torpedo boats of the 12th Torpedo Boat Squadron, four auxiliary cruisers and four MAS of the 13th MAS Squadron. The main Italian supply routes were from Brindisi to Valona and from Bari to Durrës.

Greek destroyers carried out three bold but fruitless night-time raids (14–15 November 1940, 15–16 December 1940 and 4–5 January 1941). The main Greek successes came from the submarines, which managed to sink some Italian transports (Greeks also lost a submarine in the process), but the Greek submarine force was too small to be able to seriously hinder the supply lines between Italy and Albania; between 28 October 1940 and 30 April 1941 Italian ships made 3,305 voyages across the Otranto straits, carrying 487,089 military personnel (including 22 field divisions) and 584,392 tons of supplies while losing overall only seven merchant ships and one escort ship. Although the Regia Marina suffered severe losses in capital ships from the British Royal Navy during the Taranto raid, Italian cruisers and destroyers continued to operate covering the convoys between Italy and Albania. Also, on 28 November, an Italian squadron bombarded Corfu, while on 18 December and 4 March, Italian naval units shelled Greek coastal positions in Albania.

The only surface engagement between the Regia Marina and the Royal Navy occurred on the night of 11–12 November 1940, when a British squadron of three light cruisers and two destroyers attacked an Italian return convoy consisting of four merchant ships escorted by the auxiliary cruiser Ramb III and the torpedo boat Nicola Fabrizi, in the Battle of the Strait of Otranto. All four merchants were sunk, and Nicola Fabrizi was heavily damaged. In March 1941, Fairey Swordfish torpedo bombers of the Fleet Air Arm, based in Paramythia, Greece, raided the harbour of Valona multiple times, sinking one merchant ship, one torpedo boat and the hospital ship Po; the Regia Aeronautica then discovered the air base and bombed it, knocking it out for some weeks. In April the air field became operational again and another raid on Valona was carried out, sinking two additional merchant ships; on the same day, however, German forces launched their invasion of Greece, and the base at Paramythia was bombed by the Luftwaffe and permanently destroyed.

== Invasion of Yugoslavia ==
The Invasion of Yugoslavia (also known as Operation 25) began on 6 April 1941 and ended with the unconditional surrender of the Royal Yugoslav Army on 17 April. The invading Axis powers (Nazi Germany, Fascist Italy and Hungary) occupied and dismembered the Kingdom of Yugoslavia.

When Germany and Italy attacked Yugoslavia on 6 April 1941, the Yugoslav Royal Navy had available three destroyers, two submarines and 10 MTBs as the most effective units of the fleet. One other destroyer, the Ljubljana, was in dry-dock at the time of the invasion and she and her anti-aircraft guns were used in defence of the fleet base at Kotor. The remainder of the fleet was useful only for coastal defence and local escort and patrol work.

Kotor (Cattaro) was close to the Albanian border and the Italo-Greek front there, but Zara (Zadar), an Italian enclave, was to the north-west of the coast, and to prevent a bridgehead being established, the Beograd, four of the old torpedo boats and six MTBs were despatched to Šibenik, 80 km to the south of Zara, in preparation for an attack. The attack was to be co-ordinated with the 12th "Jadranska" Infantry Division and two Odred (combined regiments) of the Royal Yugoslav Army attacking from the Benkovac area, supported by air attacks by the 81st Bomber Group of the Royal Yugoslav Air Force.

The Yugoslav forces launched their attack on 9 April, but by 13 April Italian forces under General Vittorio Ambrosio had counter-attacked, and were in Benkovac by 14 April. The naval prong of the attack faltered when Beograd was damaged by near misses from Italian aircraft off Šibenik. With her starboard engine put out of action, she limped to Kotor, escorted by the remainder of the force, for repair. Italian air raids on Kotor badly damaged the minelayer Kobac, which was beached to prevent sinking.

The maritime patrol float-planes of the Royal Yugoslav Air Force flew reconnaissance and attack missions during the campaign, as well as providing air cover for mine-laying operations off Zara. Their operations included attacks on the Albanian port of Durrës, as well as strikes against Italian re-supply convoys to Albania. On 9 April, one Dornier Do 22K floatplane notably took on an Italian convoy of 12 steamers with an escort of eight destroyers crossing the Adriatic during the day, attacking single-handed in the face of intense AA fire. No Italian ships, however, were sunk by Yugoslav forces; an Italian tanker was claimed damaged by a near miss off the Italian coast near Bari. Most of the small Yugoslav fleet (the old cruiser Dalmacija, three destroyers, six torpedo boats, three submarines, eleven minelayers, and several auxiliary ships) was seized by Italian ground forces in its bases at Split and Kotor, and later recommissioned under Italian flag. Only four Yugoslav ships escaped capture: the submarine Nebojsa and two motor torpedo boats sailed to Allied-controlled ports, while the Zagreb was scuttled to prevent capture.

== Italian occupation and Yugoslav resistance ==
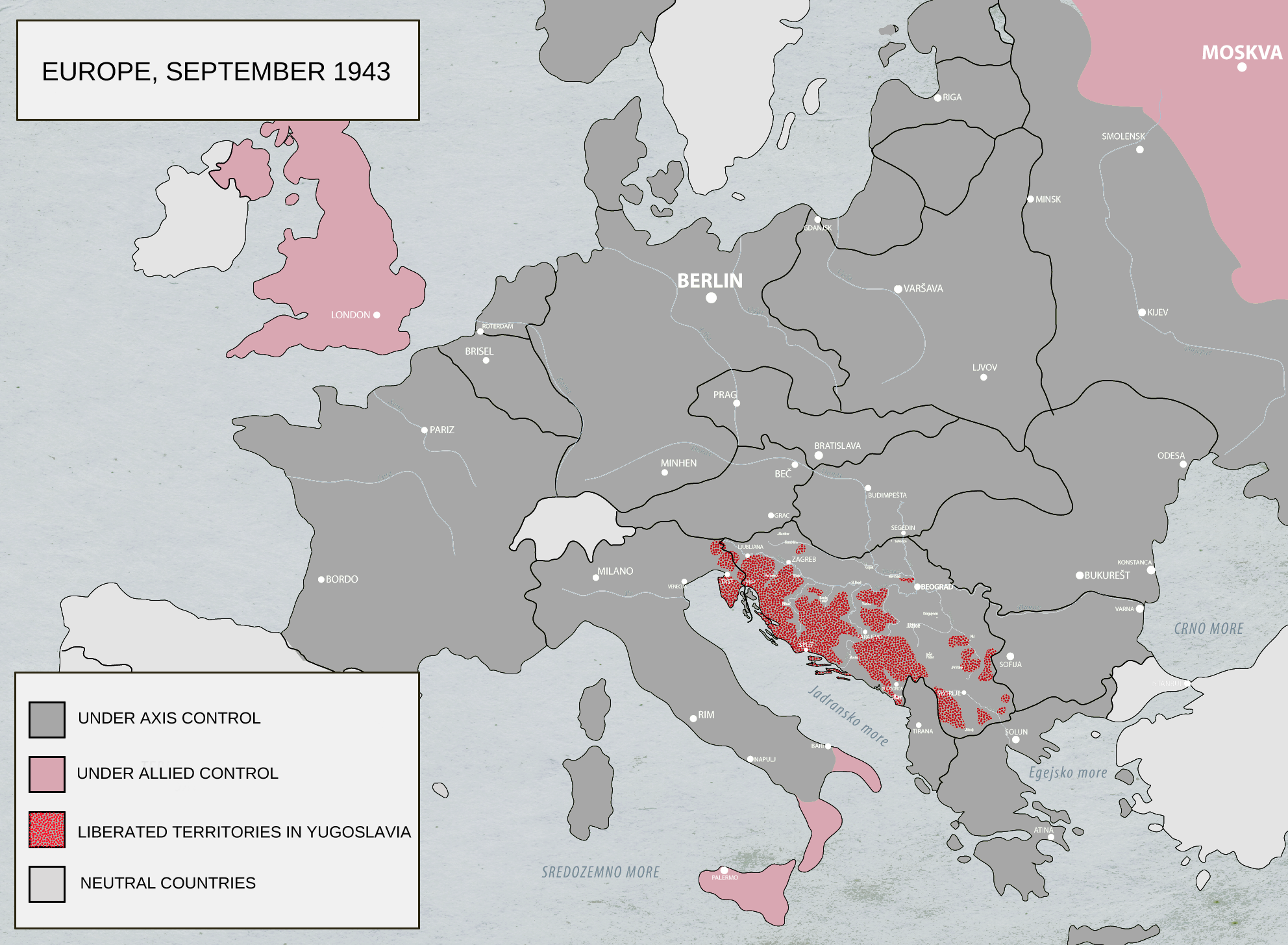
Capitulation of Italy and uprising in occupied Yugoslavia 1943

After the invasion, Italy controlled the entire eastern Adriatic coast through the annexation of much of Dalmatia, the Italian occupation zone of the Independent State of Croatia, the Italian governorate of Montenegro, and the Italian puppet regime of the Albanian Kingdom (1939–1943).

Naval forces of the Yugoslav Partisans were formed as early as 19 September 1942, when Partisans in Dalmatia formed their first naval unit made of fishing boats, which gradually evolved (especially after the armistice between Italy and the Allies) into a force able to conduct complex amphibious operations. This event is considered to be the foundation of the Yugoslav Navy. At its peak during World War II, the Yugoslav Partisans' Navy commanded nine or 10 armed ships, 30 patrol boats, close to 200 support ships, six coastal batteries, and several Partisan detachments on the islands, around 3,000 men.

After the Italian capitulation of 8 September 1943, following the Allied invasion of Italy, the Partisans took most of the coast and all of the islands. On 26 October, the Yugoslav Partisans' Navy was organized first into four, and later into six Maritime Coastal Sectors (Pomorsko Obalni Sektor, POS). The task of the naval forces was to secure supremacy at sea, organize defense of coast and islands, and attack enemy sea traffic and forces on the islands and along the coasts.

=== British submarine activity ===
After the fall of Greece and Yugoslavia, the complete Italian control of both coasts of the Adriatic, and the distance from British naval and air bases, meant the end of all British air and surface operations in the Adriatic Sea. From the spring of 1941 to September 1943, Royal Navy activity in the Adriatic was thus limited to submarine operations, mainly in the Southern Adriatic; Italian convoys across the Adriatic suffered negligible losses. Between June 1940 and September 1943, only 0,6 % of the personnel and 0,3 % of the supplies shipped from Italy to Albania and Greece were lost; two-thirds of these losses were caused by submarines, mostly British. Four Royal Navy submarines were lost in the Adriatic, most likely to mines. British surface ships re-entered the Adriatic after the September 1943 armistice, when the much weaker Kriegsmarine forces remained the only opponent.

== German occupation ==
As a first move (Operation Wolkenbruch) the Germans rushed to occupy the northern Adriatic ports of Trieste, Rijeka and Pula, and established the Operational Zone Adriatic Coast (OZAK), with its headquarters in Trieste, on 10 September. It comprised the provinces of Udine, Gorizia, Trieste, Pula (Pola), Rijeka (Fiume) and Ljubljana (Lubiana). Since an Allied landing in the area was anticipated, OZAK also hosted a substantial German military contingent, the Befehlshaber Operationszone Adriatisches Küstenland commanded by General der Gebirgstruppe Ludwig Kübler. On 28 September 1944, these units were redesignated XCVII Armeekorps. Soon, German marine units were also formed. Royal Navy engagement was also on the rise.

=== German navy in the Adriatic ===
Vizeadmiral Joachim Lietzmann was Germany's Commanding Admiral Adriatic (Kommandierender Admiral Adria). Initially, the area of operation ranged from Fiume to Valona, and the area of the Western coast was under the jurisdiction of the German navy for Italy (Deutsches Marinekommando Italien). The line of demarcation between the two naval commands corresponded with the line between Armed Group F (Balkans) and Armed Group E (Italy), acting as the border between the Italian Social Republic (RSI) and the Independent State of Croatia (NDH). Soon, at Lietzmann's insistence, the area of operation was extended to include the whole of Istria to the mouth of the Tagliamento, correspondence with the boundary line between the Italian Social Republic and the area of the Operational Zone Adriatic Coast (OZAK).

One of the first operations was Operation Herbstgewitter. This consisted of landing German troops on the islands of Krk, Cres, and Lošinj in November 1943. The Germans used some old ships such as the cruiser SMS Niobe and the auxiliary cruiser Ramb III. During the action, the islands were cleared of partisan forces and Niobe with two S-boats managed to capture a British military mission on the island of Lošinj.

Gradually the German navy was built up, mostly with former Italian ships found in an advanced phase of construction in the yards of Fiume and Trieste. The strongest naval unit was the 11th Sicherungsflotille. Formed in May 1943 in Trieste as the 11. Küstenschutzflottille, in December 1943 it was designated 11. Sicherungsflottille. It was employed in protecting marine communications in the Adriatic, mostly from partisan naval attacks. On 1 March 1944, the Flotilla was extended and re-designated the 11. Sicherungsdivision.

=== Occupation of Dalmatia ===
Until the end of 1943, German forces were advancing into Dalmatia after the capitulation of Italy.

Starting in late 1943, the Allies undertook a major evacuation of civilian population from Dalmatia fleeing the German occupation, and in 1944 moved them to the El Shatt refugee camp in Egypt.

=== Vis island ===
By 1944, only the island of Vis remained unoccupied by the Germans, and Yugoslav and British troops were tasked with preparing its defenses against the later cancelled German invasion (Operation Freischütz). The island was about 14 mi (12 nmi; 23 km) long and 8 mi (7.0 nmi; 13 km) wide, with a mainly hilly outline, and a plain in the centre covered with vines, part of which had been removed to make way for an airstrip about 750 yd (690 m) long, from which four Spitfires of the Balkan Air Force were operating. At the west end of the island was the Port of Komiža while at the other end was the Port of Vis; these were connected by the only good road running across the plain. Vis was organized as a great stronghold, held until the end of World War II.

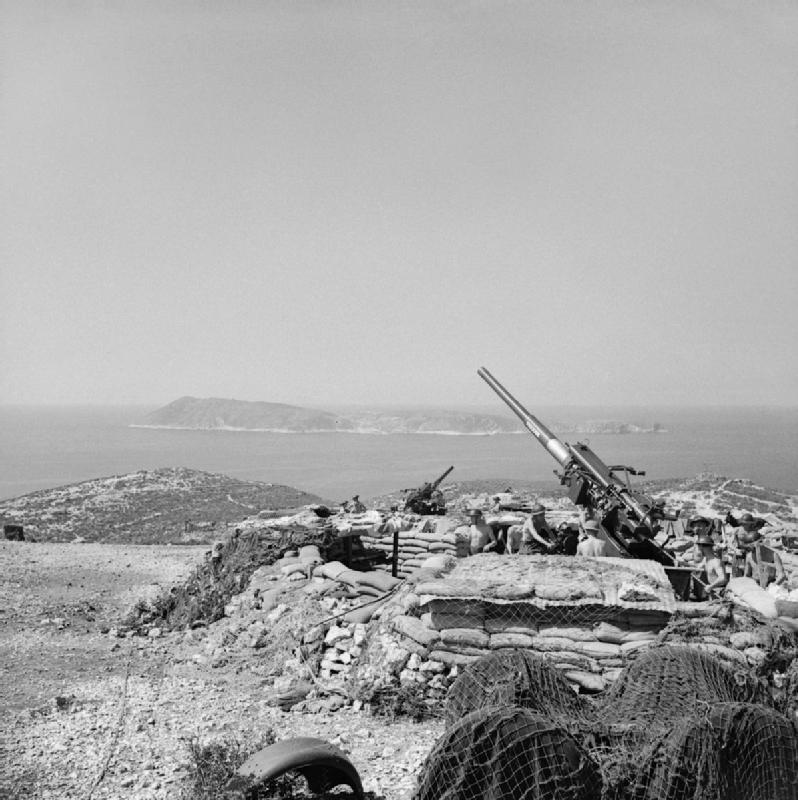
3.7-inch guns of British 64th Heavy Anti-Aircraft Regiment on the island of Vis off the coast of Yugoslavia, August 1944

In 1944 Tito's headquarters moved there, and eventually over 1,000 British troops were included in the defence of Vis. British forces on the island were called Land Forces Adriatic, and were under the command of Brigadier George Daly. The force consisted of No. 40 and No. 43 (Royal Marine) Commando of the 2nd Special Service Brigade, the 2nd Bn. The Highland Light Infantry, and other support troops. Operating from the two ports were several Royal Navy craft. Marshal Tito's forces numbered about 2,000. Vis was functioning as the political and military center of the liberated territories, until the liberation of Belgrade late in 1944.

A remarkable figure was the Canadian captain Thomas G. Fuller, son of the Canadian Chief Dominion Architect Thomas William Fuller, who in 1944 took command of the 61st MGB flotilla . Operating from Vis, he supplied the partisans by pirating German supply ships. He managed to sink or capture 13 German supply boats, was involved in 105 fire fights and another 30 operations where there was no gunfire. Characteristically for the Yugoslav operations theatre, Fuller attributed a good part of his success to the blood-curdling threats uttered by the Yugoslav partisan who manned the MGB's loud hailer: a 400-ton schooner was captured with its whole cargo and whose crew gave up without a struggle because of the explanation of what would be done to them personally, with knives, if they disobeyed.

=== Liberation of Dalmatia ===
British naval forces in the Middle East operating in the Adriatic Sea were under the command of the Flag Officer Taranto and Adriatic & Liaison with the Italians (F.O.T.A.L.I). All the naval forces were controlled from Taranto and operated in close coordination with the Coastal attack operations conducted by the BAF. The Yugoslavs used the units in the British navy to transport materials and men, but especially to make landings on the islands of Dalmatia to liberate them from German occupation.

During the Vis period, Partisans carried out several seaborne landings on Dalmatian islands with help of Royal Navy and commandos:

- Korčula
- Šolta – Operation Detained
- Hvar – Operation Endowment
- Mljet – Operation Farrier
- Brač – Operation Flounced

The French Navy was involved as well in the first half of 1944, with the 10th Division of Light Cruisers made up of three Le Fantasque-class destroyers (Le Fantasque, Le Terrible, Le Malin) making high speed sweeps in the Adriatic, destroying German convoys. One notable action was the Battle off Ist on 29 February 1944 where a German convoy force of two corvettes and two torpedo boats escorting a freighter supported by three minesweepers. The French managed to destroy the German freighter and a corvette in return for no loss before withdrawing.

In the second half of 1944 the Royal Navy sent a destroyer flotilla into the Adriatic. The biggest engagement happened on 1 November, when two Hunt-class destroyers HMS Avon Vale and Wheatland were patrolling the coastal shipping routes south of Lussino. That evening, two enemy corvettes (UJ-202 and UJ-208) were sighted. The two destroyers opened fire at a range of 4,000 yd (3,700 m). In less than 10 minutes, the enemy ships were reduced to mere scrap, the two British ships were circling the enemy and pouring out a devastating fire of pom-pom and small calibre gunfire. When the first corvette was sunk Avon Vale closed to rescue the Germans while Wheatland continued to shoot up the second corvette which eventually blew up. Ten minutes later, the British came under fire from the German Torpedoboot Ausland destroyer TA20 (ex-Italian destroyer Audace) which suddenly appeared on the scene. When the two British ships directed their fire at her and the enemy destroyer was sunk. But while the Adriatic campaign continued to the end of the war, the Hunts did not again engage large German warships, although the German navy was constantly launching and commissioning light destroyer types from the yards of Trieste and Fiume. On 14 December, HMS Aldenham became the last British destroyer lost in World Warr II when struck a mine around the island of Škrda.

To prevent entrance to the North Adriatic in the last two years of World War II, Germany spread thousands of mines and blocked all ports and canals. Many underwater mine fields were situated in the open sea. Mine sweeping was executed by British ships equipped with special mine-sweeping technology. On 5 May 1945, the Shakespeare-class trawler HMS Coriolanus hit a mine while it was sweeping the sea in front of Novigrad.

== Planned Allied landings ==
The Allies, first under a French initiative of general Maxime Weygand, planned landings in the Thessaloniki area. Although discarded by the British, later Winston Churchill advocated for such a landing option. The so-called Ljubljana gap strategy proved ultimately to be little more than a bluff owing to American refusal and skepticism about the whole operation. Nevertheless, the British command planned several landing operations in Dalmatia and Istria codenamed ARMPIT and a more ambitious plan, GELIGNITE. Facing American opposition, the British-made attempts were marked by sending an air force called FAIRFAX to the Zadar area, and an artillery attachment called FLOYD FORCE also to Dalmatia, but due to Yugoslav obstruction, such attempts ceased. Nevertheless, the bluff worked since Hitler eventually awaited an allied landing in the northern Adriatic, and diverted important resources to the area. Instead of landings, the allied agreed to provide Tito's land units with aerial and logistical support by setting up the Balkan Air Force.

The biggest British-led combined operation in the eastern Adriatic codenamed Operation Antagonise in December 1944 was intended to capture the island of Lošinj, where the Germans kept E-boats and (possibly) midget submarines. It was only partially executed since the partisan Navy Commander in Chief, Josip Černi, refused to give his troops for the landing operation. Instead, a group of destroyers and MTBs shelled the German gun positions and 36 South African Air Force Bristol Beaufighters attacked the naval base installations with RP-3 3 in (76 mm) Rocket Projectiles. As the attacks proved ineffective in stopping German activities they were repeated also in the first months of 1945.

== Final naval operations ==
By the end of October 1944, the Germans still had five TA torpedo boats (TA20, TA40, TA41, TA44 and TA45) and three corvettes (UJ205, UJ206 and TA48) on the Adriatic. On 1 January 1945, there were four German destroyers operative in the northern Adriatic (TA40, TA41, TA44, and TA45) and three U-Boot Jäger corvettes (UJ205, UJ206, and TA48). Even as late as 1 April TA43, TA45 and UJ206 were in commission and available to fight. Allied aircraft sank four in port (at Fiume and Trieste) in March and April, British MTB torpedoed TA45 in April.

The very last operations of the German navy involved the evacuation of troops and personnel from Istria and Trieste before the advancing Yugoslavs that took place in May 1945. An estimated enemy force of 4,000 was landing from 26 ships of all types at the mouth of the Tagliamento River at Lignano Sabbiadoro. The area is a huge sand spit running out into a big lagoon, and at its southern end the Tagliamento River enters the sea. The Germans had evacuated Trieste to escape the Yugoslav Army. The Germans were protected by naval craft holding off three British MTBs, which could not get in close enough to use their guns effectively. There were about 6,000 of them and their equipment included E-boats, LSTs, a small hospital ship, all types of transport, and a variety of weapons. The 21st Battalion of the New Zealand 2nd Division was outnumbered by 20 to one, but at the end the Germans surrendered on 4 May 1945. Others had already surrendered to the British troops on German ships which arrived from Istria to Ancona on 2 May. British sources wrote there were about 30 boats, but no exact record is mentioned.
