= Morgan Morgan-Giles =

Royal Navy Rear-Admiral (1914–2013)

Rear-Admiral Sir Morgan Morgan-Giles DSO OBE GM DL
- Born: 19 June 1914; Newton Abbot, Devon, England
- Died: 4 May 2013 (aged 98); Bristol, England
- Military career
- Allegiance: United Kingdom
- Branch: British Navy
- Service years: 1933–1964
- Rank: Rear-Admiral
- Commands: Royal Naval College, Greenwich; HMS Belfast; Royal Navy Torpedo School; Dartmouth Training Squadron; HMS Chieftain
- Conflicts: Second World War; Norwegian campaign; Siege of Tobruk; Action of 1 November 1944
- Awards: Knight Bachelor; Distinguished Service Order; Officer of the Order of the British Empire; George Medal; Mentioned in Despatches (4)

Rear-Admiral Sir Morgan Charles Morgan-Giles, DSO, OBE, GM, DL (19 June 1914 – 4 May 2013) was a Royal Navy officer, decorated during the Second World War, who later served as a Conservative Member of Parliament. At the time of his death, he was the oldest living former member of the House of Commons.

== Early life ==
The eldest son of Francis Charles Morgan-Giles OBE, Naval architect and yacht designer, and Ivy Constance Morgan-Giles (née Carus-Wilson), Morgan-Giles' childhood was spent idyllically "messing around with boats" at Teignmouth, where his father had his boatyard. The family lived across the river at Shaldon, necessitating a short row across the Teign River several times a day. Morgan-Giles said that he could "row before he could walk".

Morgan-Giles' first memory was of his father (on sick leave from the Royal Navy with petrol poisoning during the First World War) building a little dinghy for his young son. Due to the war, there was a shortage of good wood, and legend has it that FC Morgan Giles could not find quite what he wanted to finish her off. His wife came home one day to find the best table in the house had mysteriously vanished but the little boat had a new mahogany transom. When the boat was completed (she was called Pip Emma and is now in the National Maritime Museum Cornwall in Falmouth) the three-year-old Morgan was placed in her and launched out to sea. This started off his lifelong passion for boats and the sea.

As a child Morgan-Giles' family would spend their Easter holidays at Swallerton Gate on Dartmoor. In 1928, when he was 14 he managed to save enough pocket money to buy a Douglas flat-twin motorbike for £2, which was also 14 years old. In addition to this form of transport, he was lent a little motor boat, one of the first in-board motor boats, originally designed and built by his father, called Shush (also in the National Maritime Museum Cornwall) in which he spent nearly every waking hour, buzzing about on the river. His father built a succession of sailing boats for Morgan, and his brothers and sister, to race, which they did with great success at regattas up and down the coast of Devon and Cornwall.

Morgan-Giles was educated at Clifton College. At Clifton he demonstrated his ability to work the system as he wanted to crew for his father in a sailing race, but was told that instead he must attend a cricket match between Clifton College and Tonbridge School. So he took the train to London, passed through the turnstile at Lord's Cricket Ground; straight in, round and out again, and took the train down to Ryde, on the Isle of Wight, where father and son entered the race, and won; this was the Prince of Wales Cup, one of the most prestigious National dinghy races of the year.

== Early naval career ==
Morgan-Giles joined the China Fleet as a midshipman at 18 in 1932, serving on a variety of ships, including Yangtze river patrol boats. He first sailed in the training cruiser HMS Frobisher to the West Indies and the Baltic. He was then appointed to the Australian destroyer HMAS Voyager before serving in HMS Cumberland, Suffolk and Cornwall on the China Station before returning home to join the torpedo school at HMS Vernon. He was promoted to Torpedo Specialist in 1938.

== Second World War ==
During the Second World War, Morgan-Giles served on HMS Arethusa during the Norwegian Campaign in 1940, HMS Emerald escorting Atlantic convoys, and took part in the Battle of Oran. In 1941, he was sent to the Suez Canal, where he was in charge of the anti-magnetic mine campaign. In April of that year, he acted as a liaison with the Royal Air Force using Wellington bombers as torpedo bombers. During his time with No. 201 Group RAF at Dekheila he survived three serious aeroplane crashes (one of which he was the sole survivor). Following a period of staff training at the Royal Naval College, Greenwich, Morgan-Giles was then sent to the Far East as Staff Officer Operations of Force W. There he accepted the Japanese surrender of Thailand.

=== George Medal ===
Morgan-Giles was awarded the George Medal for "gallantry and undaunted devotion to duty" during bomb and mine disposal work while serving at HMS Nile, the naval base at Ras el-Tin Point, Alexandria. Morgan-Giles had been sent to help clear the ships from the harbour as quickly as possible, because they were loaded with explosive and ammunition, and (although unknown at the time) mustard gas. Whilst on board HMS Zetland, helping to get move the ship out of the harbour to minimise losses, a bomb struck a nearby ammunition ship, and he was hurled the length of the deck, but was uninjured amongst the wreckage and fire. He was nevertheless able to climb onto an American Liberty ship, SS Lyman Abbott that was blocking the harbour exit. Once aboard, he found not a single man alive, and no power, therefore no method of weighing her anchor. He, and two other men that had joined him, were therefore forced to tamp explosive into the anchor chain, light the fuse and take cover. The explosion severed the cable, and they eventually managed to get the ship towed out of the way. It emerged after the war that Lyman Abbott had also had mustard gas on board. Had Lyman Abbott been hit whilst still inside Bari's harbour, the casualties from the mustard gas would likely have been extensive.

=== Siege of Tobruk ===
Morgan-Giles later served with the Tobruk Garrison, in Tobruk during the Siege of Tobruk, where he 'swam' a mine out of the harbour, before being made the liaison officer in Le Fantasque, and after that the Italian destroyer Legionario. As an Acting Lieutenant Commander, he joined Sir Fitzroy Maclean's mission to Yugoslavia in October 1943, at his particular request. Initially the Admiralty wanted to send him elsewhere, so Fitzroy had to appeal to the top..."you said I could have anyone I want for this mission", he asked Winston Churchill, "and I want Morgan Giles". The prime minister agreed, over-ruled the Second Sea Lord, and Morgan joined Fitzroy in Cairo, and was promoted to Acting Lieutenant-Commander. Morgan-Giles became the Senior Naval Officer, based in Vis, in charge of running boats with guns and supplies across the Adriatic from Italy to the Dalmatian Islands in support of Tito's partisans. While aboard Wheatland, he commanded a Royal Navy force off the Kvarner Gulf Pag Island in Action of 1 November 1944 against the Kriegsmarine.

== Post-war ==
From 1945 to 1948 Morgan-Giles served in Ceylon, Cape Town, England, and Trieste. In 1950 he became the Captain of HMS Chieftain, then stationed in Malta. In 1953, he was promoted to Chief of Naval Intelligence, Far East. He became Captain (D) of the Dartmouth Training Squadron in 1957, then moved to HMS Vernon Torpedo School in 1958. He took command as Captain of HMS Belfast, then Flagship of the Far East Fleet, in 1961. He was promoted to rear admiral in 1963, the same year he became President of Royal Naval College, Greenwich. He left the Royal Navy in January 1964 to stand for Parliament.

== Parliamentary career ==
Retiring from the Royal Navy in January 1964, Morgan-Giles stood for Parliament for the Conservative Party in his local constituency of Winchester at a by-election following the resignation of Peter Smithers (who had been appointed to the Council of Europe) and was elected a Member of Parliament on 14 May 1964. He is known to have regarded being an MP as a retirement occupation. His House of Commons speeches were often greeted by affectionate Labour Party cries of "Send a gunboat" because of the impression that he gave of steaming into action with all guns blazing on behalf of his constituency and also in loyal protection of any perceived threat to the Services.

Charles Moore writing in The Spectator regarded his Pro bono publico. No bloody panico utterance to stop a row over Europe as his best contribution to Parliament – a sentence also used by Norman Tebbit about the in-fighting in the Conservative party during the 2016 United Kingdom European Union membership referendum.

Once, while still in hospital after a riding accident, Morgan-Giles wrote to James Callaghan, the then prime minister, of "the cold, silent, teeth-clenched fury" among servicemen about a pay review board, which "did not seem to know, in blunt nautical language, whether it's on its arse or elbow". He complained that Wrens only received threepence extra a day after four years' good service: "That is not much to give a girl for saying 'Yes, Sir' all day and then 'No, Sir' all night." Yet he opposed Wrens serving on warships because: "woman's eternal role is to create life and nurture it; a fighting man must be prepared to kill. Women do wonderful things for men but combat duty to defend us should not be one of them. Vive la difference." He served in the House of Commons until 1979, when he stood down and was succeeded by John Browne.

== Other interests ==
In 1971, hearing that his beloved HMS Belfast was due to be scrapped, Morgan-Giles started "Operation Sea Horse", which had the object of forming the "HMS Belfast Trust", and saving the Belfast by transforming her into a museum. The Belfast became part of the Imperial War Museum in 1978. Morgan-Giles was Prime Warden of the Worshipful Company of Shipwrights 1987–88. He had farming interests in Hampshire and New South Wales.

== Awards and honours ==
Morgan-Giles was Mentioned in Despatches once in 1942, twice in 1944, and once more in 1945. He received the George Medal in 1941, was appointed a Member of the Order of the British Empire in 1944 and advanced to an Officer of the Order of the British Empire in 1944, and was awarded a Distinguished Service Order in 1945. Morgan-Giles was appointed a Knight Bachelor in the 1985 New Year Honours List for political services, and was made Deputy Lieutenant of Hampshire in 1983. He also was awarded the Order of the Partisan Star (Yugoslavia) by Josip Broz Tito.

== Family life ==
Morgan-Giles married twice (both wives predeceasing him) and had six children by his first wife, Pamela Bushell, daughter of P.H. Bushell of Darling Point, Sydney, whom he married in 1946. He married secondly in 1968 Marigold Katherine Steel, daughter of Dr Percy Lowe OBE, a British scientist, and his wife the former Dorothy Mead-Waldo. He wrote an autobiography entitled The Unforgiving Minute.

His son, Rodney Charles Howard Morgan-Giles, married Sarah Jennifer, third daughter of Sir Hereward Wake, 14th Baronet; they have four sons and a daughter. Morgan-Giles's second daughter, Melita, married Victor Lampson, the third Baron Killearn. Morgan-Giles died aged 98 on 4 May 2013.

== See also ==
- Barons Killearn
- Wake baronets
- Bolitho family

Military offices
Preceded by Sir Alexander Gordon-Lennox	President, Royal Naval College, Greenwich; 1962–1964	Succeeded by Sir Ian McGeoch
Parliament of the United Kingdom
Preceded by Peter Smithers	Member of Parliament for Winchester; 1964–1979	Succeeded by John Browne
