= Adriatic Campaign =

Adriatic Campaign may refer to:

- Adriatic campaign of 1807–1814, a minor theatre of war during the Napoleonic Wars
- Adriatic Campaign of World War I, a naval campaign fought during World War I between the Central Powers and the Mediterranean squadrons of the Allies
- Adriatic Campaign of World War II, a minor naval campaign fought during World War II between the Allies and the Axis
