= German submarine U-652 =

German World War II submarine

History

Nazi Germany
- Name: U-652
- Ordered: 9 October 1939
- Builder: Howaldtswerke, Hamburg
- Yard number: 801
- Laid down: 5 February 1940
- Launched: 7 February 1941
- Commissioned: 3 April 1941
- Fate: Scuttled on 2 June 1942

General characteristics
- Class & type: Type VIIC submarine
- Displacement: 769 tonnes (757 long tons) surfaced; 871 t (857 long tons) submerged
- Length: 67.10 m (220 ft 2 in) o/a; 50.50 m (165 ft 8 in) pressure hull
- Beam: 6.20 m (20 ft 4 in) o/a; 4.70 m (15 ft 5 in) pressure hull
- Height: 9.60 m (31 ft 6 in)
- Draught: 4.74 m (15 ft 7 in)
- Installed power: 2,800–3,200 PS (2,100–2,400 kW; 2,800–3,200 bhp) (diesels); 750 PS (550 kW; 740 shp) (electric)
- Propulsion: 2 shafts; 2 × diesel engines; 2 × electric motors.
- Speed: 17.7 knots (32.8 km/h; 20.4 mph) surfaced; 7.6 knots (14.1 km/h; 8.7 mph) submerged
- Range: 8,500 nmi (15,700 km; 9,800 mi) at 10 knots (19 km/h; 12 mph) surfaced; 80 nmi (150 km; 92 mi) at 4 knots (7.4 km/h; 4.6 mph) submerged
- Test depth: 230 m (750 ft); Crush depth: 250–295 m (820–968 ft)
- Complement: 4 officers, 40–56 enlisted
- Armament: 5 × 53.3 cm (21 in) torpedo tubes (four bow, one stern); 14 × torpedoes or 26 TMA mines; 1 × 8.8 cm (3.46 in) deck gun (220 rounds); 1 x 2 cm (0.79 in) C/30 AA gun

Service record
- Part of: 3rd U-boat Flotilla; 3 April – 31 December 1941; 29th U-boat Flotilla; 1 January – 2 June 1942
- Identification codes: M 42 644
- Commanders: Oblt.z.S. Georg-Werner Fraatz; 3 April 1941 – 2 June 1942
- Operations: 9 patrols: 1st patrol: a. 23 July – 7 August 1941; b. 9 – 13 August 1941; 2nd patrol: 23 August – 18 September 1941; 3rd patrol: 1 November – 12 December 1941; 4th patrol: 14 December 1941 – 1 January 1942; 5th patrol: 5 – 16 February 1942; 6th patrol: 21 February – 1 March 1942; 7th patrol: 12 – 14 March 1942; 8th patrol: 18 – 31 March 1942; 9th patrol: 25 May – 2 June 1942
- Victories: 3 merchant ships sunk (10,775 GRT); 2 warships sunk (2,740 tons); 1 auxiliary warship sunk (558 GRT); 2 merchant ships damaged (9,918 GRT); 1 auxiliary warship damaged (10,917 GRT)

German submarine U-652 was a Type VIIC U-boat of Nazi Germany's Kriegsmarine during World War II. The submarine was laid down on 5 February 1940 at the Howaldtswerke yard at Hamburg, launched on 7 February 1941, and commissioned on 3 April 1941 under the command of Oberleutnant zur See Georg-Werner Fraatz.

Attached to 3rd U-boat Flotilla based at Kiel, U-652 completed her training period on 30 June 1941 and was assigned to front-line service. In September 1941 she was involved in the "Greer Incident", attacking and being counter-attacked by the supposedly neutral American destroyer Greer (DD-145), an incident that brought the United States closer to war with Germany. As a direct result of the Greer incident the US President Franklin D. Roosevelt gave a speech on 11 September 1941 in which he confirmed that all US ships had been ordered to shoot on sight at all Axis ships and submarines in the Battle of the Atlantic. U-652 was transferred to 29th U-boat Flotilla based at La Spezia, Italy on 1 January 1942. She was scuttled on 2 June 1942.

== Design ==
German Type VIIC submarines were preceded by the shorter Type VIIB submarines. U-652 had a displacement of 769 tonnes (757 long tons) when at the surface and 871 tonnes (857 long tons) while submerged. She had a total length of 67.10 m (220 ft 2 in), a pressure hull length of 50.50 m (165 ft 8 in), a beam of 6.20 m (20 ft 4 in), a height of 9.60 m (31 ft 6 in), and a draught of 4.74 m (15 ft 7 in). The submarine was powered by two Germaniawerft F46 four-stroke, six-cylinder supercharged diesel engines producing a total of 2,800 to 3,200 metric horsepower (2,060 to 2,350 kW; 2,760 to 3,160 shp) for use while surfaced, two Siemens-Schuckert GU 343/38–8 double-acting electric motors producing a total of 750 metric horsepower (550 kW; 740 shp) for use while submerged. She had two shafts and two 1.23 m (4 ft) propellers. The boat was capable of operating at depths of up to 230 metres (750 ft).

The submarine had a maximum surface speed of 17.7 knots (32.8 km/h; 20.4 mph) and a maximum submerged speed of 7.6 knots (14.1 km/h; 8.7 mph). When submerged, the boat could operate for 80 nautical miles (150 km; 92 mi) at 4 knots (7.4 km/h; 4.6 mph); when surfaced, she could travel 8,500 nautical miles (15,700 km; 9,800 mi) at 10 knots (19 km/h; 12 mph). U-652 was fitted with five 53.3 cm (21 in) torpedo tubes (four fitted at the bow and one at the stern), fourteen torpedoes, one 8.8 cm (3.46 in) SK C/35 naval gun, 220 rounds, and a 2 cm (0.79 in) C/30 anti-aircraft gun. The boat had a complement of between 44 and 60.

== Service history ==
=== First patrol ===
U-652 left Kiel on 19 June 1941 and sailed to Bökfjord near Kirkenes, via Horten Naval Base and Trondheim, arriving on 22 July. Her first combat patrol began the next day, on 23 July, patrolling the coast of the Kola Peninsula. There on 6 August at 19:00 she torpedoed and sank the 558 GRT Soviet despatch vessel PS-70 seven miles off Cape Teriberka, about 50 kilometres (31 mi) east of Murmansk. The 12 survivors from the crew of 57 were rescued by motorboats sent from the nearby coast. This was the first U-boat success in the Arctic Sea.

The U-boat returned to Kirkenes on 7 August after 16 days at sea, and after two days headed for Trondheim, arriving there on 13 August.

=== Second patrol ===
U-652 sailed from Trondheim on 23 August 1941 and headed out into the Atlantic waters between Greenland and Iceland.

As part of wolfpack Grönland, at 00:44 on 26 August the U-boat fired a spread of three torpedoes at a British naval convoy running south-south-east and observed a hit on the 10,917 GRT auxiliary minelayer HMS Southern Prince, which soon came to a halt. Another torpedo was fired at the vessel at 00:53, but missed. The destroyers HMS Lightning and Lamerton sailed from Scapa Flow to assist the damaged ship and escorted her to The Minches. She was repaired at Belfast.

As part of wolfpack Markgraf, on 10 September at 04:52 U-652 fired two single torpedoes at ships of Convoy SC 42 north-east of Cape Farewell, and damaged two British ships. The 6,508 GRT tanker Tahchee caught fire and was abandoned. The crew later reboarded the vessel and managed to put out the fire. The ship was towed to Reykjavík by HMCS Orillia and after repairs was towed to the Tyne, repaired and returned to service in November 1942. The 3,410 GRT merchant ship Baron Pentland remained afloat due her cargo of timber despite a broken back, but was later torpedoed and sunk by U-372 on 19 September.

==== The Greer incident ====
On 4 September 1941, off Iceland, the American destroyer Greer received a signal from a British bomber that a German submarine was in the vicinity. Greer made sonar contact, and pursued the U-652 at close range. The aircraft dropped four depth charges, and soon after the U-boat fired a torpedo at the US warship, perhaps believing she had launched the attack. Oblt.z.S. Fraatz also misidentified the destroyer as "one of the 50 American vessels that are now sailing for England". A two-hour battle ensued.

U-652 arrived at Lorient, France, on 18 September after 27 days on patrol.

=== Third patrol ===
U-652 left Lorient on 1 November 1941, and headed out into the mid-Atlantic, before sailing through the Strait of Gibraltar into the Mediterranean Sea. There, south of the Balearic Islands, on 9 December she hit the 1,595 GRT Vichy French merchant ship Saint Denis with a single torpedo, which sank her immediately.

U-652 arrived at Messina on 12 December after 42 days at sea.

=== Fourth patrol ===
The U-boat departed Messina on 14 December 1941 and sailed around Greece into the Aegean Sea. There at 21:34 on 19 December she torpedoed the unescorted 6,557 GRT Soviet tanker Varlaam Avanesov, which sank two hours later 2.5 miles off Cape Babakale, Çanakkale Province, Turkey. The survivors abandoned ship in lifeboats, reached the Turkish coast and were later repatriated. The U-boat arrived at La Spezia on 1 January 1942, where she joined 29th U-boat Flotilla.

=== Fifth, sixth and seventh patrols ===
After sailing from La Spezia to Salamis in early February 1942, U-652 carried out two short and uneventful patrols.

=== Eighth patrol ===
Departing Salamis on 18 March 1942 U-652 headed for the coast of North Africa. There on 20 March at 10:54 she fired four torpedoes at the 1,050 tons British Type II Hunt-class destroyer HMS Heythrop about 40 miles north-east of Bardia. One torpedo hit Heythrop, which was taken in tow by HMS Eridge towards Tobruk, but she foundered five hours later.

On 26 March at 02:27 the U-boat fired a spread of four torpedoes at the 1,690 tons British J-class destroyer HMS Jaguar north-east of Sollum. Two of the torpedoes struck the ship in the bows, and she caught fire and sank in a short time. From her complement of 246, only 53 survived.

U-652 arrived at Pola on 31 March 1942.

=== Ninth patrol ===
The U-boat left Pola on 25 May 1942 on her final patrol, and returned to the North African coast. On 2 June 1942 U-652 was severely damaged by depth charges dropped by a British Swordfish torpedo bomber from 815 Naval Air Squadron, and was scuttled in the Gulf of Sollum, in position 31°55′N 25°11′E, by torpedoes from U-81. There were no casualties from her crew of 46.

== Summary of raiding history ==
| Date | Ship Name | Nationality | Tonnage (Note: Merchant ship tonnages are in gross register tons. Military vessels are listed by tons displacement.) | Fate |
|---|---|---|---|---|
| 6 August 1941 | PS-70 | Soviet Navy | 558 | Sunk |
| 26 August 1941 | HMS Southern Prince | Royal Navy | 10,917 | Damaged |
| 10 September 1941 | Tahchee | United Kingdom | 6,508 | Damaged |
| 10 September 1941 | Baron Pentland | United Kingdom | 3,410 | Damaged |
| 9 December 1941 | Saint Denis | Vichy France | 1,595 | Sunk |
| 19 December 1941 | Varlaam Avanesov | Soviet Union | 6,557 | Sunk |
| 20 March 1942 | HMS Heythrop | Royal Navy | 1,050 | Sunk |
| 26 March 1942 | HMS Jaguar | Royal Navy | 1,690 | Sunk |
| 26 March 1942 | Slavol | United Kingdom | 2,623 | Sunk |

== Bibliography ==
- Busch, Rainer; Röll, Hans-Joachim (1999). German U-boat commanders of World War II : a biographical dictionary. Translated by Brooks, Geoffrey. London, Annapolis, Md: Greenhill Books, Naval Institute Press. ISBN 1-55750-186-6.
- Busch, Rainer; Röll, Hans-Joachim (1999). Der U-Boot-Krieg, 1939-1945: Deutsche U-Boot-Verluste von September 1939 bis Mai 1945 [German U-boat losses from September 1939 to May 1945] (in German). Vol. IV. Hamburg, Berlin, Bonn: Mittler. ISBN 3-8132-0514-2.
- Gröner, Eric; Jung, Dieter; Maass, Martin (1991). German Warships 1815-1945: U-boats and Mine Warfare Vessels. Vol. 2. Translated by Thomas, Keith; Magowan, Rachel. London: Conway Maritime Press. ISBN 0-85177-593-4.
