= HMS Eridge (L68) =

Destroyer of the Royal Navy

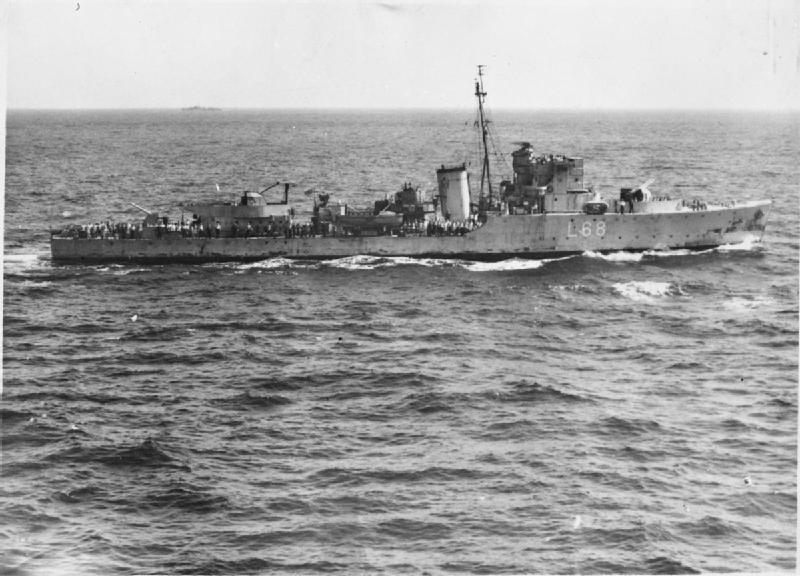
- Eridge in July 1941

History

United Kingdom
- Name: HMS Eridge
- Builder: Swan Hunter, Tyne and Wear
- Laid down: 21 November 1939
- Launched: 20 August 1940
- Commissioned: 28 February 1941
- Reclassified: Base ship on 29 August 1942 (constructive total loss)
- Fate: Sold for scrap, 1946

General characteristics Type II
- Class & type: Hunt-class destroyer
- Displacement: 1,050 long tons (1,070 t) standard; 1,430 long tons (1,450 t) full load
- Length: 85.3 m (279 ft 10 in) o/a
- Beam: 9.6 m (31 ft 6 in)
- Draught: 2.51 m (8 ft 3 in)
- Propulsion: 2 Admiralty 3-drum boilers; 2 shaft Parsons geared turbines, 19,000 shp (14,000 kW)
- Speed: 27 knots (31 mph; 50 km/h); 25.5 kn (29.3 mph; 47.2 km/h) full
- Range: 3,600 nmi (6,700 km) at 14 kn (26 km/h)
- Complement: 164
- Armament: 6 × QF 4 in Mark XVI on twin mounts Mk. XIX; 4 × QF 2 pdr Mk. VIII on quad mount MK.VII; 2 × 20 mm Oerlikons on single mounts P Mk. III; 110 depth charges, 2 throwers, 3 racks

Service record
- Commanders: Lt.Cdr. William Frank Niemann Gregory-Smith

HMS Eridge (L68) was a Type II Hunt-class destroyer of the Royal Navy that served during the Second World War. She was ordered on 4 September 1939 under the 1939 War Emergency Programme and built by Swan Hunter at Wallsend. Eridge was laid down on 21 November 1939, launched on 20 August 1940, and commissioned on 28 February 1941.

Eridge served mainly in the Mediterranean, taking part in several Malta convoys during 1941 and 1942, and helping to sink the German submarine U-568 on 28 May 1942. Eridge was torpedoed off the coast of Egypt by an Italian motor torpedo boat on 29 August 1942, and was damaged beyond repair. The ship was used as an accommodation ship for the rest of the war, before being sold for scrap in October 1946.

== Design and construction ==
The Hunts were meant to fill the Royal Navy's need for a large number of small destroyer-type vessels capable of both convoy escort and operations with the fleet. The Type II Hunts differed from the earlier ships in having increased beam in order to improve stability (Note: A design error caused the first Hunt, Atherstone to be dangerously unstable when built. The first 23 Hunts had a twin 4-inch mount removed, the ships' superstructure cut down and ballast fitted in order to restore adequate stability.) and carry the ships' originally intended armament. Eridge was one of 17 Hunts ordered on 4 September 1939 as part of the 1939 War Emergency Programme.

As a Type II Hunt-class destroyer, Eridge was 264 feet 3 inches (80.54 m) long between perpendiculars and 280 feet (85.34 m) overall. The ship's beam was 31 feet 6 inches (9.60 m) and draught 7 feet 9 inches (2.36 m). Displacement was 1,050 long tons (1,070 t) standard and 1,490 long tons (1,510 t) under full load. Two Admiralty boilers raising steam at 300 pounds per square inch (2,100 kPa) and 620 °F (327 °C) fed Parsons single-reduction geared steam turbines that drove two propeller shafts, generating 19,000 shaft horsepower (14,000 kW) at 380 rpm. This gave a speed of 27 knots (50 km/h; 31 mph).

The ship's main gun armament was six 4 inch (102 mm) QF Mk XVI dual purpose (anti-ship and anti-aircraft) guns in three twin mounts, with one mount forward and two aft. Additional close-in anti-aircraft armament was provided by a quadruple 2-pounder "pom-pom" mount and two single Oerlikon 20 mm cannon mounted in the bridge wings. Power-operated twin 20 mm Oerlikon mounts replaced the single Oerlikons during the war. Up to 110 depth charges could be carried. (Note: While Lenton and Friedman both state a capacity of 110 depth charges, Gardiner and Chesneau give a capacity of 30 or 60 charges.) The ship had a complement of 168 officers and men.

Eridge was laid down by Swan Hunter at Wallsend on 21 November 1939, as Yard number 1581, launched on 20 August 1940, and completed on 28 February 1941, and was the first Type II Hunt to complete. Eridge was named after a Sussex fox hunt, was the second ship of that name to serve with the Royal Navy.

== Service history ==
After working up, Eridge joined the Irish Sea Escort Force, for convoy escort duties. On 1 March 1941, the tanker Atheltemplar was bombed while in a convoy in the North Sea and set on fire. Eridge, together with the minesweeper Speedwell took the stricken tanker back to the Firth of Forth. In May 1941, Eridge was allocated to join the Mediterranean Fleet, and arrived at Gibraltar on 21 June 1941, where she joined the 13th Destroyer Flotilla. In July 1941, Eridge took part in Operation Substance, a convoy to Malta, leaving Gibraltar on 21 July. On 23 July, the destroyer Firedrake was damaged by an Italian bomb, and Eridge was detached from the convoy to tow Firedrake back to Gibraltar, arriving there on 27 July. On 30 July, Eridge left Gibraltar on another Malta Convoy, Operation Style', where the cruisers Arethusa and Hermione and the fast minelayer Manxman carried men and supplies that had been left behind in Gibraltar after the troopship Leinster ran aground during Operation Substance. In August 1941, Eridge left Gibraltar with sister ship Avon Vale on passage to Egypt via the Cape of Good Hope and Indian Ocean, arriving at Suez on 29 September 1941, where she joined the Second Destroyer Flotilla. Early on 21 October 1941, the gunboat Gnat was torpedoed by the German submarine U-79 Eridge was one of four destroyers (Note: Jaguar, Griffin, Eridge and Avon Vale.) that went to Gnat's assistance, with Gnat being towed to Alexandria where she was written off as a constructive total loss. In November 1941, Eridge transferred to the 5th Destroyer Flotilla, based at Alexandria.

On 12 February 1942, Eridge left Alexandria as part of the escort for Convoy MW9, consisting of three merchant ships (Clan Campbell, Clan Chattan and Rowallan Castle) escorted by the cruiser Carlisle and eight destroyers (Note: Eridge, Avon Vale, Beaufort, Dulverton, Heythrop, Hurworth, Southwold and Lance.). The convoy first headed towards Tobruk in an attempt to hide the course of the convoy, reaching the coast of Libya late that day before changing course for Malta. The convoy came under air attack on 13 February, and that evening, Clan Campbell was hit by a bomb and had to turn back for Tobruk, with Eridge and Avon Vale as escorts. The next day, further air attacks damaged Clan Chattan and Rowallan Castle enough that both ships had to be scuttled. The next Malta convoy was MW 10, which left Alexandria on 20 March. The 5th Destroyer Flotilla, including Eridge, set out on an anti submarine sweep ahead of the convoy a few hours earlier. While off Sollum, the German submarine U-652 torpedoed the destroyer HMS Heythrop. Eridge took Heythrop under tow, but after several hours, extensive flooding caused the tow to be abandoned and Heythrop sank. After refuelling at Tobruk, the remaining six ships of the 5th Destroyer Flotilla joined up with the convoy on 21 March. On 22 March, the convoy came under sustained air attack, while surface ships of the Italian Navy also attempted to attack the convoy. While the cruisers and fleet destroyers engaged the Italian force in the Second Battle of Sirte, the convoy, with a close escort of the Hunts, turned away. By the end of the day the convoy remained intact. The delays caused by steering away from the Italian surface forces meant that the convoy could not reach Malta under cover of darkness, and it was decided to disperse it, with each merchant ship making its best speed towards Malta, with the escorts spilt between them. Eridge escorted Clan Campbell, the slowest ship of the convoy, which was bombed and sunk on the morning of 23 March, about 20 nmi (23 mi; 37 km) from Malta. Eridge rescued 112 survivors from Clan Campbell. Two of the four merchant ships made it into Malta but were sunk by air attacks on 26 March, with little of their cargo unloaded. Eridge left Malta on 25 March, and arrived at Alexandria on 27 March 1942.

On 27 May 1942, a Bristol Blenheim bomber of 203 Squadron RAF spotted the German submarine U-568 about 60 nmi (69 mi; 110 km) north of Bardia and attacked with bombs, damaging a fuel tank, and called for assistance, with the destroyers Hero and Hurworth detached from a nearby convoy to hunt the submarine. The two destroyers carried out several depth charge attacks over the next two hours, with Hurworth expending all her depth charges, and as a result, Eridge was ordered to join the hunt for the submarine. Hero and Eridge continued attack the submarine through the rest of the day, until at about midnight, U-568 surfaced and attempted to escape in the dark, but was spotted and driven down by gunfire from Eridge and Hero. They continued to track the submarine until U-568, her batteries exhausted, was forced to surface at about 03:30 on 28 May. The three destroyers opened fire and U-568's commanding officer ordered the submarine to be scuttled, with the submarine sinking before she could be boarded.

In June 1942, Eridge took part in Operation Vigorous, another attempt to run a convoy from Alexandria to Malta. (Note: This ran in parallel with Operation Harpoon, where a convoy was sent from Gibraltar to Malta.) The convoy came under heavy air attack, and from enemy motor torpedo boats, and after the Italian fleet sortied to intercept it, the convoy turned back. After the destroyer Nestor was badly damaged by German bombers on 15 June, Javelin took her under tow, with Eridge and Beaufort as escorts, however after the towline parted for the second time on the morning of 16 June, Nestor's crew was taken off and the stricken destroyer scuttled by Javelin.

On 11 July 1942, Eridge, together with Beaufort, Dulverton and Hurworth bombarded Mersa Matruh at the same time as an air raid on the port. Eridge took part in the sinking of the cargo ship Sturla which had been driven out to sea by the air attack. The same four destroyers shelled Mersa Matruh on the night of 17/18 July, while on 18/19 July, Eridge, Dulverton and Hurworth again repeated the bombardment. Eridge and Aldenham shelled targets in the vicinity of El Dabaa on the night of 25/26 August 1942.

== Loss ==
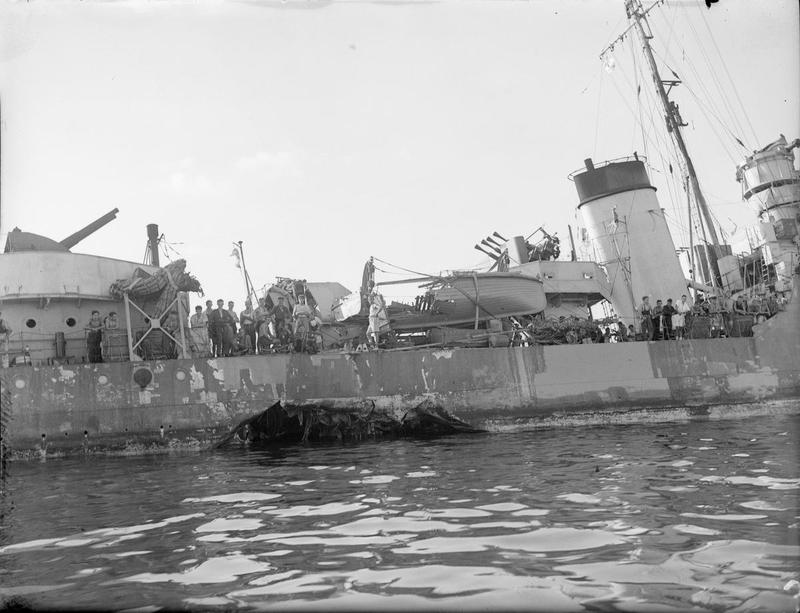
29 August 1942, Alexandria Harbour: torpedo damage to Eridge

At 04:15 on 29 August 1942, Eridge and the destroyers Croome and Hursley, with Aldenham providing cover for the three ships, began shelling enemy positions near El Debaa. The bombardment had been completed, and the ships were retiring to the east, when at about 05:00, at 31°07′N 28°26′E, Eridge was struck by a 450 mm torpedo fired by the Italian small motor torpedo boat MTSM-228. The explosion killed five crew members, flooded the ship's engine room and knocked out her electrics, immobilising Eridge. Eridge was towed back to Alexandria by Aldenham. While the British claimed at the time that the Italian torpedo boat had been sunk, MTSM-228 successfully escaped.

After survey, it was found that the starboard turbines, condenser, gearing and shafting had been damaged beyond repair, and the ship was declared a constructive total loss. She was stripped of useful spares and used as an accommodation ship and a local base shop at Alexandria. Eridge was sold for scrap in October 1946 and broken up in Alexandria.

== Bibliography ==
- Admiralty War Diary March 1941: Days 1–15 (PDF). Admiralty. March 1941.
- Admiralty War Diary May 1941: Days 16–31 (PDF). Admiralty. May 1941.
- Admiralty War Diary February 1942: Days 1–15 (PDF). Admiralty. February 1942.
- Admiralty War Diary July 1942: Days 16–31 (PDF). Admiralty. July 1942.
- Admiralty War Diary August 1942: Days 16–31 (PDF). Admiralty. August 1942.
- Blair, Clay (2000). Hitler's U-Boat War: The Hunters 1939–1942. London: Cassell & Co. ISBN 0-304-35260-8.
- Colledge, J. J.; Warlow, Ben (2006) [1969]. Ships of the Royal Navy: The Complete Record of All Fighting Ships of the Royal Navy from the 15th Century to the Present (3rd Rev ed.). London: Chatham Publishing. ISBN 978-1-86176-281-8. OCLC 67375475.
- English, John (1987). The Hunts: A history of the design, development and careers of the 86 destroyers of this class built for the Royal and Allied Navies during World War II. World Ship Society. ISBN 0-905617-44-4.
- Evans, Arthur S. (2010). Destroyer Down: An Account of HM Destroyer Losses 1939–1945. Barnsley, UK: Pen & Sword Maritime. ISBN 978-1-84884-270-0.
- Friedman, Norman (2008). British Destroyers and Frigates: The Second World War and After. Barnsley, UK: Seaforth Publishing. ISBN 978-1-84832-015-4.
- Gardiner, Robert; Chesneau, Roger, eds. (1980). Conway's All The World's Fighting Ships 1922–1946. London: Conway Maritime Press. ISBN 0-85177-146-7.
- Hepper, David (2022). British Warship Losses in the Modern Era 1920–1982. Barnsley, UK: Seaforth Publishing. ISBN 978-1-3990-9766-6.
- Kemp, Paul (1997). U-Boats Destroyed: German Submarine Losses in the World Wars. London: Arms & Armour Press. ISBN 1-85409-321-5.
- Kemp, Paul (1999). The Admiralty Regrets: British Warship Losses of the 20th Century. Stroud, UK: Sutton Publishing. ISBN 0-7509-1567-6.
- Lenton, H. T. (1970). Navies of the Second World War: British Fleet & Escort Destroyers Volume Two. London: Macdonald & Co. ISBN 0-356-03122-5.
- Manning, T. D.; Walker, C. F. (1959). British Warship Names. London: Putnam.
- Rohwer, Jürgen (2005). Chronology of the War at Sea 1939–1945: The Naval History of World War Two. Annapolis, Maryland, US: Naval Institute Press. ISBN 1-59114-119-2.
- Shores, Christopher; Cull, Brian; Malizia, Nicola (1991). Malta: The Spitfire Year: 1942. London: Grub Street. ISBN 0-948817-16-X.
- Shores, Christopher; Massimello, Giovanni; Guest, Russell; Olnyk, Frank; Bock, Winfried (2012). A History of the Mediterranean Air War 1940–1945: Volume Two: North African Desert: February 1942–March 1943. London: Grub Street. ISBN 978-1-909166-12-7.
- Whitley, M. J. (2000). Destroyers of World War Two: An International Encyclopedia. London: Cassell & Co. ISBN 1-85409-521-8.
- Woodman, Richard (2003). Malta Convoys 1940–1943. London: John Murray. ISBN 0-7195-6408-5.
