= Action of 1 November 1944 =

Naval engagement during World War Two

Coordinates: 44°36′N 14°32′E

- Part of the Adriatic Campaign of World War II
- Location map of Action of 1 November 1994
| Date | 1 November 1944 |
| Location | Kvarner Gulf, Adriatic Sea |
| Result | British victory |

Belligerents
| United Kingdom | Germany |

Commanders and leaders
| Morgan Giles | Friedrich Thorwest † |

Strength
| Destroyer Avon Vale; Destroyer Wheatland | Destroyer TA20; 2 corvettes |

Casualties and losses
| None | 220 killed 7 wounded 90 captured TA20 sunk 2 corvettes sunk |

The action of 1 November 1944, also known as the Ambush off Pag Island, was a naval engagement in the Kvarner Gulf of the Adriatic Sea, between the islands of Pag and Lussino (present-day Lošinj) on 1 November 1944. It was fought between a British Royal Navy destroyer flotilla and a Kriegsmarine force of two corvettes and a destroyer. The German flotilla was deployed to escort a convoy retreating from Šibenik to Fiume (present-day Rijeka). The British managed to destroy all three German ships in return for no loss.

The action caused the death of more than 200 German crewmen. The attacking force rescued 90, and an additional 20 sailors were rescued two days later by German vessels sent to search for survivors. The convoy of 19 landing craft, which was expected to be escorted by the three vessels sunk by the Royal Navy, was not intercepted and it reached its destination by 2 November.

== Background ==
After the Italian capitulation of 8 September 1943, following the Allied invasion of Italy, the Yugoslav Partisans captured most of the eastern Adriatic coast in the region of Dalmatia. The Germans however rushed to occupy these areas particularly the northern Adriatic ports of Trieste, Fiume (present-day Rijeka) and Pula and established the Operational Zone of the Adriatic Littoral (German: Operationszone Adriatisches Küstenland – OZAK), with its headquarters in Trieste on 10 September. Since an Allied landing in the area was anticipated, OZAK also hosted a substantial German military contingent including newly formed German naval units which consisted of many captured Italian warships. As result an engagement with the Royal Navy seemed to be inevitable.

In the second half of 1944 the Royal Navy sent a flotilla into the Adriatic, both to secure the area and to attack German coastal shipping. The coastal shipping became increasingly significant for the German forces deployed in the Independent State of Croatia, and especially Dalmatia—as road and rail routes became unsafe for use because of activity of the Yugoslav Partisans. To deny that option, the Royal Navy initiated Operation Exterminate, primarily aimed at destruction of German corvettes. On 26 October, the Yugoslav Partisans informed Lieutenant Commander Morgan Morgan-Giles, commander of the coastal forces in the north Adriatic, that there were two German destroyers in a cove on the south coast of the Rab Island.

== Prelude ==
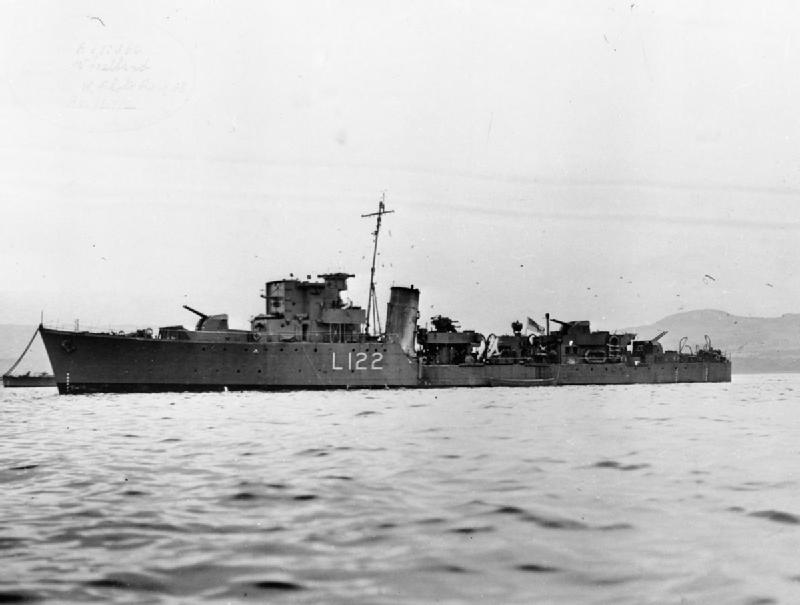
HMS Wheatland at anchor

The German withdrawal from the Dalmatian cities of Zadar and Šibenik to Fiume, codenamed Operation Viking (Operation Wikinger) involved transporting troops and materiel on board two ship convoys, protected by the Kriegsmarine. The withdrawal was a consequence of imminent capture of Zadar and Šibenik by Yugoslav Partisans. The Wikinger II convoy set sail from Šibenik at 17:00 on 1 November. The convoy consisted of Marinefährprahm landing craft MFP 522, MFP 554, MFP 484 and MFP 354, representing group "A" of the convoy, and 13 Combat engineer Landing Craft (Pionier-Landungsboot) and two large Sturmboot assault landing craft, arranged into the group "B".

In the first part of the route, the convoy was protected by the 2nd Group of the 3rd E-boat Flotilla, before the escort duty was turned over to the 2nd Escort Flotilla (Geleitflottille) based in Fiume. The 3rd E-boat Flotilla originally consisted of S 154, S 156 and S 158 E-boats, but during the 25 October Royal Air Force attack on Šibenik, de Havilland Mosquitos sunk S 158 and damaged S 156, leaving only one operational E-boat for the convoy duty. At the time, the only operational vessels of the 2nd Escort Flotilla were Torpedoboot Ausland destroyer TA20 (ex-Italian Urakaze-class destroyer Audace), with a crew of 113, and U-Boot Jäger corvettes UJ 202 and UJ 208 These were ex-Italian Gabbiano-class corvettes Melpómene and Spingarda, with crews of about 110 each, and fast minesweeper R 187. The TA20 was commanded by Oberleutnant zur See der Reserve (Sub-Lieutenant) Heinz Guhrke, the UJ 202 by Oberleutnant zur See der Reserve Heinz Trautwein and UJ 208 by Oberleutnant zur See der Reserve Klaus Wenke.

The TA21 (ex-Italian destroyer Insidioso) remained in port due to problems with fuel quality. The fuel problems also caused the force to depart the port at different times. The corvettes left at 16:00, R 187 sailed a half an hour later, while the TA20 left port at 19:00, with the flotilla commander Korvettenkapitän der Reserve (Lieutenant Commander) Friedrich-Wilhelm Thorwest on board.

== Action ==
Acting upon the information provided by the Yugoslav Partisans, the Royal Navy sortied two Type II Hunt-class destroyers, HMS Avon Vale and HMS Wheatland, from their base at the Ist Island at 17:00 on 1 November. Wheatland was under command of Lieutenant Hugh Askew Corbett, while Avon Vale was under Lieutenant Ivan Hall. The destroyers were accompanied by Motor Torpedo Boats MTB 295, MTB 287 and MTB 274, Motor Gun Boats MGB 642, MGB 638 and MGB 633 and Motor Launch ML494. The destroyers were tasked with landing a team of South African coast watchers on the north tip of Rab, the MTBs with patrolling the Kvarner Gulf between Rab and Krk islands, while the rest of the force loitered southwest, near Premuda. Morgan-Giles commanded the force.

The coast watchers landed at 19:50, the same time the MTBs reported sighting of two enemy "destroyers" sailing south—in fact the two corvettes. Using radar, the corvettes detected the destroyers on their port side at 20:15 and ordered general quarters, while UJ 202 fired two star shells. The crew of R 187 saw this as she followed the corvettes from afar. The destroyers engaged the German corvettes at 20:20, at a position due west of Lun on the island of Pag, assigning a corvette each as a target. The first British salvos scored hits on the corvettes, using their 100-millimetre (3.9 in) guns, from a distance of 3,700 metres (4,000 yards). UJ 202 was hit directly by several shots, knocking out its 100-millimetre (3.9 in) gun, a bow-mounted quadruple 20-millimetre (0.79 in) gun, and a stern-mounted 37-millimetre (1.5 in) gun. Her bridge and radio room were also hit. She continued to return fire while attempting to sail to Rab. UJ 208 was also quickly hit, and its 100-millimetre (3.9 in) and bow-mounted 20-millimetre (0.79 in) guns were knocked out of action. Her crew managed to put out fire on her stern, but another blaze amidships blocked all communications between the forward and aft sections of the vessel. By 20:30, she rolled to the port and began sinking. UJ 202 sank at 21:00.

The Royal Navy force took only ten minutes to disable the corvettes. They then began to pull survivors out of the sea, but the rescue was suspended at about 22:30, when the TA20 was picked up by radar and fired upon. The first salvo hit her bridge killing all officers, and knocking out her fire-control system. She sank close to Pag Island. Neither TA20, nor the corvettes managed to radio news of the attack.

R 187 had maintained radio silence and sailed east to evade detection. It linked up with the convoy sailing from Šibenik at approximately 23:45, and proceeded to escort it north. The combat engineer landing craft reached Kraljevica, except for two which made port in Senj due to poor weather conditions. The rest of the convoy reached Fiume on 2 November. The Royal Navy destroyers sailed back to Ist with empty magazines.

== Aftermath ==
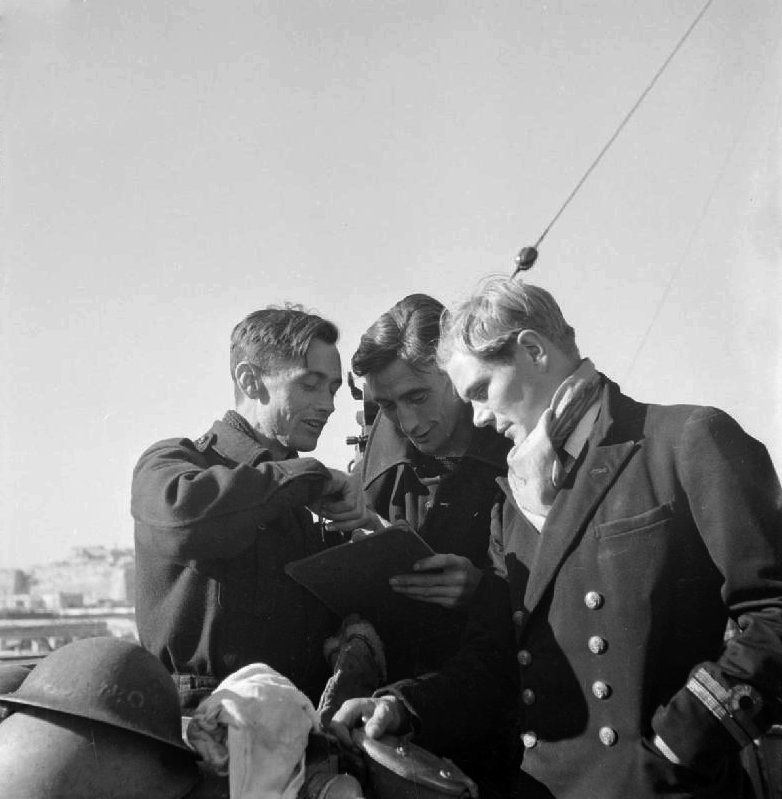
RN officers on HMS Wheatland at Malta, 22 November 1944 describing the action

As weather conditions worsened, Royal Navy destroyers were only able to rescue 90 survivors from the three German ships. Before the rescue operation was suspended to engage TA20, Wheatland pulled out of the sea three officers and 68 seamen—most of them crew of UJ 202. The Kriegsmarine sortied TA40 and TA45 corvettes as well as S 33 and S 154 E-boats to look for survivors, finding seventeen TA20 crew members on the islet of Trstenik on 3 November. The group included seven wounded, tended by a local lighthouse crew. Besides them, the ships rescued one UJ 202 and three UJ 208 crew members from the sea. The deteriorating weather also prevented retrieval of the coast watchers for four days. More than two hundred Germans perished in this action, including the flotilla commander and all three ship commanding officers.

Corbett was awarded the Distinguished Service Order and Hall the Distinguished Service Cross for their "bravery, resolution and skill" in the battle. All four Kriegsmarine commanders involved in the action were posthumously awarded the Knight's Cross of the Iron Cross, and Thorwest was promoted to the rank of Fregattenkapitän (Commander).

Yugoslav Partisans captured Šibenik and Zadar by 3 November 1944, but the war in the Adriatic continued until April 1945. Allied destroyers never engaged large Kriegsmarine vessels in the Adriatic after November 1944. Dwindling German naval assets in the area resulted in limited action, while the last recorded loss was TA45 torpedoed by Royal Navy MTBs in April. Only four Kriegsmarine ships survived to be captured or scuttled when German forces in Italy surrendered at the end of April to advancing forces of the British 8th Army.

The shipwreck of TA20 was found by Italian wreck divers in 1999: she lies on a part of sea floor near a commercial trawling zone, and is regularly obscured by large quantities of silt. The two corvettes were located in 2000. Since divers who found them could not identify them as UJ 202 or UJ 208 specifically, they became known as the "northern" and the "southern" corvette. The northern corvette rests on her keel, with her bow pointing to Rab and her stern partially destroyed, either from hostile fire or secondary explosions from her own depth charges. The divers' description of the wreck indicates that she is UJ 202. The southern corvette lies on her starboard side covered in silt. Several depth charges are still found on her stern in Gatteschi-type racks indicating that the southern corvette is the wreck of UJ 208. The three shipwrecks are a part of "the Ghost Fleet of Pag" (Croatian: Sablasna paška flota) together with the wrecks of HMS Aldenham, and Austro-Hungarian steamships SS Albanien and SS Euterpe.
