= HMS Avon Vale =

Destroyer of the Royal Navy

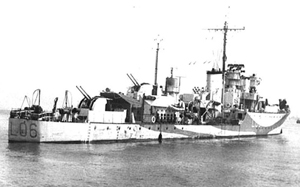
- HMS Avon Vale at Malta in 1941

History

United Kingdom
- Name: HMS Avon Vale
- Ordered: 4 September 1939
- Builder: John Brown Shipbuilding & Engineering Company Ltd. (Clydebank, Scotland)
- Yard number: 569
- Laid down: 12 February 1940
- Launched: 23 October 1940
- Commissioned: 17 February 1941
- Identification: Pennant number: L06
- Honours and awards: Atlantic 1942–43; Malta Convoys 1941–42; Libya 1941–42; Sirte 1942; North Africa 1942–43; Adriatic 1944; English Channel 1943–44
- Fate: Scrapped in 1958

General characteristics
- Class & type: Type II Hunt-class destroyer
- Displacement: 1,050 tons standard; 1,490 tons full load
- Length: 85.34 m (280.0 ft)
- Beam: 9.62 m (31.6 ft)
- Draught: 2.51 m (8 ft 3 in)
- Propulsion: 2 shaft Parsons geared turbines; 19,000 shp
- Speed: 25.5 kn (47.2 km/h; 29.3 mph)
- Range: 3,600 nmi (6,670 km) at 14 knots (26 km/h)
- Complement: 164
- Armament: 6 × QF 4 in Mark XVI on twin mounts Mk. XIX; AA 2 × quadruple .5-inch Vickers, 2 × 20 mm; 6 Thornycroft depth charge throwers

HMS Avon Vale (pennant number L06) was an escort destroyer of the Hunt Type II class. The Royal Navy ordered Avon Vale's construction three days after the outbreak of the Second World War. John Brown Shipbuilding & Engineering Company Ltd laid down her keel at their Clydebank yard on 12 February 1940, as Admiralty Job Number J1569. After a successful Warship Week national savings campaign in February 1942, Avon Vale was adopted by the civil community of Trowbridge, Wiltshire.

== Career ==
=== Early operations ===
Avon Vale began her career on convoy duty in the North Western Approaches with the Irish sea force. The destroyer was worked up at Scapa Flow with ships of the Home Fleet in March, being redeployed with the Irish Sea Force for convoy defence in Irish Sea in April. In May 1941, the Avon Vale was nominated for service in Gibraltar, where she was deployed for convoy defence with the destroyers HMS Eridge and HMS Farndale.

In July, Avon Vale was deployed for escort duties in a Malta convoy GM 1, which consisted a passage through the Western Mediterranean as part of Operation Substance. On 17 July the destroyer joined another Convoy, WS 9c, with the destroyers Eridge, Farndale and HMAS Nestor. Together the destroyers escorted the troopship Pasteur, forming Convoy GM 1, carried servicemen to Gibraltar before taking passage to Malta.

On 20 July the destroyer sailed from Gibraltar to join Force X as escort through the Sicilian Narrows to Malta with HMS Edinburgh, Manchester, Arethusa, the cruiser HMS Manxman, the destroyers HMS Cossack, Maori, Sikh, the destroyers forming Force H at Gibraltar, as well as Nestor, Eridge and Farndale. On 23 July the convoy found itself under close air attacks from Sardinian airfields, during which Manchester and Fearless were damaged and withdrawn from the operation.

=== Service in the Eastern Mediterranean ===
Avon Vale was detached from the convoy to escort the damaged Manchester on her return passage to Gibraltar. During August, Avon Vale was deployed in convoy defence at Gibraltar, from where she escorted Convoy HG 72 on 2 September on its passage from Gibraltar to Liverpool, along with the destroyers Nestor, Broke and the sloop Deptford. Avon Vale was then nominated for service in the eastern Mediterranean, taking passage through Cape of Good Hope and the Indian Ocean, joining the flotilla at Alexandria in November. The destroyer supported the Tobruk garrison.

On 27 November Avon Vale was deployed with the sloop HMAS Parramatta as escorts for the merchantman SS Hanne taking supplies of munitions to Tobruk. The ships were attacked by the German submarine U-559, that torpedoed and sank Parramatta. Avon Vale rescued the twenty survivors from the sloop. On 30 November Avon Vale escorted another convoy, AT 1, to Tobruk with the escort destroyer Heythrop. The convoy was made up of the armed boarding vessels and the merchantman SS Kirkland which carried petrol. On 2 December the destroyer arrived at Tobruk with AT 1, sailing back from Tobruk with Farndale on 5 December as convoy TA 1. The convoy found itself under air attacks, during which SS Chakdina was sunk while carrying prisoners of war, amongst them General Johann von Ravenstein, who was rescued by Farndale.

In January 1942, Avon Vale continued in her operations in support of Tobruk. In February, the destroyer was deployed with Southwold, Beaufort, Dulverton, Hurworth, Eridge and Heythrop of the flotilla in convoy defence in the eastern Mediterranean. On 12 February Avon Vale formed part of the escort for Convoy MW 9A, with the cruiser HMS Carlisle, destroyers Lance, Heythrop and Eridge, which found itself under massed air attacks on 13 February.

=== Action in the Mediterranean ===
On 20 March the destroyer joined the escort for Convoy MW 10 to Malta, with Carlisle and ships of the Fifth Destroyer Flotilla, which was covered by cruisers and destroyers of Mediterranean Fleet. On 22 March the convoy sustained dive bombing attacks, the movement done under threat of surface action with the battleships of the Regia Marina including Littorio and three cruisers. Avon Vale suffered damage during these air attacks and received more damage in a collision. The Second Battle of Sirte an engagement by the covering force was able to prevent a full attack on the convoy. On 29 March Avon Vale was nominated for return to Britain for repairs. The destroyer escorted the damaged cruiser HMS Aurora during the cruiser's passage from Malta to Gibraltar. In April the destroyer left Gibraltar for Falmouth, where she was taken in hand at a commercial shipyard.

=== Repairs and escort duties ===
From May to June the destroyer was under repair, with post repair trials in July, when Avon Vale was nominated for service by the Western Approaches Command for the defence of convoys to and from Western Africa. After working-up, the destroyer joined Western Approaches Command for convoy defence. From August to September Avon Vale was transferred to Freetown. In October, Avon Vale began Atlantic convoying from Freetown. On 20 October she joined military Convoy WS 23, departing from Freetown with the cruiser HMS Durban, HMS Carthage and the Greek destroyer Kanaris as escort during part of the passage to the Cape of Good Hope.

On 23 October the destroyer detached from WS 23 upon being relieved by the sloop HMS Milford and the cruiser HMS Despatch, returning to Freetown. Avon Vale then passed to Gibraltar to escort military convoys before the Operation Torch, the Allied landings in North Africa. On 8 November Avon Vale joined the Central Naval Task Force for the landings at Oran. The destroyer was then released for convoy escort duties, a role which was carried out all through December in support of military operations in North Africa.

=== Further damage ===
In January 1943, Avon Vale was transferred to the 59th Destroyer Division, joining the escort destroyers Calpe, Farndale and Puckeridge at Gibraltar for convoy escort in the western Mediterranean. On 29 January Avon Vale suffered severe damage after she was hit by an aerial torpedo, which destroyed the bow of the destroyer. The aft section was towed back to Gibraltar by Bicester. Temporary repairs were carried out in February to ensure Avon Vale could be towed back safely for permanent repairs. In February the passage had to be deferred until a suitable convoy was available. From March to May the destroyer was deployed at Gibraltar awaiting tow, until she was towed back to the United Kingdom on 25 June as part of convoy MKS 15.

Avon Vale arrived in Britain on 7 July and was taken in hand for repair at HM Dockyard Chatham on 22 July. The forward structure was rebuilt from August to December. The destroyer was under refit between January and March 1944, when she was nominated for transfer to the Royal Hellenic Navy, to be renamed the HHMS Aegaion, the transfer was not carried out because of the mutinous conduct of Greek mariners which manned Royal Navy units at Alexandria.

In April Avon Vale carried out her post repair harbour trials, which were completed on 14 April with the commencement of sea trials. In May, upon completing the trials, and achieving worked-up service, the destroyer was nominated for convoy escort during Operation Neptune. On 6 June Avon Vale was at Portsmouth as part of Force L. The destroyer sailed from Solent with the escort of the Follow-up Convoy L1 from Nore. This escort was made up of the trawler HMS Damsay and the 143rd MMS Flotilla.

=== Back to the Mediterranean ===
In July the destroyer was deployed for convoy defence. In August she was taken again under repairs in a Tyne commercial shipyard, from where she was nominated for service with the 22nd Destroyer Flotilla in the Mediterranean. Upon completing these repairs, Avon Vale took passage to join the flotilla at Alexandria. In September she was deployed with the flotilla in the Eastern Mediterranean, taking part in a number of operations to occupy several islands after the surrender of Italy. Avon Vale was then transferred to the Adriatic for convoy defence, patrols and in support of shore operations. While being deployed with HMS Wheatland, on 1 November, Avon Vale engaged German surface craft south of the island of Lussino, sinking the torpedo boat TA20, and the corvettes UJ202 (Heinz Trautwein) and UJ208 (Klaus Wenke), and rescuing some of the survivors in Action of 1 November 1944. In December the destroyer was nominated for service in the East Indies after a refit in the United Kingdom.

In January 1945 Avon Vale joined the 16th Destroyer Flotilla, based at Harwich, pending her refit prior to service in the Indies. The refit was arranged at the port of Taranto, Italy. The destroyer was taken in hand for refit in March, which was completed in May. Upon completing the refit, the destroyer returned to the United Kingdom, for pay off and the recommissioning for her service overseas. The recommissioning occurred in June, while a work-up for operational service in the Mediterranean was carried out in July. In August the deployment was cancelled, and Avon Vale returned to the United Kingdom for pay off and a reduction to reserve.

=== Post war status ===
Avon Vale paid-off at Devonport, and was laid up in reserve at Plymouth on 10 December 1945. The destroyer was transferred to the Sheerness Reserve Fleet after a refit at HM Dockyard Sheerness in 1949. When Sheerness Division was closed, Avon Vale was transferred to Hartlepool and laid up there until placed on the Disposal List. The destroyer was sold to BISCO in 1958 for demolition by TA Young at Sunderland. Avon Vale arrived in tow at the breaker's yard on 15 May of that year.
