= HMS Heythrop (L85) =

Destroyer of the Royal Navy

History

United Kingdom
- Name: Heythrop
- Namesake: Heythrop Hunt
- Ordered: 4 September 1939
- Builder: Swan Hunter, Tyne and Wear
- Yard number: J4139
- Laid down: 18 December 1939
- Launched: 20 October 1940
- Commissioned: 21 June 1941
- Identification: Pennant number: L85
- Honours and awards: Battle Honours; Atlantic 1941; Libya 1941/42; Malta Convoys 1941/42
- Fate: Sunk by torpedo 20 March 1942

General characteristics Type II
- Class & type: Hunt-class destroyer
- Displacement: 1,050 long tons (1,070 t) standard; 1,430 long tons (1,450 t) full load
- Length: 85.3 m (279 ft 10 in) o/a
- Beam: 9.6 m (31 ft 6 in)
- Draught: 2.51 m (8 ft 3 in)
- Propulsion: 2 Admiralty 3-drum boilers; 2 shaft Parsons geared turbines, 19,000 shp (14,000 kW)
- Speed: 27 knots (31 mph; 50 km/h); 25.5 kn (29.3 mph; 47.2 km/h) full
- Range: 3,600 nmi (6,700 km) at 14 kn (26 km/h)
- Complement: 164
- Armament: 6 × QF 4 in Mark XVI on twin mounts Mk. XIX; 4 × QF 2 pdr Mk. VIII on quad mount MK.VII; 2 × 20 mm Oerlikons on single mounts P Mk. III; 110 depth charges, 2 throwers, 3 racks

Service record

HMS Heythrop (L85) was a Hunt-class destroyer of the Royal Navy She was ordered as part of the 1939 War Emergency programme. She was launched in 1940 and served during the Second World War. She was named after the Heythrop Hunt.

== Service history ==
On completion Heythorp proceeded to the Mediterranean where she was employed on escort tasks until her loss. On 20 March 1942 she was 40 miles (64 km) northeast of Bardia when she was hit by a torpedo fired by U-652. She was severely damaged and was taken under tow however when her pumps could not cope she was abandoned and the crew transferred by boat to HMS Eridge. She sank later that day.

== Publications ==
- Colledge, J. J.; Warlow, Ben (2006) [1969]. Ships of the Royal Navy: The Complete Record of All Fighting Ships of the Royal Navy from the 15th Century to the Present (3rd Rev ed.). London: Chatham Publishing. ISBN 978-1-86176-281-8. OCLC 67375475.
- English, John (1987). The Hunts: a history of the design, development and careers of the 86 destroyers of this class built for the Royal and Allied Navies during World War II. England: World Ship Society. ISBN 0-905617-44-4.
