= Luigi Spalice =

Italian admiral

- Born: 16 February 1880; Naples, Kingdom of Italy
- Died: 3 February 1974 (aged 93); Rome, Italy
- Military career
- Allegiance: Kingdom of Italy
- Branch: Regia Marina
- Service years: 1898–1943
- Rank: Vice Admiral
- Commands: 59 OL (torpedo boat); 55 AS (torpedo boat); Vincenzo Giordano Orsini (destroyer); Ascaro (destroyer); Premuda (destroyer); Giulio Cesare (battleship); Andrea Doria (battleship); Zara (heavy cruiser); Taranto Naval Fortress Area; Albania Naval Command; Vlore Naval Command; Brindisi Naval Fortress Area; Brindisi Naval Command
- Conflicts: Italo-Turkish War; World War I; Vlora War; Corfu crisis; Second Italo-Ethiopian War; World War II
- Awards: War Cross for Military Valor (twice); Order of the Crown of Italy; Order of Saints Maurice and Lazarus; Order of Merit of the Italian Republic

Luigi Spalice (16 February 1880 – 3 February 1974) was an admiral in the Regia Marina during World War II.

== Biography ==
Born in Naples in 1880, he entered the Royal Naval Academy of Livorno in 1898, and graduated in 1902 with the rank of ensign, after which he was assigned on the battleships Ammiraglio di Saint Bon, Sardegna and Re Umberto. After promotion to lieutenant in 1911, he participated in the Italo-Turkish War on Re Umberto and then on the armoured cruiser San Giorgio.

During the First World War he commanded the torpedo boats 59 OL and 55 AS, earning two War Crosses for Military Valor. In 1918 he was promoted to lieutenant commander and assigned on the scout cruiser Marsala, after which he commanded the destroyers Vincenzo Giordano Orsini (during the Vlora War) and Ascaro. In 1923 he participated in the brief occupation of Corfu during the crisis between Italy and Greece, after which he was assigned to the command of the Naval Department of Taranto. In 1924 he was promoted to commander and transferred to the command of the La Spezia Naval Department, after which he attended the Institute of Naval War. In 1927 he briefly served as Chief of Staff of the Naval Department of La Spezia, after which he was transferred to the Naval Weapons Directorate of the same command.

In 1928–1929 he commanded the destroyer Premuda and was then appointed head of the training office of the CREM. After promotion to captain he became naval attaché in Spain and Portugal until 1932, when he was given command of the battleship Giulio Cesare, then of Andrea Doria and then in 1933–1934 of the heavy cruiser Zara. In 1934–1935 he became Chief of Staff of the Naval Command of Sicily, then commander of the anti-aircraft defense of Taranto in 1935–1936. After the Second Italo-Ethiopian War he was transferred to the naval reserve, being promoted to rear admiral in 1938.

In 1939, shortly before the outbreak of World War II, he was recalled into service and given command of the Taranto Naval Fortress Area. In 1940 he was appointed naval commander of Albania, and later of the Vlore Naval Command. In 1941–1942, after promotion to vice admiral, he became commander of the Brindisi Naval Fortress Area and of its naval command. From May 1943 he served as member of the commission for prisoners of war until late September, when he was definitively exempted from active service following the armistice of Cassibile.

From 1954 to 1964 he was the first president of the Associazione Nazionale Marinai d'Italia (ANMI), the Italian Navy's veterans' organization. He died in Rome in 1974.
