= Operation Farrier =

Operation Farrier was a raid by British Commandos during the Second World War on the Yugoslavian island of Mljet.

The raid by the Long Range Desert Group, No. 2 Commando and No. 43 (Royal Marine) Commando, all under the command of the 2nd Special Service Brigade, started on 22 May 1944. It came about because a previously planned raid "Operation Foothound" on the Ugljan and Pašman islands had to be abandoned.

There were already some small partisan units and an American Office of Strategic Services agent on Mljet who supplied intelligence on the strength and locations of German forces. In the early morning of 22 May the commandos, divided into two groups, landed on the south coast of Mljet. They manoeuvred behind the supposed German positions at Babino Polje and called on them to surrender. Moving in closer they discovered that the Germans had withdrawn from their positions. Some German mortars then landed amongst the commandos and unable to locate their position returned to their waiting ships and returned to Vis island.
