= HMS Wheatland =

Destroyer of the Royal Navy

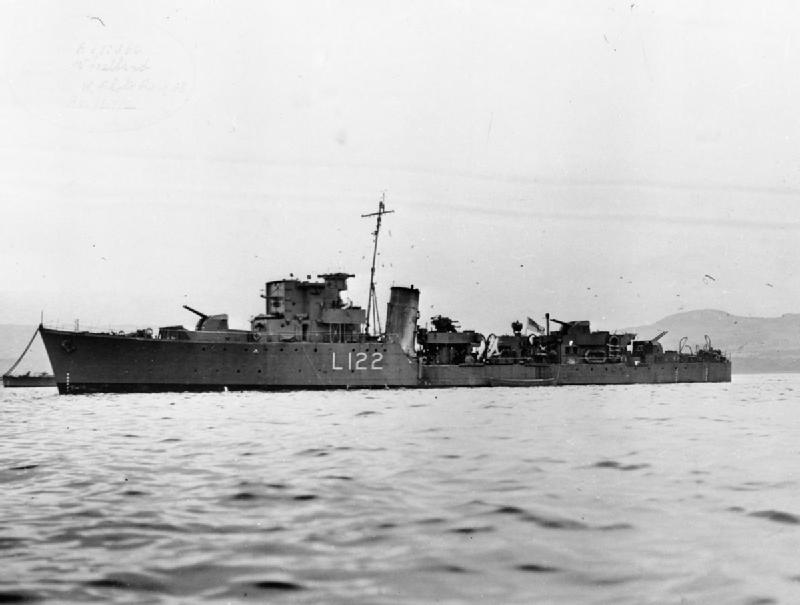
- Wheatland during the Second World War

History

United Kingdom
- Name: HMS Wheatland
- Ordered: 4 September 1939
- Builder: Yarrow Shipbuilders
- Laid down: 30 May 1940
- Launched: 7 June 1941
- Commissioned: 3 November 1941
- Decommissioned: 19 June 1945
- Identification: Pennant number: L122
- Honours and awards: Arctic 1942, North Africa 1942–43, Sicily 1943, Mediterranean 1943, Salerno 1943, Adriatic 1944
- Fate: Scrapped at Bo'ness on 20 September 1957

General characteristics Type II
- Class & type: Hunt-class destroyer
- Displacement: 1,050 long tons (1,070 t) standard; 1,430 long tons (1,450 t) full load
- Length: 85.3 m (279 ft 10 in) o/a
- Beam: 9.6 m (31 ft 6 in)
- Draught: 2.51 m (8 ft 3 in)
- Propulsion: 2 Admiralty 3-drum boilers; 2 shaft Parsons geared turbines, 19,000 shp (14,000 kW)
- Speed: 27 knots (31 mph; 50 km/h); 25.5 kn (29.3 mph; 47.2 km/h) full
- Range: 3,600 nmi (6,700 km) at 14 kn (26 km/h)
- Complement: 164
- Armament: 6 × QF 4-inch (102 mm) Mark XVI guns on twin mounts Mk. XIX; 4 × QF 2-pounder (40 mm) Mk. VIII AA guns on quad mount MK.VII; 2 × 20 mm Oerlikon AA guns on single mounts P Mk. III; 110 depth charges, 2 throwers, 3 racks

HMS Wheatland was a Type 2 Hunt-class destroyer of the Royal Navy that served in the Second World War.

== Construction ==
Wheatland was ordered from Yarrow Shipbuilders, Scotstoun on 4 September 1939, one of 17 Hunt-class destroyers ordered on that day as part of the 1939 Emergency War Programme. The ship was laid down on 30 May 1940 and was launched on 7 June 1941, commissioning (with the pennant number L122) on 3 November 1941. She was named after "The Wheatland Hunt", an annual fox hunt held in Shropshire. During Warship Week in 1942 she was adopted by the town of Uttoxeter.

== Wartime service ==
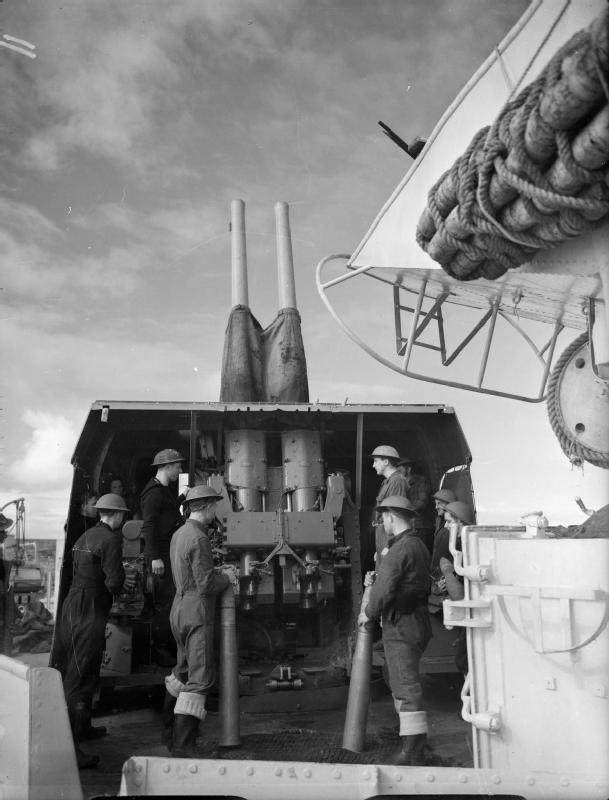
Gunners on Wheatland man twin 4-inch anti-aircraft guns

On completion in 1941 Wheatland was sent to Scapa Flow as part of the Naval Force to undertake the Commando raid on the Lofoten Islands. The following year she took part in escort duties in support of the Russian Convoys. In 1943 she served in the Mediterranean, including support for the Sicily landings in July of that year. This included shore bombardment of Taormina on Sicily.

In 1944 she continued operations in the Mediterranean on convoy duties, including in July 1944 being nominated for escort duties in the planned landings in the south of France.

While being deployed with HMS Avon Vale, on 1 November 1944, Wheatland engaged German surface craft south of the island of Lussino, sinking the torpedo boat TA20, and the corvettes UJ202 and UJ208, and rescuing some of the survivors in Action of 1 November 1944.

== Post war ==
After the war Wheatland returned to Devonport and transferred to the Reserve Fleet. She stayed there until 1953 when she was towed to Gibraltar where she remained in reserve. In 1955 she was brought back to Harwich before being placed on the disposal list. She remained there until September 1957 when she was sold to BISCO for scrapping by McLennan. She arrived at their breakers yard in Bo'ness on 20 September 1957.

== Publications ==
- Colledge, J. J.; Warlow, Ben (2006) [1969]. Ships of the Royal Navy: The Complete Record of All Fighting Ships of the Royal Navy from the 15th Century to the Present (3rd Rev ed.). London: Chatham Publishing. ISBN 978-1-86176-281-8. OCLC 67375475.
- English, John (1987). The Hunts: A history of the design, development and careers of the 86 destroyers of this class built for the Royal and Allied Navies during World War II. World Ship Society. ISBN 0-905617-44-4.
