= Operation Pedestal orders of battle =

- Part of the Siege of Malta in the Battle of the Mediterranean
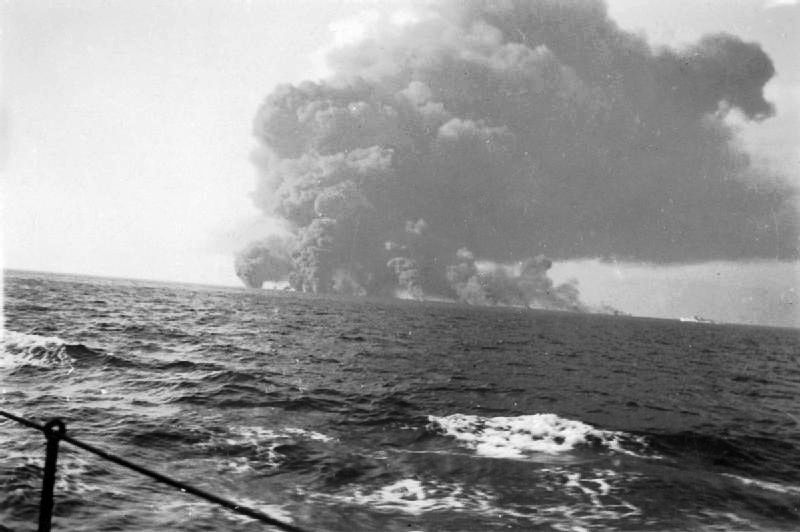
- The column of smoke from Waimarama just after she exploded
Date	3–15 August 1942
Location	Mediterranean Sea 35°N 18°E
Result	See Aftermath section

Belligerents
United Kingdom; United States	Italy; Germany

Commanders and leaders
(United Kingdom) Neville Syfret; (United Kingdom) Harold Burrough	(Fascist Italy) Alberto Da Zara; (Nazi Germany) Albert Kesselring

Strength
Force H; Home Fleet; 13 merchant ships; 1 tanker; land-based FAA, RAF aircraft	Regia Marina battlefleet; 21 submarines; 285 bombers; 304 fighters

Casualties and losses
4 warships sunk; 9 merchant ships sunk; 1 aircraft carrier damaged; 2 light cruisers damaged; 3 merchant ships damaged; 34 aircraft destroyed; 350–550+ killed	2 submarines sunk; 1 heavy cruiser damaged; 1 light cruiser damaged; 1 submarine damaged; 48–60 aircraft destroyed; c. 100 killed or missing

Operation Pedestal was a British convoy operation to supply the island of Malta in August 1942, during the Second World War. This article lists the ships and aircraft involved in the convoy and those of the Axis forces that opposed it.

From 1940 to 1942, the Axis besieged Malta in what became known as the Siege of Malta (1940). The island was a crucial base for the British in the Mediterranean theatre of the war and could not produce sufficient foodstuffs for the population and the garrison without regular deliveries by ship of food, medicines, equipment and military stores. The island ceased to be an offensive base for much of 1942 and the failure of Operation Harpoon (12–15 June 1942 ) left Malta so short of supplies that its surrender was calculated in weeks. Pedestal was a maximum effort to supply Malta in which ships from the Home Fleet were dispatched to Gibraltar to reinforce Force H, for the convoy and for Operation Torch. The next scheduled Arctic convoy, Convoy PQ 19, was cancelled for lack escorts that had been diverted for Pedestal.

The convoy sailed from Britain on 3 August 1942 and passed through the Strait of Gibraltar into the Mediterranean on the night of 9/10 August. Enough supplies were delivered for the population and the garrison on Malta to resume offensive operations. Fuel was carried by the US tanker Ohio, crewed by a British sailors, that reached Malta after an epic voyage, towed for much of the last leg by destroyers. Ohio sank in harbour but most of its fuel was recovered. The Axis attempt to prevent the convoy reaching Malta, with bombers, German E-boats, Italian MAS and MS boats, minefields and submarine ambushes, was their last sizeable success in the Mediterranean. More than 500 Merchant Navy and Royal Navy sailors and airmen were killed, nine of the thirteen merchant ships were sunk and the tanker Ohio was severely damaged.

Pedestal was a costly strategic victory for the British. The arrival of Ohio justified the risks taken because its cargo of aviation fuel revitalised the Maltese air offensive against Axis shipping. Submarines and torpedo-bombers returned to Malta and Spitfire fighters flown from the aircraft carrier HMS Furious enabled a maximum effort to be made against Axis ships. Italian convoys had to detour further away from the island, lengthening the journey and increasing the time during which air and naval attacks could be mounted. The Siege of Malta was broken by the Allied re-conquest of Egypt and Libya after the Second Battle of El Alamein (23 October – 11 November) and by Operation Torch (8–16 November) in the western Mediterranean, which enabled land-based aircraft to escort merchant ships to the island.

== Order of battle, Force F ==
=== Force P ===
Convoy WS.21S
Ship	Year	Flag	GRT	Notes
SS Almeria Lykes	1940	United States	7,821	Sunk by MAS 554, no casualties
MV Brisbane Star	1936	Merchant Navy	11,076	
MV Clan Ferguson	1938	Merchant Navy	7,347	Sunk by aircraft, 18 killed
MV Deucalion	1914	Netherlands	1,796	Sunk by aircraft, 1 killed
MV Dorset	1934	Merchant Navy	10,624	Sunk by aircraft, no casualties
MV Empire Hope	1941	Merchant Navy	12,668	Sunk by aircraft, no casualties
MV Glenorchy	1939	Merchant Navy	8,982	Sunk by MS 31, 7 killed
MV Melbourne Star	1936	Merchant Navy	12,806	
SS Ohio	1940	Merchant Navy	9,265	Damaged by aircraft, 2 killed, sank in harbour
MV Port Chalmers	1933	Merchant Navy	8,535	Convoy commodore A. G. Venables
MV Rochester Castle	1937	Merchant Navy	7,795	
SS Santa Elisa	1940	United States	8,380	Sunk by S 36, 4 killed
MV Waimarama	1938	Merchant Navy	12,843	Sunk by aircraft, 83 killed
MV Wairangi	1935	Merchant Navy	10,796	Sunk

=== Ocean escort ===
Force P, Britain to rendezvous
Ship	Flag	Type	Notes
HMS Nelson	Royal Navy	Nelson-class battleship	Flag, Vice-Admiral Edward Syfret
HMS Rodney	Royal Navy	Nelson-class battleship	
HMS Kenya	Royal Navy	Fiji-class cruiser	10th Cruiser Flotilla
HMS Nigeria	Royal Navy	Fiji-class cruiser	Flag, Rear-Admiral Harold Burrough, 10th Cruiser Flotilla
HMS Eskimo	Royal Navy	Tribal-class destroyer	19th Destroyer Flotilla
HMS Somali	Royal Navy	Tribal-class destroyer	19th Destroyer Flotilla
HMS Tartar	Royal Navy	Tribal-class destroyer	19th Destroyer Flotilla
HMS Amazon	Royal Navy	Amazon-class destroyer	From Western Approaches Command
HMS Pathfinder	Royal Navy	P-class destroyer	6th Destroyer Flotilla
HMS Quentin	Royal Navy	Q-class destroyer	19th Destroyer Flotilla
HMS Malcolm	Royal Navy	Scott-class destroyer	From Western Approaches Command
HMS Keppel	Royal Navy	Shakespeare-class destroyer	From Western Approaches Command, replaced HMS Lamerton
HMS Venomous	Royal Navy	V-class destroyer	From Western Approaches Command
HMS Vidette	Royal Navy	V-class destroyer	From Western Approaches Command
HMS Wishart	Royal Navy	W-class destroyer	19th Destroyer Flotilla
HMS Wolverine	Royal Navy	W-class destroyer	From Western Approaches Command
HMS Wilton	Royal Navy	Hunt-class destroyer	19th Destroyer Flotilla
HMS Bicester	Royal Navy	Hunt-class destroyer	
HMS Bramham	Royal Navy	Hunt-class destroyer	
HMS Derwent	Royal Navy	Hunt-class destroyer	
HMS Ledbury	Royal Navy	Hunt-class destroyer	
HMS Zetland	Royal Navy	Hunt-class destroyer	19th Destroyer Flotilla

=== Operation Berserk ===
Rendezvous for convoy and escort signalling and manoeuvre rehearsals, 6 to 9 August

==== Force J ====
Gibraltar to rendezvous
Ship	Flag	Type	Notes
HMS Eagle	Royal Navy	Aircraft carrier	From Gibraltar
HMS Charybdis	Royal Navy	Dido-class cruiser	From Gibraltar
HMS Vansittart	Royal Navy	V-class destroyer	From Gibraltar
HMS Westcott	Royal Navy	W-class destroyer	From Gibraltar
HMS Wrestler	Royal Navy	W-class destroyer	From Gibraltar

==== Force K ====
Freetown to rendezvous
Ship	Flag	Type	Notes
HMS Indomitable	Royal Navy	Illustrious-class aircraft carrier	From Freetown
HMS Phoebe	Royal Navy	Dido-class cruiser	From Freetown
HMS Laforey	Royal Navy	L-class destroyer	From Freetown
HMS Lightning	Royal Navy	L-class destroyer	From Freetown
HMS Lookout	Royal Navy	L-class destroyer	From Freetown

==== Force M ====
Britain to rendezvous
Ship	Flag	Type	Notes
HMS Argus	Royal Navy	Aircraft carrier	Flag, Rear-Admiral Lumley Lyster from Scapa Flow
HMS Victorious	Royal Navy	Illustrious-class aircraft carrier	Flag, Rear-Admiral Lumley Lyster from Scapa Flow
HMS Nelson	Royal Navy	Nelson-class battleship	Flag, Vice-Admiral Edward Syfret from Scapa Flow
HMS Rodney	Royal Navy	Nelson-class battleship	From Scapa Flow
HMS Sirius	Royal Navy	Dido-class cruiser	From Scapa Flow
HMS Foresight	Royal Navy	F-class destroyer	Minesweeper
HMS Fury	Royal Navy	F-class destroyer	Minesweeper
HMS Icarus	Royal Navy	I-class destroyer	Minesweeper
HMS Intrepid	Royal Navy	I-class destroyer	
HMS Sardonyx	Royal Navy	S-class destroyer	
HMS Buxton	Royal Navy	Town-class destroyer	From Scapa Flow

==== Force W ====
Fleet oiler and escorts, Britain to rendezvous
Ship	Flag	Type	Notes
RFA Abbeydale	Royal Fleet Auxiliary	Dale-class oiler	
HMS Armeria	Royal Navy	Flower-class corvette	
HMS Burdock	Royal Navy	Flower-class corvette	

=== Fleet Air Arm ===
Sea component
Sqn	Flag	Type	No.	Notes
801 Naval Air Squadron	Royal Navy	Sea Hurricane	16	Embarked in HMS Eagle
813 Naval Air Squadron	Royal Navy	Sea Hurricane	4	Embarked in HMS Eagle
800 Naval Air Squadron	Royal Navy	Sea Hurricane	—	Embarked in HMS Indomitable
806 Naval Air Squadron	Royal Navy	Martlet	9	Embarked in HMS Indomitable
827 Naval Air Squadron	Royal Navy	Albacore	16	Embarked in HMS Indomitable
831 Naval Air Squadron	Royal Navy	Albacore	—	Embarked in HMS Indomitable
880 Naval Air Squadron	Royal Navy	Sea Hurricane	—	Embarked in HMS Indomitable
809 Naval Air Squadron	Royal Navy	Fulmar	8	Embarked in HMS Victorious
832 Naval Air Squadron	Royal Navy	Albacore	12	Embarked in HMS Victorious
884 Naval Air Squadron	Royal Navy	Fulmar	8	Embarked in HMS Victorious
885 Naval Air Squadron	Royal Navy	Sea Hurricane	5	Embarked in HMS Victorious

Land component
Sqn	Flag	Type	No.	Notes
828 Naval Air Squadron	Royal Navy	Albacore	27	Based at RAF Hal Far, Malta
830 Naval Air Squadron	Royal Navy	Swordfish	1	Based at RAF Hal Far, Malta

=== Force R ===
Fuelling detachment
Ship	Flag	Type	Notes
RFA Brown Ranger	Royal Fleet Auxiliary	Ranger-class tanker	
RFA Dingledale	Royal Fleet Auxiliary	Dale-class tanker	
HMS Coltsfoot	Royal Navy	Flower-class corvette	
HMS Geranium	Royal Navy	Flower-class corvette	
HMS Jonquil	Royal Navy	Flower-class corvette	
HMS Spiraea	Royal Navy	Flower-class corvette	
HMS Salvonia	Royal Navy	Ocean-going tug	

=== Force X ===
Close escort to Malta (data from Smith [1987] unless indicated)
Flag|Type	Notes		
HMS Cairo	Royal Navy	C-class cruiser	Torpedoed 12 August, Axum, 37°40'N, 10°06'E, scuttled 13 August
HMS Manchester	Royal Navy	Town-class cruiser	Torpedoed by MS boat, 36°50'N, 11°10'E, scuttled
HMS Kenya	Royal Navy	Fiji-class cruiser	Damaged, 12 August, U-boats
HMS Nigeria	Royal Navy	Fiji-class cruiser	Flag, Rear-Admiral Harold Burrough, damaged, 12 August, U-boat
HMS Ashanti	Royal Navy	Tribal-class destroyer	6th Destroyer Flotilla
HMS Foresight	Royal Navy	F-class destroyer	Torpedoed by aircraft, 12 August, 37°40'N, 10°00'E scuttled 13 August
HMS Fury	Royal Navy	F-class destroyer	6th Destroyer Flotilla
HMS Icarus	Royal Navy	I-class destroyer	6th Destroyer Flotilla
HMS Intrepid	Royal Navy	I-class destroyer	6th Destroyer Flotilla
HMS Pathfinder	Royal Navy	P-class destroyer	6th Destroyer Flotilla
HMS Penn	Royal Navy	P-class destroyer	6th Destroyer Flotilla
HMS Bicester	Royal Navy	Hunt-class destroyer	6th Destroyer Flotilla
HMS Bramham	Royal Navy	Hunt-class destroyer	6th Destroyer Flotilla
HMS Derwent	Royal Navy	Hunt-class destroyer	6th Destroyer Flotilla
HMS Ledbury	Royal Navy	Hunt-class destroyer	6th Destroyer Flotilla
HMS Jaunty	Royal Navy	Assurance-class tug	Ocean-going tug

=== Force Y ===
==== Operation Ascendant ====
Ship	Year	Flag	GRT	Notes
MV Orari	1931	United Kingdom	10,350	Reefer ship, empty since Operation Harpoon, returning from Malta to Gibraltar
SS Troilus	1921	United Kingdom	7,422	Empty since Operation Harpoon, returning from Malta to Gibraltar

Escorts
Ship	Flag	Type	Notes
HMS Matchless	Royal Navy	M-class destroyer	Escort
HMS Badsworth	Royal Navy	Hunt-class destroyer	Escort

=== Force Z ===
Heavy cover and air support
Ship	Flag	Type	Notes
HMS Eagle	Royal Navy	Aircraft carrier	11 August, sunk, U-73, 38°05'N, 03°02'E
HMS Indomitable	Royal Navy	Illustrious-class aircraft carrier	
HMS Victorious	Royal Navy	Illustrious-class aircraft carrier	Flag, Rear-Admiral Lumley Lyster
HMS Nelson	Royal Navy	Nelson-class battleship	Flag, Force F, Vice-Admiral Edward Syfret
HMS Rodney	Royal Navy	Nelson-class battleship	
HMS Charybdis	Royal Navy	Dido-class cruiser	
HMS Phoebe	Royal Navy	Dido-class cruiser	
HMS Sirius	Royal Navy	Dido-class cruiser	
HMS Antelope	Royal Navy	A-class destroyer	19th Destroyer Flotilla
HMS Ithuriel	Royal Navy	I-class destroyer	19th Destroyer Flotilla
HMS Laforey	Royal Navy	L-class destroyer	19th Destroyer Flotilla
HMS Lightning	Royal Navy	L-class destroyer	19th Destroyer Flotilla
HMS Lookout	Royal Navy	L-class destroyer	19th Destroyer Flotilla
HMS Quentin	Royal Navy	Q-class destroyer	19th Destroyer Flotilla
HMS Eskimo	Royal Navy	Tribal-class destroyer	19th Destroyer Flotilla
HMS Somali	Royal Navy	Tribal-class destroyer	19th Destroyer Flotilla
HMS Tartar	Royal Navy	Tribal-class destroyer	19th Destroyer Flotilla
HMS Vansittart	Royal Navy	V-class destroyer	19th Destroyer Flotilla
HMS Westcott	Royal Navy	W-class destroyer	19th Destroyer Flotilla
HMS Wishart	Royal Navy	W-class destroyer	19th Destroyer Flotilla
HMS Wolverine	Royal Navy	W-class destroyer	Sank Dagabur
HMS Wrestler	Royal Navy	W-class destroyer	19th Destroyer Flotilla
HMS Wilton	Royal Navy	Hunt-class destroyer	19th Destroyer Flotilla
HMS Zetland	Royal Navy	Hunt-class destroyer	19th Destroyer Flotilla

=== Malta Escort Force ===
Vessels delivered to Malta in Operation Harpoon
Ship	Flag	Type	Notes
HMS Hebe	Royal Navy	Halcyon-class minesweeper	14th/17th Minesweeper Flotilla
HMS Hythe	Royal Navy	Halcyon-class minesweeper	14th/17th Minesweeper Flotilla
HMS Rye	Royal Navy	Halcyon-class minesweeper	14th/17th Minesweeper Flotilla
HMS Speedy	Royal Navy	Halcyon-class minesweeper	14th/17th Minesweeper Flotilla
ML 121	Royal Navy	Fairmile B motor launch	3rd Motor Launch Flotilla
ML 126	Royal Navy	Fairmile B motor launch	3rd Motor Launch Flotilla
ML 134	Royal Navy	Fairmile B motor launch	3rd Motor Launch Flotilla
ML 135	Royal Navy	Fairmile B motor launch	3rd Motor Launch Flotilla
ML 168	Royal Navy	Fairmile B motor launch	3rd Motor Launch Flotilla
ML 459	Royal Navy	Fairmile B motor launch	3rd Motor Launch Flotilla
ML 462	Royal Navy	Fairmile B motor launch	3rd Motor Launch Flotilla

=== 10th Submarine Flotilla ===
Patrols to intercept Regia Marina vessels
Ship	Flag	Type	Notes
HMS P222	Royal Navy	S-class submarine	Patrolling between Malta and Tunisia
HMS Safari	Royal Navy	S-class submarine	Patrolling off Milazzo
HMS P31	Royal Navy	U-class submarine	Patrolling between Malta and Tunisia
HMS P34	Royal Navy	U-class submarine	Patrolling between Malta and Tunisia
HMS Unbroken	Royal Navy	U-class submarine	Patrolling off Palermo
HMS United	Royal Navy	U-class submarine	Patrolling between Malta and Tunisia
HMS Unruffled	Royal Navy	U-class submarine	Patrolling between Malta and Tunisia
HMS Utmost	Royal Navy	U-class submarine	Patrolling between Malta and Tunisia

=== Club Run to Malta ===
Operation Bellows
Ship	Flag	Type	Notes
HMS Furious	Royal Navy	Courageous-class aircraft carrier	40 of 42 Spitfires, 38 to Malta, 2 early returns (Note: Furious made another Club Run. On 17 August 32 Spitfires were dispatched, 29 arriving at Malta. Furious returned to Gibraltar on 19 August.)

Aircraft delivery
Sqn	Flag	Type	No.	Notes
—	Royal Air Force	Spitfire VB	42	Embarked in HMS Furious
823 Naval Air Squadron	Royal Navy	Albacore	4	Spare aircraft, embarked in HMS Furious

=== Reserve Escort Group ===
Reserve destroyers
Ship	Flag	Type	Notes
HMS Amazon	Royal Navy	Amazon-class destroyer	
HMS Keppel	Royal Navy	Shakespeare-class destroyer	
HMS Malcolm	Royal Navy	Scott-class destroyer	
HMS Venomous	Royal Navy	V-class destroyer	
HMS Vidette	Royal Navy	V-class destroyer	
HMS Westcott	Royal Navy	W-class destroyer	
HMS Wolverine	Royal Navy	W-class destroyer	
HMS Wrestler	Royal Navy	W-class destroyer	

=== RAF Malta ===
RAF squadrons at Malta (Note: On 10 August the RAF had 141 aircraft in Malta and on 14 August 186 were available.)
Sqn	Flag	Type	Role	Notes
126 Squadron	Royal Air Force	Spitfire	Fighter	
185 Squadron	Royal Air Force	Spitfire	Fighter	
229 Squadron	Royal Air Force	Spitfire	Fighter	
249 Squadron	Royal Air Force	Spitfire	Fighter	
1435 Squadron	Royal Air Force	Spitfire	Fighter	
235 Squadron	Royal Air Force	Beaufighter	Heavy fighter	
248 Squadron	Royal Air Force	Beaufighter	Heavy fighter	
252 Squadron	Royal Air Force	Beaufighter	Heavy fighter	
89 Squadron	Royal Air Force	Beaufighter	Night fighter	
39 Squadron	Royal Air Force	Beaufort	Torpedo-bomber	
86 Squadron	Royal Air Force	Beaufort	Torpedo-bomber	
217 Squadron	Royal Air Force	Beaufort	Torpedo-bomber	
38 Squadron	Royal Air Force	Wellington	Night bomber	
40 Squadron	Royal Air Force	Wellington	Night bomber	
159 Squadron	Royal Air Force	Liberator	Night bomber	
55 Squadron	Royal Air Force	Baltimore	Day bomber	
69 Squadron	Royal Air Force	—	Reconnaissance	Baltimore, Wellington, PRU Spitfire
203 Squadron	Royal Air Force	Maryland	Reconnaissance	RAF Middle East Command

=== Operation MG 3 ===
==== Convoy MW12a ====
Port Said
Ship	Year	Flag	GRT	Notes
SS City of Pretoria	1937	Merchant Navy	8,049	
SS City of Lincoln	1938	Merchant Navy	8,039	
MV City of Edinburgh	1938	Merchant Navy	8,036	

==== Escorts, Convoy MW 12a ====
Convoy MW 12a escorts
Ship	Flag	Type	Notes
HMS Arethusa	Royal Navy	Arethusa-class cruiser	
HMS Euryalus	Royal Navy	Dido-class cruiser	
HMS Coventry	Royal Navy	C-class cruiser	
HMS Jervis	Royal Navy	J-class destroyer	
HMS Kelvin	Royal Navy	K-class destroyer	
HMS Pakenham	Royal Navy	P-class destroyer	
HMS Paladin	Royal Navy	P-class destroyer	
HMS Beaufort	Royal Navy	Hunt-class destroyer	
HMS Belvoir	Royal Navy	Hunt-class destroyer	
HMS Dulverton	Royal Navy	Hunt-class destroyer	
HMS Eridge	Royal Navy	Hunt-class destroyer	
HMS Hursley	Royal Navy	Hunt-class destroyer	
HMS Hurworth	Royal Navy	Hunt-class destroyer	

==== Convoy MW 12b ====
Convoy MW 12b (Haifa)
Ship	Year	Flag	GRT	Notes
SS Ajax	1931	Merchant Navy	7,540	

==== Escorts, Convoy MW 12b ====
Convoy MW 12b escorts
Ship	Flag	Type	Notes
HMS Cleopatra	Royal Navy	Dido-class cruiser	
HMS Dido	Royal Navy	Dido-class cruiser	
HMS Sikh	Royal Navy	Tribal-class destroyer	
HMS Zulu	Royal Navy	Tribal-class destroyer	
HMS Javelin	Royal Navy	J-class destroyer	
HMS Croome	Royal Navy	Hunt-class destroyer	
HMS Tetcott	Royal Navy	Hunt-class destroyer	

=== Operation MG 4 ===
Rhodes diversion, 13 August 1942
Ship	Flag	Type	Notes
HMS Arethusa	Royal Navy	Arethusa-class cruiser	
HMS Dido	Royal Navy	Dido-class cruiser	
HMS Sikh	Royal Navy	Tribal-class destroyer	
HMS Zulu	Royal Navy	Tribal-class destroyer	
HMS Javelin	Royal Navy	J-class destroyer	
HMS Kelvin	Royal Navy	K-class destroyer	

== Axis order of battle ==
Cruiser divisions
Ship	Flag	Type	Notes
From Messina
Bolzano	Kingdom of Italy	Trento-class cruiser	3rd Cruiser Division
Trieste	Kingdom of Italy	Trento-class cruiser	3rd Cruiser Division
Gorizia	Kingdom of Italy	Zara-class cruiser	3rd Cruiser Division
Grecale	Kingdom of Italy	Maestrale-class destroyer	
Ascari	Kingdom of Italy	Soldati-class destroyer	
Aviere	Kingdom of Italy	Soldati-class destroyer	
Camicia Nera	Kingdom of Italy	Soldati-class destroyer	
Corsaro	Kingdom of Italy	Soldati-class destroyer	
Geniere	Kingdom of Italy	Soldati-class destroyer	
Legionario	Kingdom of Italy	Soldati-class destroyer	
From Caligari
Eugenio di Savoia	Kingdom of Italy	Condottieri-class cruiser	7th Cruiser Division
Muzio Attendolo	Kingdom of Italy	Condottieri-class cruiser	Severely damaged
Raimondo Montecuccoli	Kingdom of Italy	Condottieri-class cruiser	
Maestrale	Kingdom of Italy	Maestrale-class destroyer	
Lanzerotto Malocello	Kingdom of Italy	Navigatori-class destroyer	Minelaying, Sicilian narrows
Vincenzo Gioberti	Kingdom of Italy	Oriani-class destroyer	
Alfredo Oriani	Kingdom of Italy	Oriani-class destroyer	
Fuciliere	Kingdom of Italy	Soldati-class destroyer	
From Palermo
Luigi di Savoia Duca degli Abruzzi	Kingdom of Italy	Condottieri-class cruiser	8th Cruiser Division
Giuseppe Garibaldi	Kingdom of Italy	Condottieri-class cruiser	
Emanuele Filiberto Duca d'Aosta	Kingdom of Italy	Condottieri-class cruiser	

=== Axis submarines ===
Axis submarine patrols
Ship	Flag	Class	Notes
Asteria	Kingdom of Italy	Acciaio-class submarine	Patrol, west of Malta
Avorio	Kingdom of Italy	Acciaio-class submarine	Patrol line, north of Tunisia, Cap Bon
Bronzo	Kingdom of Italy	Acciaio-class submarine	Patrol line, north of Tunisia, Cap Bon
Cobalto	Kingdom of Italy	Acciaio-class submarine	Patrol line, north of Tunisia, Cap Bon, rammed and sunk by Ithuriel
Giada	Kingdom of Italy	Acciaio-class submarine	Patrol line, Algiers to Balearics, damaged by Sunderlands, 12 August
Granito	Kingdom of Italy	Acciaio-class submarine	Patrol line, north of Tunisia, Cap Bon
Volframio	Kingdom of Italy	Acciaio-class submarine	Patrol line, Algiers to Balearics
Alagi	Kingdom of Italy	Adua-class submarine	Patrol line, north of Tunisia, Cap Bon
Ascianghi	Kingdom of Italy	Adua-class submarine	Patrol line, north of Tunisia, Cap Bon
Axum	Kingdom of Italy	Adua-class submarine	Patrol line, north of Tunisia, Cap Bon, torpedoed Cairo, Nigeria, Ohio
Dagabur	Kingdom of Italy	Adua-class submarine	Patrol line, Algiers to Balearics, sunk by Wolverine, 12 August
Dessiè	Kingdom of Italy	Adua-class submarine	Patrol line, north of Tunisia, Cap Bon
Uarsciek	Kingdom of Italy	Adua-class submarine	Patrol line, Algiers to Balearics
Velella	Kingdom of Italy	Argo-class submarine	
Brin	Kingdom of Italy	Brin-class submarine	Patrol line, Algiers to Balearics
Otaria	Kingdom of Italy	Glauco-class submarine	
Dandolo	Kingdom of Italy	Marcello-class submarine	Patrol line, north of Tunisia, Cap Bon
Emo	Kingdom of Italy	Marcello-class submarine	Patrol line, north of Tunisia, Cap Bon
U-73	Kriegsmarine	Type VIIB submarine	Patrol line, Algiers to Balearics
U-205	Kriegsmarine	Type VIIC submarine	
U-333	Kriegsmarine	Type VIIC submarine	Patrol line, Algiers to Balearics

=== Light forces ===
Italian and German motor torpedo boats
Ship	Flag	Type	Notes
MS 16	Kingdom of Italy	Motosilurante	II Squadriglia MS
MS 22	Kingdom of Italy	Motosilurante	II Squadriglia MS
MS 23	Kingdom of Italy	Motosilurante	II Squadriglia MS
MS 25	Kingdom of Italy	Motosilurante	II Squadriglia MS
MS 26	Kingdom of Italy	Motosilurante	II Squadriglia MS
MS 31	Kingdom of Italy	Motosilurante	II Squadriglia MS
MAS 543	Kingdom of Italy	Motoscafo armato silurante	XV Squadriglia MAS
MAS 548	Kingdom of Italy	Motoscafo armato silurante	XV Squadriglia MAS
MAS 549	Kingdom of Italy	Motoscafo armato silurante	XV Squadriglia MAS
MAS 563	Kingdom of Italy	Motoscafo armato silurante	XV Squadriglia MAS
MAS 533	Kingdom of Italy	Motoscafo armato silurante	XVIII Squadriglia MAS, independent minelaying operation
MAS 556	Kingdom of Italy	Motoscafo armato silurante	XVIII Squadriglia MAS
MAS 560	Kingdom of Italy	Motoscafo armato silurante	XVIII Squadriglia MAS
MAS 562	Kingdom of Italy	Motoscafo armato silurante	XVIII Squadriglia MAS
MAS 552	Kingdom of Italy	Motoscafo armato silurante	XX Squadriglia MAS
MAS 554	Kingdom of Italy	Motoscafo armato silurante	XX Squadriglia MAS
MAS 557	Kingdom of Italy	Motoscafo armato silurante	XX Squadriglia MAS
MAS 564	Kingdom of Italy	Motoscafo armato silurante	XX Squadriglia MAS
S 30	Nazi Germany	S 30-class Schnellboot	3rd Flotilla
S 36	Nazi Germany	S 30-class Schnellboot	3rd Flotilla
S 58	Nazi Germany	S 30-class Schnellboot	3rd Flotilla
S 59	Nazi Germany	S 30-class Schnellboot	3rd Flotilla

=== Axis air forces ===
Key
Name	Abbr.	English
Stormo	—	Usually two Gruppi of the same aircraft type
Gruppo	—	Two Squadriglie of multi-engined machines, three Squadriglie of single-engined aircraft
Squadra Aerea	—	Area command reporting to Comando Supremo in Rome
Autonomo	Aut.	Independent Gruppi and Squadriglie under Squadra command
Caccia Terrestre	C.T.	Land fighters
Caccia Marittima	C.M.	Maritime fighters
Bombardamento Terrestre	B.T.	Land bombers
Bombardamento Marittima	B.M.	Floatplanes
Bombardamento a Tuffo	B.a.T.	Dive bombers
Ricognizioni Marittima	R.M.	Reconnaissance Floatplanes
Ricognizione Strategica Terrestre	R.S.T.	Str R, Land Strategic Reconnaissance
Observazioni Aerea	O.A.	Tac R, Tactical reconnaissance
Aerosiluranti	A.S./Sil	Torpedo bomber

==== Aeronautica Sardegna ====
Aeronautica Sardegna
Gruppo	Flag	Squadriglie	Type	No.	Role	Base	Notes
22° Gruppo CT	Kingdom of Italy	359a, 362a	Re.2001	28	Fighter	Elmas	
24° Gruppo CT	Kingdom of Italy	354a	CR.42, G.50	19/16	Fighter	Elmas	
51° Gruppo BT	Kingdom of Italy	212a, 213a	Z.1007	7	Bomber	Villacidro	
65° Gruppo TB	Kingdom of Italy	28a, 124a	Ro 37, Ca.314	24	Torpedo-bomber	Alghero	
89° Gruppo TB	Kingdom of Italy	228a, 229a	SM.84sil	13	Torpedo-bomber	Villacidro	
105° Gruppo TB	Kingdom of Italy	254a, 255a	SM.79sil	15	Torpedo-bomber	Decimomannu	
108° Gruppo TB	Kingdom of Italy	256a, 257a	SM.84sil	12	Torpedo-bomber	Decimomannu	
109° Gruppo TB	Kingdom of Italy	258a, 259a	SM.84sil	12	Torpedo-bomber	Decimomannu	
130° Gruppo TB	Kingdom of Italy	280a, 283a	SM.79sil	13	Torpedo-bomber	Elmas	
153° Gruppo CT	Kingdom of Italy	—	C.202	22	Fighter	—	
160° Gruppo CT	Kingdom of Italy	—	CR.42	16/9	Fighter, Fighter-bomber	—	
Gruppo	Kingdom of Italy	138a	Z.501, Ro.43	7/1	Reconnaissance	Olbia	
Gruppo	Kingdom of Italy	146a	Z.506	12	Recce, ASR	Elmas	
Gruppo RSM	Kingdom of Italy	188a	Z501	3	Recce, ASR	Elmas	
Gruppo ASR	Kingdom of Italy	287a	Z.506	7	Recce, ASR	Elmas	
Gruppo ASR	Kingdom of Italy	613a	SM 66C, Z.506S	5/1	ASR	Elmas	
— CN	Kingdom of Italy	Gruppo	CR.42, G.50	—	Night fighter	Elmas	

==== Fliegerkorps II ====
II. Fliegerkorps (Sardinia)
Unit	Flag	Type	No.	Role	Base	Notes
I(F) 122	Luftwaffe	Ju 88, Bf 109F	7	Long-range reconnaissance	Elmas/Catania	
I/JG 77	Luftwaffe	Bf 109F	13	Fighter	Elmas	

=== Axis air forces (Sicily) ===
==== Aeronautica Sicila ====
Aeronautica Sicila
Gruppo	Flag	Sqe	Type	No.	Role	Base
2°	Kingdom of Italy	150a, 152a, 358a	Re.2001	10	Fighter	Castelvetrano
4°	Kingdom of Italy	14a, 15a	SM.84	15	Bomber	Castelvetrano
7°	Kingdom of Italy	76a	CR.42, C.200, C.202	3/5/1	Fighter	Pantelleria
16°	Kingdom of Italy	169a	C.200	7	Fighter	Reggio Calabria
20°	Kingdom of Italy	151a, 352a, 353a	C.202	6	Fighter	Gela
25°	Kingdom of Italy	8a, 9a	SM.84	7	Bomber	Castelvetrano
26°	Kingdom of Italy	11a, 13a	Z.1007	5	Bomber	Sicilia
29°	Kingdom of Italy	62a, 63a	Z.1007	8	Bomber	Chinisia
30°	Kingdom of Italy	55a, 56a	SM.79	10	Anti-shipping	Sciacca
32°	Kingdom of Italy	57a, 58a	SM.79	6	Anti-shipping	Boccadifalco
33°	Kingdom of Italy	59a, 60a	Z.1007	9	Anti-shipping	Chinisia
83°	Kingdom of Italy	170a, 184a	RS.14	16	Recce, torpedo-bomber, ASR	Augusta
83°	Kingdom of Italy	186a, 189a	Z.501, Z.506	12/9	Recce, torpedo-bomber, ASR	Augusta
85°	Kingdom of Italy	144a	RS14, Ro.43	2/1	Recce, ASR	Stagnone
85°	Kingdom of Italy	197a	Z.501, Z.506	10/2	Recce, ASR	Stagnone
88°	Kingdom of Italy	264a, 265a	BR.20	10	Night bomber	Gerbini
102°	Kingdom of Italy	209a, 239a	Ju 87R	15	Dive-bomber	Castelvetrano
132°	Kingdom of Italy	278a, 281a	SM.79sil	15	Torpedo-bomber	Pantelleria
155°	Kingdom of Italy	351a, 360, 378a	C.202	21	Fighter	Gela
Autonomo	Kingdom of Italy	173a	CR.25	6	Torpedo-bomber	Boccadifalco
Autonomo	Kingdom of Italy	377a	Re.2000	6	Fighter	Pantelleria
Autonomo	Kingdom of Italy	612a	Z.506soc	5	ASR	Stagnone
Intercettore	Kingdom of Italy	—	CR.42	8	Night-fighter	Sciacca
Fotografica	Kingdom of Italy	—	C.202	3	Recce	Reggio Calabria

==== Fliegerkorps II ====
Fliegerkorps II, Sicily (Note: Serviceable aircraft only.)
Unit	Flag	Type	No.	Role	Base	Notes
Stab I(F) 122	Luftwaffe	Ju 88	2	Long-range reconnaissance	Trapani	Staff flight
I.(F) 122	Luftwaffe	Ju 88, Bf 109F	7	Long-range reconnaissance	Catania/Elmas	
2.(F) 122	Luftwaffe	Ju 88	5	Long-range reconnaissance	Sicily	
Stab KG 54	Luftwaffe	Ju 88	2	Medium bomber	Catania	Staff flight
KGr 606	Luftwaffe	Ju 88	20	Medium bomber	Catania	
KGr 806	Luftwaffe	Ju 88	21	Medium bomber	Catania	
Stab KG 77	Luftwaffe	Ju 88	3	Medium bomber	Comiso, Gerbini	Staff flight
II/KG 77	Luftwaffe	Ju 88	13	Medium bomber	Comiso, Gerbini	
III/KG 77	Luftwaffe	Ju 88	15	Medium bomber	Comiso, Gerbini	
LG 1	Luftwaffe	Ju 88-A4/Trop	28	Medium bomber	Gerbini	
I/StG 3	Luftwaffe	Ju 87 D	26	Dive bomber	Trapani	
8/ZG 26	Luftwaffe	Bf 110 C4	4	Heavy fighter	ex. Kastelli, Crete	
1/NJG 2	Luftwaffe	Bf 110	12	Night fighter	Sicily	
Stab JG 53	Luftwaffe	Bf 109G	3	Fighter	Sicily, Pantelleria	Staff flight
II/JG 53	Luftwaffe	Bf 109G	15	Fighter	Sicily	
II/KG 26	Luftwaffe	He 111-H6	6	Torpedo-bomber	Gerbini	
I/KG 54	Luftwaffe	Ju 88	28	Torpedo-bomber	Gerbini, Pantelleria	

== Aftermath ==
=== Analysis ===
German reports on 17 August claimed that all the tankers in the recent Mediterranean convoy had been sunk and none of the transports had reached their destination (assumed to be Egypt). The Allies had lost thirteen vessels, including nine merchantmen, one aircraft carrier (Eagle), two cruisers (Manchester and Cairo) and a destroyer (Foresight) but the Royal Navy and the Merchant Navy had saved Malta. The arrival of about 29,000 long tons (32,000 short tons) of general cargo, together with petrol, oil fuel, kerosene and diesel fuel, was enough to give the island about ten weeks' supply beyond the few weeks that the existing stocks would last. Axis propaganda broadcasts made extravagant claims but a Kriegsmarine report noted the incomplete and contradictory evidence, allowing only a provisional conclusion. The arrival of four merchant ships and a tanker was unsatisfactory, because the revival of Malta as an offensive base would affect Axis supply routes in what might be the "decisive phase of the struggle for North Africa". Supermarina reached the same conclusion and Generale Giuseppe Santoro, deputy chief of staff of the Regia Aeronautica, wrote that the British had achieved a strategic success by bringing Malta back into action "in the final phase of the struggle in Egypt".

In August, with Malta still besieged, 35 per cent of Axis convoy shipping to North Africa was lost. Later that year, Admiral Eberhard Weichold summed up the Kriegsmarine view,

.... To the continental observer, the British losses seemed to represent a big victory for the Axis, but in reality the facts were quite different, since it had not been possible to prevent a British force, among which were five merchant vessels, from reaching Valetta.... Thanks to these new supplies Malta was now capable of fighting for several weeks, or, at a pinch, for several months. The main issue, the danger of air attack on the supply route to North Africa, remained. To achieve this objective no price was too high, and from this point of view the British operation, in spite of all the losses, was not a defeat, but a strategical failure of the first order by the Axis, the repercussions of which will one day be felt...

— Weichold

In 1994, James Sadkovich wrote that Operation Pedestal was a tactical disaster for the British and that it was of a magnitude comparable to the German attack on Convoy PQ 17 about a month earlier. In 2000, Richard Woodman called Operation Pedestal a strategic victory, raising the morale of the people and garrison of Malta, averting famine and an inevitable surrender. In 2002, Giorgio Giorgerini wrote that the operation was an Italian success; Italian submarines had adopted more offensive tactics and sunk a cruiser and two merchantmen, damaged two cruisers and the tanker Ohio. In 2002, Jack Greene and Alessandro Massignani called the convoy operation the last Axis victory in the Mediterranean but that it was a tactical not a strategic success. The arrival of Ohio justified the convoy despite the loss of nine of the merchant ships (one in Valletta harbour). Axis shipping had been suspended during the operation, partly because the transport Ogaden had been sunk off Derna on 12 August, by HMS Porpoise and after Ohio arrived, Axis ships had to make longer journeys. On 15 August, Lerici was also sunk by Porpoise and on 17 August, Pilo was sunk by aircraft and the tanker Pozarica was sunk on 21 August.

=== Casualties ===
In 2003, Ian Malcolm listed 160 men killed on Eagle, 132 on Manchester, 52 on Nigeria, 50 on Indomitable, 24 on Cairo, five on Foresight and three men on Kenya. Merchant Navy casualties were 83 on Waimarama, eighteen on Clan Ferguson, seven on Glenorchy, five on Melbourne Star, four on Santa Elisa, one each on Deucalion, Ohio and Brisbane Star. Ohio never sailed again and the British lost the carrier Eagle, the cruisers Manchester and Cairo and the destroyer Foresight. The carrier Indomitable, the cruisers Nigeria and Kenya and three destroyers were damaged and under repair for some time. On the Axis side, the Italian cruisers Bolzano and Muzio Attendolo were damaged and were not operational for the rest of the war, the Italian submarines Cobalto and Dagabur were sunk, the Italian submarine Giada and the German E-Boat S 58 were damaged.

Fliegerkorps II sent 650 sorties against Pedestal from 11 to 14 August and claimed twelve aircraft shot down for eighteen losses. Total Axis losses were 62 aircraft, 42 Italian and 19 German, including losses on the ground and those shot down by their own side. Royal Navy gunners and FAA fighters claimed 74 aircraft shot down, against post-war data that they destroyed 42 Axis aircraft, 26 from the Regia Aeronautica and 16 Luftwaffe aircraft. The FAA lost 13 aircraft on operations and 16 Sea Hurricanes when Eagle was sunk, the RAF lost a Beaufighter, five Spitfires and a Sunderland was shot down by Giada. The Allies could not risk such losses again and another large convoy to Malta was not attempted until November 1942, when the re-capture of airfields in Egypt and Libya after the Second Battle of El Alamein made it much easier to provide land-based air cover. (Note: In 1956, the official history gave FAA losses of 13 aircraft in action and 16 when Eagle was sunk, the RAF lost five aircraft and 35 Axis aircraft were shot down, including losses over Malta.)

== See also ==
- List of orders of battle

== Bibliography ==
- Brown, David (1995) [1990]. Warship Losses of World War Two (pbk. repr. ed.). London: Arms and Armour Press. ISBN 0-85409-278-1.
- Dunning, Chris (1998). Courage Alone: The Italian Air Force 1940–1943. Aldershot: Hikoki. ISBN 1-902109-02-3.
- Giorgerini, Giorgio (2002). Uomini sul fondo: storia del sommergibilismo italiano dalle origini a oggi [Men on the Bottom: The Story of the Italian Submarine from Past to Present] (in Italian). Milano: Mondadori. ISBN 978-88-04-50537-2.
- Greene, J.; Massignani, A. (2002) [1998]. The Naval War in the Mediterranean 1940–1943 (pbk. ed.). Rochester: Chatham. ISBN 978-1-86176-190-3.
- Hague, A. (2000). The Allied Convoy System 1939–1945: Its Organization, Defence and Operation. London: Chatham. ISBN 1-86176-147-3.
- Jordan, Roger W. (2006) [1999]. The World's Merchant Fleets 1939: The Particulars and Wartime Fates of 6,000 Ships (2nd ed.). London: Chatham/Lionel Leventhal. ISBN 978-1-86176-293-1.
- Malcolm, Ian (2013). Shipping Company Losses of the Second World War. Stroud: The History Press. ISBN 978-0-7509-5371-9.
- Martienssen, A. K. (1949). Hitler and his Admirals. New York: E. P. Dutton. OCLC 562130.
- Playfair, Major-General I. S. O.; Flynn, Captain F. C. RN; Molony, Brigadier C. J. C.; Gleave, Group Captain T. P. (2004) [1960]. Butler, Sir James (ed.). The Mediterranean and Middle East: British Fortunes Reach Their Lowest Ebb (September 1941 to September 1942). History of the Second World War, United Kingdom Military Series. Vol. III (pbk. facs, repr Naval & Military Press, Uckfield ed.). London: HMSO. ISBN 978-1-84574-067-2.
- Rohwer, Jürgen; Hümmelchen, Gerhard (2005) [1972]. Chronology of the War at Sea, 1939–1945: The Naval History of World War Two (3rd rev. ed.). London: Chatham. ISBN 1-86176-257-7.
- Roskill, S. W. (1957) [1954]. Butler, J. R. M. (ed.). The Defensive. History of the Second World War United Kingdom Military Series: The War at Sea 1939–1945. Vol. I (4th impr. ed.). London: HMSO. OCLC 881709135. Archived from the original on 27 February 2022 – via Hyperwar Foundation.
- Roskill, S. W. (1956). The Period of Balance. History of the Second World War United Kingdom Military Series: The War at Sea 1939–1945. Vol. II. London: HMSO. OCLC 174453986. Archived from the original on 6 March 2014 – via Hyperwar Foundation.
- Sadkovich, James (1994). The Italian Navy in World War II. Westport, CN: Greenwood Press. ISBN 978-0-313-28797-8.
- Shores, Christopher; Cull, Brian; Malizia, Nicola (1987). Malta: The Hurricane Years 1940–41. London: Grub Street. ISBN 0-948817-06-2.
- Smith, Peter C. (1987). Pedestal: The Malta convoy of August 1942 (2nd rev. exp. ed.). London: William Kimber. ISBN 0-7183-0632-5.
- Woodman, Richard (2003). Malta Convoys, 1940–1943. John Murray. ISBN 978-0-7195-6408-6.
