= Cairo (disambiguation) =

Cairo is the capital city of Egypt.

Cairo may also refer to:

== Places ==
=== United States ===
- Cairo, Georgia, a city
- Cairo, Illinois, a city
- Cairo Precinct, Alexander County, Illinois
- Cairo, Indiana, an unincorporated community
- Cairo, Kansas, an unincorporated community
- Cairo Township, Renville County, Minnesota
- Cairo, Missouri, a village
- Cairo, Nebraska, a village
- Cairo, New York, a town
  - Cairo (CDP), New York, a census-designated place in the town
- Cairo, Ohio, a village
- Cairo, Stark County, Ohio, an unincorporated community
- Cairo, Oklahoma, an unincorporated community
- Cairo, Oregon, an unincorporated community
- Cairo, Crockett County, Tennessee, an unincorporated community
- Cairo, Sumner County, Tennessee, an unincorporated community
- Cairo, West Virginia, a town

=== Elsewhere ===
- Cairo, a community in the township of Dawn-Euphemia, Ontario, Canada
- Cairo Governorate, Egypt
- Cairo Montenotte, a commune in the Liguria region of Italy
- Cape Cairo, Nunavut, Canada
- El Cairo, Colombia, a town and municipality
- Monte Cairo, a mountain in the Lazio region of Italy

== People ==
- Cairo (surname)
- Cairo Lima (born 1976), Brazilian footballer and manager
- Cairo Santos (born 1991), American football placekicker

== Ships ==
- HMS Cairo (D87), a 1918 ship in the Royal Navy
- USS Cairo (1861), an ironclad river gunboat in the United States Navy during the 19th century
- RMS Cairo, original name of HMT Royal Edward, a passenger ship sunk during the First World War
- German auxiliary cruiser Stier, originally the freighter Cairo

== Arts and entertainment ==
- Cairo (1942 film), an American film starring Jeanette MacDonald
- Cairo (1963 film), an American film starring George Sanders
- Cairo (comics), a 2007 graphic novel by G. Willow Wilson and M.K. Perker
- Cairo (novel), a 2013 novel by Chris Womersley
- Cairo Trilogy, a 1956 trilogy of novels written by Naguib Mahfouz
- Joel Cairo, a major character in the novel The Maltese Falcon and its film adaptations
- "Cairo" (The Leftovers), the eighth episode of the HBO series The Leftovers
- "Cairo", a song by Joyella Blade, 1978, later recorded by Bananarama (as the B-side to "Cruel Summer") and by Amazulu
- "Cairo", a song by Andy Partridge from Take Away / The Lure of Salvage, 1980
- "Cairo" (Karol G and Ovy on the Drums song), 2022

== Businesses ==
- Cairo International Bank, a commercial bank in Uganda
- Cairo Aviation, a charter airline based in Cairo, Egypt
- Air Cairo, a low fare airline based in Cairo, Egypt

== Computing ==
- Cairo (dingbat font), a bitmap dingbat font on early Macintosh computers
- Cairo (graphics), a free software vector graphics library
- Cairo (operating system), the internal Microsoft code name for a 1990s technology project

== Other uses ==
- Cairo (dog), a US Navy SEAL war dog who was part of the mission to kill Osama bin Laden
- The Cairo, an apartment building in Washington, D.C.
- Cairo Gang, a group of 18 MI5 agents sent to Dublin during the Anglo-Irish War
- Cairo Road, an important thoroughfare in Lusaka, Zambia
- Responsibility assignment matrix § CAIRO, an acronym for clarifying responsibilities for a process or a project
- Cairo Channel, an Egyptian regional television channel
- Gran Cairo, a quasi-mythified, former Maya settlement

== See also ==
- Cairo poets, a literary group based in Cairo, Egypt, during World War II
- Cairo pentagonal tiling, a geometrical pattern
- Kairo (disambiguation)
- Chi Rho, an ancient Christian symbol
- Chiro (disambiguation)
- Clairo (born 1998), American singer-songwriter
