= Air raid on Bari =

1943 attack by German bombers on Allied forces and shipping in Bari, Italy, during WWII

- Part of the Italian campaign of World War II
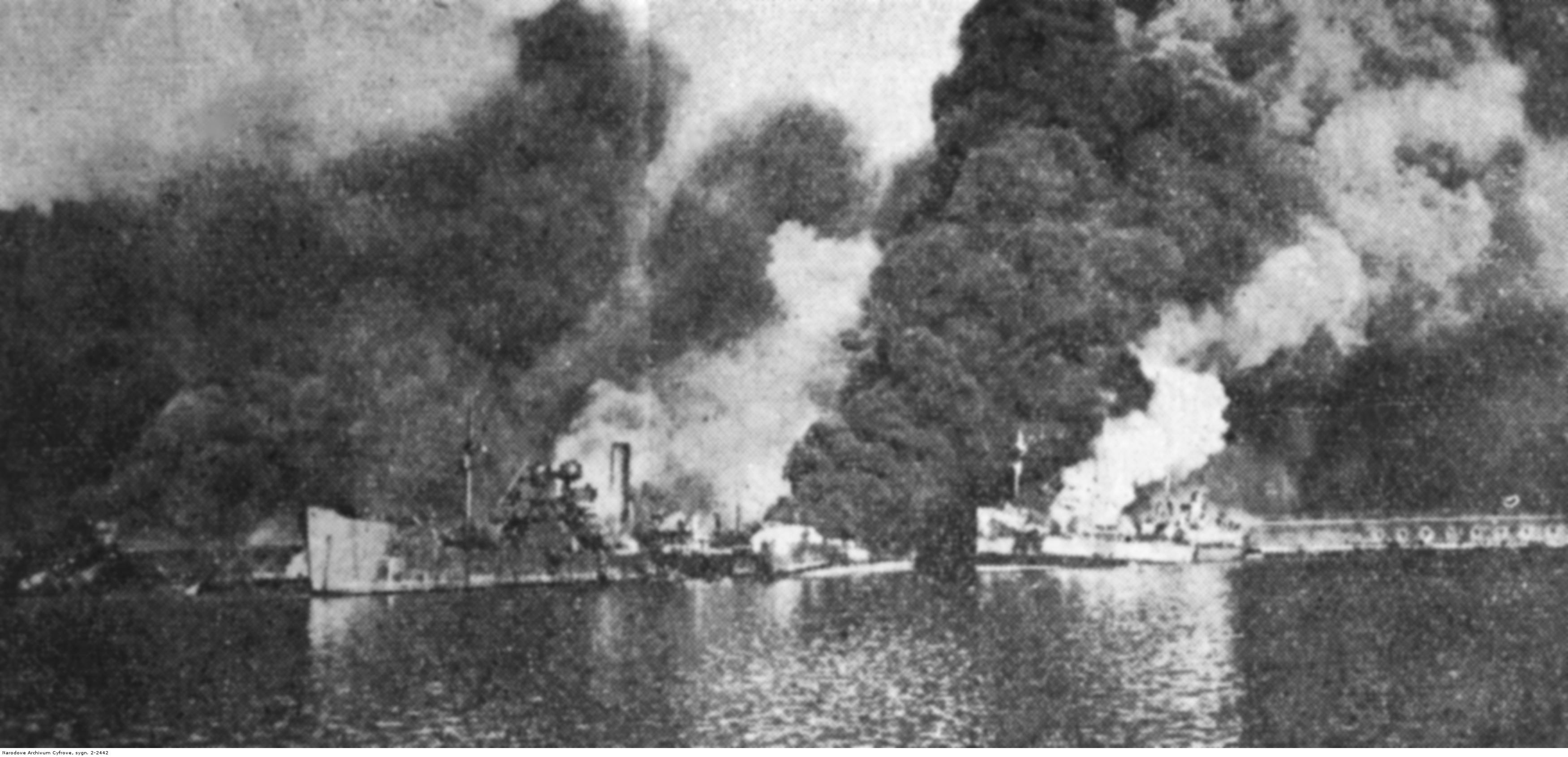
- Allied ships burning during the German attack on Bari
Date	2 December 1943
Location	Bari, Italy 41°07′31″N 16°52′0″E
Result	German victory

Belligerents
Germany	United Kingdom; United States; Kingdom of Italy

Commanders and leaders
(Nazi Germany) Albert Kesselring (Nazi Germany) Wolfram von Richthofen	(United Kingdom) Harold Alexander (United Kingdom) Arthur Coningham

Strength
105 Junkers Ju 88 A-4 bombers	

Casualties and losses
One aircraft destroyed	29 ships sunk harbour extensively damaged 1,000 military and merchant marine personnel killed 1,000 civilians killed
- Bari, in the Apulia region of Italy on the Adriatic Sea

The air raid on Bari (German: Luftangriff auf den Hafen von Bari, Italian: Bombardamento di Bari) was an air attack by German bombers on Allied forces and shipping in Bari, Italy, on 2 December 1943, during World War II. 105 German Junkers Ju 88 bombers of Luftflotte 2 surprised the port's defenders and bombed shipping and personnel operating in support of the Allied Italian Campaign, sinking 27 cargo and transport ships, as well as a schooner, in Bari harbour.

The attack lasted a little more than an hour and put the port out of action until February 1944. The release of mustard gas from one of the wrecked cargo ships added to the loss of life. The British and US governments covered up the presence of mustard gas and its effects on victims of the raid.

== Background ==
In early September 1943, coinciding with the Allied invasion of Italy, the Kingdom of Italy surrendered to the Allies in the Armistice of Cassibile and changed sides, but the breakaway Italian Social Republic in central and northern Italy continued the war on the Axis side. On 11 September 1943, the port of Bari in southern Italy was taken unopposed by the British 1st Airborne Division. The port was used by the Allies to land ammunition, supplies and provisions from ships at the port for Allied forces advancing towards Rome and to push German forces out of the Italian peninsula.

Bari had inadequate air defences; no Royal Air Force (RAF) fighter aircraft squadrons were based there, and fighters within range were assigned to escort or offensive duties, not port defence. Ground defences were equally ineffective.

Little thought was given to the possibility of a German air raid on Bari, because it was believed that the Luftwaffe in Italy was stretched too thin to mount a serious attack. On the afternoon of 2 December 1943, Air Marshal Sir Arthur Coningham, commander of the Northwest African Tactical Air Force, held a press conference in Bari where he stated that the Germans had lost the air war. "I would consider it as a personal insult if the enemy should send so much as one plane over the city". That was despite the fact that German air raids by KG 54, KG 76, and other units, had hit the port area of Naples four times in the previous month, and attacked other Mediterranean targets.

Thirty ships of American, British, Polish, Norwegian and Dutch registry were in Bari Harbour on 2 December. The adjoining port city held a civilian population of 250,000. The port was lit on the night of the raid to expedite the unloading of supplies for the Battle of Monte Cassino and was working at full capacity.

== Raid ==
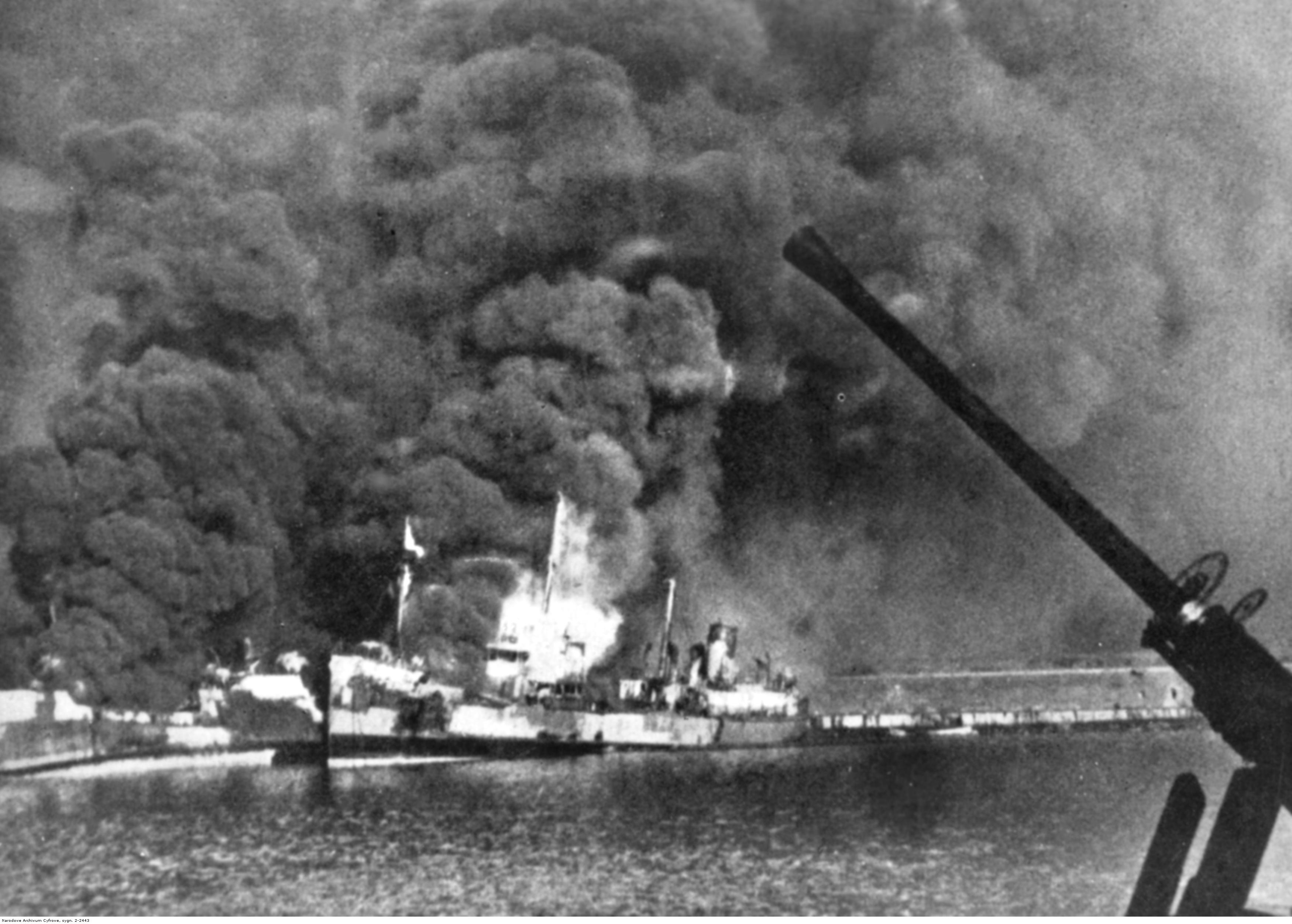
Allied ships burning during the raid

On the afternoon of 2 December, Luftwaffe pilot Werner Hahn made a reconnaissance flight over Bari in an Me 210. His report reached Generalfeldmarschall Wolfram von Richthofen—who commanded Luftflotte 2. With the support of Albert Kesselring, Richthofen ordered a raid; Kesselring and his staff had earlier considered Allied airfields at Foggia as targets but the Luftwaffe lacked the resources for such an attack. Richthofen had suggested Bari as an alternative. Richthofen believed that crippling the port might slow the advance of the British Eighth Army and told Kesselring that the only aircraft available were his Junkers Ju 88A-4 bombers. Richthofen thought that a raid by 150 Ju 88s might be possible but only 105 bombers were available, some from KG 54. Most of the aeroplanes were to fly from Italian airfields but Richthofen wanted to use a few from Yugoslavia in the hope that the Allies might be fooled into thinking that the mission originated from there and misdirect any retaliatory strikes. The Ju 88 pilots were ordered to fly east to the Adriatic Sea, then swing south and west, since it was thought that the Allied forces would expect any attack to come from the north.

The attack opened at 19:25, when two or three German aircraft circled the harbour at 10,000 ft (3,000 m) dropping Düppel (foil strips) to confuse Allied radar. They also dropped flares, which were not needed due to the harbour being well illuminated. The German bomber force surprised the defenders and was able to bomb the harbour with great accuracy. Hits on two ammunition ships caused explosions which shattered windows 7 mi (11 km) away. A bulk petrol pipeline on a quay was severed and the gushing fuel ignited. A sheet of burning fuel spread over much of the harbour, engulfing undamaged ships.

Twenty-eight merchant ships laden with more than 34,000 short tons (31,000 t) of cargo were sunk or destroyed; three ships carrying a further 7,500 short tons (6,800 t) were later salvaged. Twelve more ships were damaged. The port was closed for three weeks and was only restored to full operation in February 1944. All Bari-based submarines were undamaged, their tough exteriors able to withstand the German attack.

Ships damaged in the raid
Name	Flag	Type	GRT or Displacement	Status	Notes
Ardito	(Kingdom of Italy)		3,732 GRT	Sunk	
Argo	(Kingdom of Italy)	Coaster	526 GRT	Damaged	
Aube	(France)	Cargo ship	1,055 GRT	Sunk	
Barletta	(Kingdom of Italy)	Auxiliary cruiser	1,975 GRT	Sunk	Forty-four crew killed. Four men from the militarized crew killed in action and four men were wounded. The military crew had twenty-two men killed in action, fourteen missing in action and forty wounded. Raised in 1948–1949 and repaired.
HMS Bicester	(United Kingdom)	Hunt-class destroyer	1,050 GRT	Damaged	
Bollsta	(Norway)	Cargo ship	1,832 GRT	Sunk	Raised in 1948, repaired and returned to service as Stefano M.
Brittany Coast	(United Kingdom)	Cargo ship	1,389 GRT	Damaged	
Cassala	(Kingdom of Italy)	Cargo ship	1,797 GRT	Total loss	
Corfu	(Kingdom of Italy)	Cargo ship	1,409 GRT	Total loss	
Crista	(United Kingdom)	Cargo ship	1,389 GRT	Damaged	
Dagö	(Latvia)	Cargo ship	1,996 GRT	Damaged	
Devon Coast	(United Kingdom)	Coaster	646 GRT	Sunk	
Fort Athabaska	(United Kingdom)	Cargo ship (Fort class)	7,132 GRT	Sunk	
Fort Lajoie	(United Kingdom)	Cargo ship (Fort class)	7,134 GRT	Sunk	
Frosinone	(Kingdom of Italy)	Cargo ship	5,202 GRT	Sunk	
Genespesca II	(Kingdom of Italy)	Cargo ship	1,628 GRT	Sunk	
Goggiam	(Kingdom of Italy)	Cargo ship	1,934 GRT	Total loss	
Grace Abbott	(United States)	Liberty ship	7,191 GRT	Damaged	
Inaffondabile	(Kingdom of Italy)	Schooner	Unknown	Sunk	
John Bascom	(United States)	Liberty ship	7,176 GRT	Sunk	Four crewmen, ten armed guards killed. Wreck scrapped in 1948.
John Harvey	(United States)	Liberty ship	7,177 GRT	Sunk	Cargo of mustard gas bombs. Thirty-six crewmen, ten soldiers, twenty armed guards killed. Wreck scrapped in 1948.
John L. Motley	(United States)	Liberty ship	7,176 GRT	Sunk	Cargo of ammunition. Thirty-six crewmen, Twenty-four armed guards killed.
John M. Schofield	(United States)	Liberty ship	7,181 GRT	Damaged	
Joseph Wheeler	(United States)	Liberty ship	7,176 GRT	Sunk	Twenty-six crewmen, fifteen armed guards killed. Wreck scrapped in 1948.
Lars Kruse	(United Kingdom)	Cargo ship	1,807 GRT	Sunk	Nineteen crew killed.
Lom	(Norway)	Cargo ship	1,268 GRT	Sunk	Four crew killed.
Luciano Orlando	(Kingdom of Italy)	Cargo ship	Unknown	Sunk	
Lwów	Poland	Cargo ship	1,409 GRT	Sunk	
Lyman Abbott	(United States)	Liberty ship	7,176 GRT	Damaged	
MB 10	(Kingdom of Italy)	Armed motor boat	13 tons displacement	Sunk	
Norlom	(Norway)	Cargo ship	6,326 GRT	Sunk	Six crew killed. Refloated November 1946, scrapped 1947.
Odysseus	(Netherlands)	Cargo ship	1,057 GRT	Damaged	
Porto Pisano	(Kingdom of Italy)	Coaster	226 GRT	Sunk	
Puck	(Poland)	Cargo ship	1,065 GRT	Sunk	
Samuel J. Tilden	(United States)	Liberty ship	7,176 GRT	Sunk	Ten crewmen, fourteen US soldiers, three British soldiers killed. Wreck scrapped in 1948.
Testbank	(United Kingdom)	Cargo ship	5,083 GRT	Sunk	Seventy crew killed.
Vest	(Norway)	Cargo ship	5,074 GRT	Damaged	
HMS Vienna	(United Kingdom)	Depot ship	4,227 GRT	Damaged	
Volodda	(Kingdom of Italy)	Cargo ship	4,673 GRT	Sunk	
HMS Zetland	(United Kingdom)	Hunt-class destroyer	1,050 GRT	Damaged	

== John Harvey ==
One of the destroyed vessels—the US Liberty ship John Harvey—had been carrying a secret cargo of 2000 M47A1 mustard gas bombs, each holding 60–70 lb (27–32 kg) of the agent. According to Royal Navy historian Stephen Roskill, the cargo had been sent to Europe for potential retaliatory use if Germany carried out its alleged threat to use chemical warfare in Italy. The destruction of John Harvey caused liquid sulfur mustard from the bombs to spill into waters already contaminated by oil from the other damaged vessels. The many sailors who had abandoned their ships into the water became covered with the oily mixture, which provided an ideal solvent for the sulfur mustard. Some mustard evaporated and mingled with the clouds of smoke and flame. The wounded were pulled from the water and sent to medical facilities whose personnel were unaware of the mustard gas. Medical staff focused on personnel with blast or fire injuries and little attention was given to those merely covered with oil. Many injuries caused by prolonged exposure to low concentrations of mustard might have been reduced by bathing or a change of clothes.

Within a day, the first symptoms of mustard poisoning had appeared in 628 patients and medical staff, including blindness and chemical burns. That puzzling development was further complicated by the arrival of hundreds of Italian civilians also seeking treatment, who had been poisoned by a cloud of sulfur mustard vapor that had blown over the city when some of John Harvey's cargo exploded. As the medical crisis worsened, little information was available about what was causing the symptoms, because the US military command wanted to keep the presence of chemical munitions secret from the Germans. Nearly all crewmen of John Harvey had been killed, and were unavailable to explain the cause of the "garlic-like" odour noted by rescue personnel.

Informed about the mysterious symptoms, Deputy Surgeon General Fred Blesse sent for Lieutenant Colonel Stewart Francis Alexander, an expert in chemical warfare. Carefully tallying the locations of the victims at the time of the attack, Alexander traced the epicenter to John Harvey, and confirmed mustard gas as the responsible agent when he located a fragment of the casing of a US M47A1 bomb.

By the end of the month, 83 of the 628 hospitalised military victims had died. The number of civilian casualties, thought to have been even greater, could not be accurately gauged since most had left the city to seek shelter with relatives.

An additional cause of contamination with mustard is suggested by George Southern, the only survivor of the raid to have written about it. The huge explosion of John Harvey, possibly simultaneously with another ammunition ship, sent large amounts of oily water mixed with mustard into the air, which fell down like rain on men who were on deck at the time. That affected the crews of the Hunt-class destroyers HMS Zetland and HMS Bicester. Both ships were damaged by the force of the blast and had taken casualties. After moving the destroyers away from burning ships and towing the tanker La Drome away from the fires, the ships received orders to sail for Taranto. They threaded their way past burning wrecks, with the flotilla leader, Bicester having to follow Zetland, because her navigation equipment was damaged. Some survivors were picked up from the water in the harbour entrance by Bicester. When dawn broke, it became clear that the magnetic and gyro compasses had acquired large errors, requiring a considerable course correction. Symptoms of mustard gas poisoning then began to appear. By the time they reached Taranto, none of Bicester's officers could see well enough to navigate the ship into harbour, so assistance had to be sought from the shore.

=== Cover-up ===
A member of Allied Supreme Commander General Dwight D. Eisenhower's medical staff, Stewart F. Alexander, was dispatched to Bari following the raid. Alexander had trained at the Army's Edgewood Arsenal in Maryland, and was familiar with some of the effects of mustard gas. Although he was not informed of the cargo carried by John Harvey, and most victims suffered atypical symptoms caused by exposure to mustard diluted in water and oil (as opposed to airborne), Alexander rapidly concluded that mustard gas was present. Although he could not get any acknowledgement from the chain of command, Alexander convinced medics to treat patients for mustard gas exposure and saved many lives as a result. He also preserved many tissue samples from autopsied victims at Bari. After World War II, those samples resulted in the development of an early form of chemotherapy based on mustard, mustine.

Allied High Command suppressed news of the presence of mustard gas, in case the Germans believed that the Allies were preparing to use chemical weapons, fearing it might provoke them into pre-emptive use. The presence of multiple witnesses caused a re-evaluation of this stance and in February 1944, the US Chiefs of Staff issued a statement admitting to the accident and emphasizing that the US had no intention of using chemical weapons except in the case of retaliation. Eisenhower approved Alexander's report. Winston Churchill, however, ordered all British documents to be purged. Mustard gas deaths were described as "burns due to enemy action".

US records of the attack were declassified in 1959, but the episode remained obscure until 1967 when author Glenn B. Infield published the book Disaster at Bari. In 1986, the British government admitted to survivors of the Bari raid that they had been exposed to poison gas and amended their pension payments. In 1988, through the efforts of Nick T. Spark and US Senators Dennis DeConcini and Bill Bradley, Alexander received recognition from the Surgeon General of the United States Army for his actions in the aftermath of the Bari disaster. Alexander's information contributed to Cornelius P. Rhoads' chemotherapy for cancer and Alexander turned down Rhoads' offer to work at the Sloan Kettering Institute.

In his autobiographical work Destroyer Captain, published in 1975 by William Kimber & Co., Roger Hill describes refuelling HMS Grenville in Bari shortly after the attack. He describes the damage done and details how a shipload of mustard gas came to be in the harbour because of intelligence reports which he viewed as "incredible".

== Aftermath ==
An inquiry exonerated Arthur Coningham of negligence in defending the port but found that the absence of previous air attacks had led to complacency.

== See also ==
- List of accidents and incidents involving transport or storage of ammunition
- SS Charles Henderson
