= Kairos (disambiguation) =

Kairos is the ancient Greek concept of a propitious time for action.

Kairos may also refer to:

== Groups, organizations, companies ==
- Kairos HQ, formerly the Kairos Society, American company
- Kairos (record label), an Austrian record label specialising in contemporary classical music
- Kairos Canada: Canadian Ecumenical Justice Initiatives, a coalition which united ten former social justice coalitions, based in Toronto
- Kairos Prison Ministry, an interdenominational Christian ministry
- Kairos Palestine, an organization involved with the Kairos Palestine document

== Literature ==
- Kairos Document, a theological document against Apartheid in South Africa
- Kairos (journal), a scholarly journal about computers and writing
- Kairos, a series of books by Madeleine L'Engle, beginning with A Wrinkle in Time (1962)
- Kairos (novel), a 2021 novel by Jenny Erpenbeck

== Music ==
- Kairos (album), a 2011 album by Sepultura, or the title track
- Kairos, a 2002 EP by This Day Forward

== Other ==
- Space One KAIROS, a Japanese rocket manufactured and launched by Space One
- KAIROS Prize, a cultural prize awarded by the Alfred Toepfer Stiftung FVS
- Kairos (TV series), a 2020 South Korean television series
- Kairos, a fictional planet, setting of episode "The Harvest of Kairos" (1980) from series 3 of Blake's 7

== See also ==
- Kairos I, a transport ship
- MT Kairos, a crude oil tanker
- Kairo (disambiguation)
- Cairo (disambiguation)
