= HMS Derwent (L83) =

Destroyer of the Royal Navy

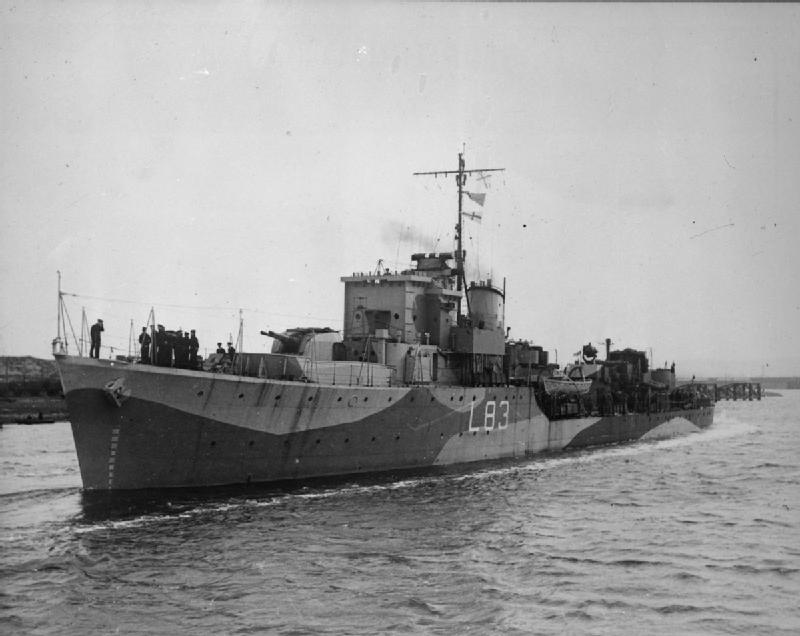
- HMS Derwent (L83)

History

United Kingdom
- Name: Derwent
- Ordered: 4 July 1940
- Builder: Vickers-Armstrongs, Barrow-in-Furness
- Laid down: 29 December 1940
- Launched: 22 August 1941
- Commissioned: 24 April 1942
- Identification: Pennant number: L83
- Honours and awards: Atlantic 1942; Malta Convoys 1942
- Fate: Scrapped in 1947
- Badge: On a Field Blue, a stirrup Gold, over a rose White and two wings also White

General characteristics
- Class & type: Hunt-class destroyer
- Displacement: 1,050 long tons (1,067 t) standard; 1,435 long tons (1,458 t) full load
- Length: 280 ft (85 m)
- Beam: 33 ft 4 in (10.16 m)
- Draught: 8 ft 3 in (2.51 m)
- Installed power: 2 × Admiralty three-drum boilers; 19,000 shp (14,000 kW)
- Propulsion: 2 × Parsons geared turbines; 2 × Shafts
- Speed: 27 kn (50 km/h; 31 mph)
- Range: 2,350 nmi (4,350 km) at 20 kn (37 km/h; 23 mph)
- Complement: 168
- Armament: 4 × QF 4 in (102 mm) Mark XVI on twin mounts Mk. XIX; 4 × QF 2 pdr Mk. VIII on quad mount MK.VII; 2 × 20 mm (0.79 in) Oerlikon cannons on single mounts P Mk. III; 2 × tubes for 21 in (533 mm) torpedoes; 110 depth charges, 4 throwers, 2 racks

HMS Derwent was a Hunt-class Type III escort destroyer of the Royal Navy. She was built by Vickers-Armstrongs, in Barrow-in-Furness, and served during the Second World War. In March 1943, she was badly damaged while anchored in Tripoli harbour by aircraft and beached to prevent her from sinking. Temporarily repaired and towed to England, further repair work was halted in January 1945, and she was broken up for scrap in 1947.

The "Hunt" class were named after British fox and stag hunts, in this case, the Derwent hunt Ryedale, North Yorkshire. In February 1942, she was adopted by the civil community of Easthampstead, Berkshire, after a National Savings campaign.

== Construction and design ==
Derwent was one of seven Type III Hunt-class destroyers ordered for the Royal Navy on 4 July 1940, as part of the 1940 War Emergency Programme. The Hunt class was meant to fill the Royal Navy's need for a large number of small destroyer-type vessels capable of both convoy escort and operations with the fleet. The Type III Hunts differed from the previous Type II ships in replacing a twin 4-inch (102 mm) gun mount by two torpedo tubes to improve their ability to operate as destroyers.

The Type III Hunts were 264 ft 3 in (80.54 m) long between perpendiculars and 280 ft (85.34 m) overall, with a beam of 31 ft 6 in (9.60 m) and draught of 7 ft 9 in (2.36 m). Displacement was 1,050 long tons (1,070 t) standard and 1,490 long tons (1,510 t) under full load. Two Admiralty three-drum boilers raising steam at 300 psi (2,100 kPa) and 620 °F (327 °C) fed Parsons single-reduction geared steam turbines that drove two propeller shafts, generating 19,000 shp (14,000 kW) at 380 rpm. This gave a design maximum speed of 27 kn (50 km/h; 31 mph). 345 long tons (351 t) of oil fuel were carried, giving a range of 3,700 nmi (6,900 km; 4,300 mi) at 15 kn (28 km/h; 17 mph).

Main gun armament was four 4-in QF Mk XVI dual purpose guns in two twin mounts, with a quadruple 2-pounder "pom-pom" and three 20 mm (0.79 in) Oerlikon cannons providing close-in anti-aircraft fire. Two 21-inch (533 mm) torpedo tubes were fitted in a single twin mount, while two depth charge chutes, four depth charge throwers and 70 depth charges comprised the ship's anti-submarine armament. Type 291 and Type 285 radars was fitted, as was Type 128 sonar.

Derwent was laid down at Vickers Armstrong's Barrow-in-Furness shipyard on 12 December 1940, was launched on 22 August 1941, and was completed on 24 April 1942.

== Service history ==
Derwent completed acceptance trials, calibrations and worked-up with her crew during May 1942, before joining convoy WS19P in Clyde for Atlantic passage.

In August 1942, Derwent was part of the escort for the Malta relief convoy WS21S during Operation Pedestal, being assigned as part of Force X, which was intended to escort the convoy from Gibraltar, through the Sicilian Narrows to the vicinity of Malta, where escort duties would be taken over by Malta based-ships. (Note: Force X consisted of the cruisers Nigeria, Kenya, Manchester and Cairo, the fleet destroyers Ashanti, Intrepid, Icarus, Foresight, Fury, Pathfinder and Penn and the Hunt-class destroyers Derwent, Bramham, Bicester, Ledbury.) On the evening of 12 August, the cruisers Nigeria and Cairo and the tanker Ohio were torpedoed by the Axum. Derwent, together with the destroyers Bicester and Wilton escorted the damaged Nigeria back to Gibraltar.

On 4 February 1943, Derwent formed part of the escort for the Operation Pamphlet convoy, comprising the liners Aquitania, Île de France, Nieuw Amsterdam, and Queen Mary, which was to carry the 9th Australian Division from Suez to Australia, providing anti-submarine escort through the Red Sea and Gulf of Aden.

=== Loss ===
On 19 March 1943, while anchored in Tripoli harbour, Libya, Derwent was hit by a pattern-running torpedo, claimed to be dropped either by an Italian aircraft, or by a German Ju 88 of KG 30, KG 54 or KG 77. The freighter Ocean Voyager (7,174 grt), and the Greek steamer Vavara (1,654 grt) were also sunk during this attack. Derwent sustained major damage being holed on the port side causing flooding in her Boiler Room and six fatal casualties.

She was beached to stop her from sinking, temporarily repaired and towed to England. More repairs were carried out in HM Dockyard Devonport but the decision was taken to suspend work in January 1945, and she was reduced to the reserve and scrapped in 1947.

== Publications ==
- Barnett, Corelli (2000). Engage The Enemy More Closely. London: Penguin. ISBN 0-141-39008-5.
- Colledge, J. J.; Warlow, Ben (2006) [1969]. Ships of the Royal Navy: The Complete Record of All Fighting Ships of the Royal Navy from the 15th Century to the Present (3rd Rev ed.). London: Chatham Publishing. ISBN 978-1-86176-281-8. OCLC 67375475.
- English, John (1987). The Hunts: A history of the design, development and careers of the 86 destroyers of this class built for the Royal and Allied Navies during World War II. World Ship Society. ISBN 0-905617-44-4.
- Friedman, Norman (2008). British Destroyers and Frigates: The Second World War and After. Barnsley, UK: Seaforth Publishing. ISBN 978-1-84832-015-4.
- Gardiner, Robert; Chesneau, Roger, eds. (1980). Conway's All The World's Fighting Ships 1922–1946. London: Conway Maritime Press. ISBN 0-85177-146-7.
- Lenton, H.T. (1970). Navies of the Second World War: British Fleet & Escort Destroyers Volume Two. London: Macdonald & Co. ISBN 0-356-03122-5.
- Rohwer, Jürgen; Hümmelchen, Gerhard (1992). Chronology of the War at Sea 1939–1945. London: Greenhill Books. ISBN 1-85367-117-7.
- Shores, Christopher; Massimello, Giovanni; Guest, Russell; Olynyk, Frank; Bock, Winfried (2016). A History of the Mediterranean Air War 1940–1945: Volume Three: Tunisia and the End in Africa: November 1942 – May 1943. London: Grub Street. ISBN 978-1-910690-00-0.
- Vego, M. (Winter 2010). "Major Convoy Operation To Malta, 10–15 August 1942 (Operation Pedestal)" (PDF). Naval War College Review. 63 (1). ISSN 0028-1484. Archived (PDF) from the original on 21 September 2021.
- Whitley, M. J. (2000). Destroyers of World War Two: An International Encyclopedia. London: Cassell & Co. ISBN 1-85409-521-8.
