= SS Norlom =

Cargo ship built in 1919

History
- Name: Editor (1919–41); Empire Dunlin (1941–42); Norlom (1942–43)
- Namesake: dunlin; Norway and Lom
- Owner: United States Shipping Board (1919–37); United States Maritime Commission (1937–41); Ministry of War Transport (1941–42); Norwegian Government (1942–43)
- Operator: United States Shipping Board (1919–37); United States Maritime Commission (1937–41); J Billmeir & Co Ltd (1941–42); Nortraship (1942–43)
- Port of registry: Seattle, United States (1919–41); London, United Kingdom (1941–42); Oslo, Norway (1942–43)
- Builder: Skinner & Eddy
- Yard number: 60
- Launched: 16 August 1919
- Completed: September 1919
- Out of service: 2 December 1943
- Identification: United States Official Number 218887 (1919–41); United Kingdom Official Number 168161 (1941–42); Code Letters LSTG (1919–34); Code Letters KOBG (1934–41); Code Letters GNLL (1941-42)
- Fate: Bombed and sunk 1943, scrapped 1946

General characteristics
- Class & type: Design 1105 cargo ship
- Tonnage: 6,326 GRT; 3,972 NRT; 9,698 DWT
- Length: 402 ft 6 in (122.68 m)
- Beam: 54 ft 8 in (16.66 m)
- Depth: 32 ft 1 in (9.78 m)
- Installed power: 359 nhp
- Propulsion: Triple expansion steam engine
- Speed: 10.5 kn (19.4 km/h)
- Crew: 32, plus 6 DEMS gunners (Norlom)
- Armament: One 4-inch or 4.7-inch gun, ten machine guns (Norlom)

Location where Norlom was bombed and sunk in Italy.

Norlom was a 6,326 GRT Design 1105 cargo ship that was built in 1919 as Editor by Skinner & Eddy Corporation, Seattle, Washington, United States for the United States Shipping Board (USSB), which became the United States Maritime Commission (USMC) in 1937. In 1941, she was transferred to the British Ministry of War Transport (MoWT) and renamed Empire Dunlin. She was transferred to Norway in 1942 and renamed Norlom. She served until 2 December 1943 when she was bombed and sunk at Bari, Italy.

== Description ==
The ship was built in 1919 by Skinner & Eddy Corporation, Seattle, Washington. She was yard number 60.

The ship was 402 feet 6 inches (122.68 m) long, with a beam of 54 feet 8 inches (16.66 m). She had a depth of 21 feet 1 inch (6.43 m). She was assessed at 6,326 GRT, 3,972 NRT. Her DWT was 9,698.

The ship was propelled by a 510 nhp triple expansion steam engine, which had cylinders of 24 1/2 inches (62 cm), 41 1/2 inches (105 cm) and 72 inches (180 cm) diameter by 48 inches (120 cm) stroke. The engine was built by Hooven, Owens, Rentschler and Company, Hamilton, Ohio. It drove a single screw propeller and could propel the ship at 10.5 knots (19.4 km/h).

== History ==
=== Pre-war ===
Editor was launched in 1919, and completed in September of that year. She was built for the USSB. The United States Official Number 218887 and Code Letters LSTG were allocated. Her port of registry was Seattle. From 1921 to 1924, she served on the Rotterdam, Netherlands – New York route. With the change of Code Letters in 1934, Editor was allocated KOBG. Editor was transferred to the USMC in 1937.

=== World War II ===
==== SS Editor ====
Editor departed from Houston, Texas on 24 January 1941 for Halifax, Nova Scotia, Canada, arriving on 5 February. She loaded a cargo of scrap iron, "special cargo", steel and vehicles. She was due to sail with Convoy HX 114, which departed on 11 March for the British port of Liverpool, Lancashire but she did not sail. Instead Editor departed on 20 March as a member of Convoy SC 26, which arrived at Liverpool on 8 April. Her destination was Manchester, Lancashire.

==== SS Empire Dunlin ====
Editor was then transferred to the MoWT and renamed Empire Dunlin. She was allocated the United Kingdom Official Number 168161 and the Code Letters GNLL. Her port of registry was changed to London and she was placed under the management of J Billmeir & Co Ltd. She departed from Liverpool on 25 May as a member of Convoy OG 63, which arrived at Gibraltar on 7 June. She detached from the convoy, and sailed to Philadelphia, Pennsylvania, arriving on 13 June. She departed that day and sailed to the Hampton Roads, Virginia, arriving on 14 June and remaining at anchor there until 2 August. Empire Dunlin sailed on that day, but returned to the Hampton Roads on 7 August. She again remained at anchor until 23 September, when she departed for Sydney, Cape Breton, Canada, arriving on 28 September. Laden with a cargo of scrap steel, she departed the next day as a member of Convoy SC 47, which arrived at Liverpool on 20 October. Empire Dunlin left the convoy at Oban, Argyllshire, on the west coast of Scotland on 17 October. She departed two days later with Convoy WN 195, which arrived at Methil, Fife (on the Scottish east coast) on 22 October. She left the convoy at Kirkwall, Orkney Islands on 21 October, departing the next day to join Convoy WN 196, which had left Oban on 20 October and arrived at Methil on 23 October. She then joined Convoy FS 629, which departed the next day and arrived at Southend, Essex on 26 October. She left the convoy at Hull, Yorkshire on 26 October, for repairs to collision and weather damage.

Empire Dunlin joined Convoy FN 556, which had departed from Southend on 18 November and arrived at Methil on 20 November. She then joined Convoy EN 9, which departed that day and arrived at Oban on 23 November. She left the convoy at Loch Ewe on 22 November and then sailed to New York, arriving on 17 December.

Empire Dunlin departed from New York on 4 January 1942 and sailed to Sydney, arriving on 8 January. She then joined Convoy SC 64, which departed the next day and arrived at Liverpool on 23 January. She was carrying general cargo bound for London. She left the convoy at Loch Ewe and sailed to Southend via convoys WN 235, WN 236, FS 712 and FN 631, arriving on 31 January.

Empire Dunlin departed from Southend on 14 February as a member of Convoy FN 631, which arrived at Methil on 16 February. She then joined Convoy EN 49, which departed on 20 February and arrived at Oban on 23 February. She was in ballast, and left the convoy at Loch Ewe on 22 February. Empire Dunlin then sailed to Philadelphia, arriving on 18 March. She departed on 24 April and sailed to New York, arriving the next day. On 26 April 1942, Empire Dunlin was on a voyage from New York to the United Kingdom with a cargo of steel when she ran aground on Valiant Rock, off New London, Connecticut, United States. The ship developed a leak and was abandoned. She was refloated on 11 May and towed to New York for repairs, arriving on 13 May.

Empire Dunlin departed from New York on 25 August, sailing to Cape Cod Bay, Massachusetts, where she joined Convoy BX 35, which departed from Boston on 26 August and arrived at Halifax two days later. Carrying general cargo and steel, she joined Convoy SC 98, which departed from Halifax on 29 August and arrived at Liverpool on 13 September. She left the convoy at Loch Ewe on 12 September and joined Convoy WN 336, which arrived at Methil on 15 September. She then joined Convoy FS 909, which departed the next day and arrived at Southend on 18 September. She left the convoy at Hull on 18 September.

==== SS Norlom ====
On 1 October, Empire Dunlin was transferred to the Norwegian Government and renamed Norlom. She was placed under the management of Nortraship. Her port of registry was changed to Oslo, even though Norway was occupied by the Germans. She departed from Spurn Head on 27 October to join Convoy FN 850, which had departed from Southend the previous day and arrived at Methil on 29 October. She then joined Convoy EN 156, which departed that day and arrived at Loch Ewe on 1 November. She sailed on to Oban, arriving that day and departing eight days later to join Convoy ON 144, which had departed from Liverpool on 7 November and arrived at New York on 27 November. Her destination was Halifax, where she arrived on 25 November. Laden with general cargo, Norlom departed from Halifax on 15 December as a member of Convoy HX 219 destined for Liverpool but left the convoy at Loch Ewe on 28 December and sailed to the Tyne via Methil, arriving on 1 January 1943.

Norlom left the Tyne on 29 January to join Convoy FN 930, which had departed from Southend the previous day and arrived back at Methil on 30 January. joining Convoy EN 191, which departed that day and arrived at Loch Ewe on 1 February. Norlom sailed the next day, bound for Iceland, where on 8 February she joined Convoy ON 165 from Liverpool and arrived at New York on 1 March. On 17 February, a fault developed with her rudder when she was at 51°50′N 40°12′W. Norlom was bound for New York, but put in at St. John's Newfoundland, arriving on 23 February. She departed from St. John's on 25 April as a member of Convoy JH 50, which arrived at Halifax two days later. Norlom then joined convoy XB 49, which departed on 2 May and arrived at Boston two days later. She left the convoy at the Cape Cod Canal and sailed to New York, arriving on 5 May and departing the next day for Baltimore, Maryland, where she arrived on 7 May. She departed from Baltimore on 19 May and sailed to Boston via New York. Norlom was a member of Convoy BX 54, which departed on 26 May and arrived at Halifax on 28 May. Laden with steel and general cargo, she departed from Halifax on 5 June as a member of Convoy SC 133, which arrived at Liverpool on 19 June. She left the convoy at Loch Ewe and joined Convoy WN 433, which sailed that day and arrived at Methil on 21 June. She then joined Convoy FS 1148, which departed that day and arrived at Southend on 23 June. She left the convoy at Middlesbrough, Yorkshire, arriving on 22 June.

Norlom departed from Middlesbrough on 9 July to join Convoy FN 1068, which had departed from Southend the previous day and arrived at Methil on 10 July. She then joined Convoy EN 254, which departed on 11 July and arrived at Loch Ewe two days later. She sailed on to Oban, arriving on 14 July and sailing the next day to join Convoy ONS 13, which had departed from Liverpool on 14 July and arrived at Halifax on 29 July. She then joined Convoy ON 193, which had departed from Liverpool on 16 July and arrived at New York on 31 July. Norlom departed from New York on 5 August as a member of Convoy NG 378, which arrived at Guantanamo Bay, Cuba on 12 August. She departed that day with Convoy GAT 80, which arrived at Trinidad on 18 August. She left the convoy at La Romana, Dominican Republic on 14 August, departing eight days later for San Pedro de Macorís, where she arrived on 23 August.

Laden with a cargo of sugar, Norlom departed from San Pedro de Macorís on 25 August and sailed to Guantanamo Bay. She then joined Convoy GK 754, which sailed on 28 August and arrived at Key West, Florida on 31 August. She departed the next day with Convoy KN 262, which arrived at New York on 7 September, departing two days later for Boston, from where she departed on 11 September as a member of Convoy BX 73, which arrived at Halifax on 13 September. Norlom was a member of Convoy SC 142, which departed from Halifax on 15 September and arrived at Liverpool on 29 September, although Norlom did not arrive until 30 September.

Carrying a cargo of coal and lorries, Norlom departed from Liverpool on 27 October as a member of Convoy OS57 km, which split at sea on 9 November. Convoy OS 57 arrived at Freetown, Sierra Leone on 27 October. She was in the part of the convoy which formed Convoy KMS 31 and arrived at Gibraltar on 10 November. Norlom was armed with a 4-inch or 4.7-inch gun and ten machine guns. Passing Gibraltar, she then joined Convoy KMS 31, which arrived at Port Said, Egypt on 21 November. Her destination was Augusta, Italy, where she arrived on 16 November. Norlom departed the next day with Convoy AH 9, which was bound for Bari. She left the convoy at Taranto on 18 November. She departed on 24 November for Bari, arriving the next day.

=== Loss ===
On 2 December, Norlom was in port at Bari when a large force consisting of 105 Junkers Ju 88 aircraft of the Luftwaffe bombed the port. The Liberty ship John L. Motley, laden with a cargo of ammunition, was hit and exploded. Another Liberty ship, the John Harvey was carrying a cargo of US mustard gas bombs, some of which released their contents. A bulk fuel line was severed, and blazing fuel set fire to a number of ships, including Norlom, which sank. In total, twenty-eight ships were sunk, and six were damaged in the raid. Of Norlom's crew of 32 and six DEMS gunners, three crew and a gunner were killed in the raid. Her first officer died on 14 December from injuries received in the attack. A sixth crewmember died after the war from the effects of the mustard gas. Norlom was assessed as "possibly salvable". Those lost on board Norlom are commemorated at the Minnehallen, Stavern, Norway. The ship was refloated in November 1946 and scrapped at Bari in 1947.
