= Kairo =

Kairo may refer to:

- Kairo (band), Mexican boy band from 1993 to 1999 with Eduardo Verástegui as member until 1996
- Kairo (video game), independently published exploration video game made by Richard Perrin
- Kairo (film), A.K.A. Pulse, a 2001 Japanese film directed by Kiyoshi Kurosawa
- Kairo-kō, a 1905 novel by Japanese author Natsume Sōseki
- Kai-ro, a superhero in episodes of Batman Beyond and Justice League Unlimited cartoons (a future Green Lantern), named after Green Lantern's alien sidekick Kairo.
- Kairō, a cloister-like part of a Japanese Buddhist temple
- Kairo is also a Japanese term for a hand warmer
- Kairo block, a community development block in Jharkhand, India
- Kairo, Lohardaga, a village in Jharkhand, India

== See also ==
- Kairos (disambiguation)
- Cairo (disambiguation)
