= SS John Harvey =

U.S. World War II ammunition ship

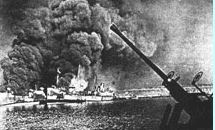
- SS John Harvey on fire on 2 December 1943, at Bari

History

United States
- Name: John Harvey
- Namesake: John Harvey
- Operator: Agwilines Inc
- Builder: North Carolina Shipbuilding Company, Wilmington, North Carolina
- Yard number: 56
- Way number: 2
- Laid down: 6 December 1942
- Launched: 9 January 1943
- Completed: 19 January 1943
- Fate: Bombed in Bari, 1943. Scrapped 1948.

General characteristics
- Class & type: Type EC2-S-C1 Liberty ship
- Displacement: 14,245 long tons (14,474 t)
- Length: 441 ft 6 in (134.57 m) o/a; 417 ft 9 in (127.33 m) p/p; 427 ft (130 m) w/l
- Beam: 57 ft (17 m)
- Draft: 27 ft 9 in (8.46 m)
- Propulsion: Two oil-fired boilers; Triple-expansion steam engine; 2,500 hp (1,900 kW); Single screw
- Speed: 11 knots (20 km/h; 13 mph)
- Range: 20,000 nmi (37,000 km; 23,000 mi)
- Capacity: 10,856 t (10,685 long tons) deadweight (DWT)
- Crew: 81
- Armament: Stern-mounted 4 in (100 mm) deck gun for use against surfaced submarines, variety of anti-aircraft guns

SS John Harvey was a U.S. World War II Liberty ship. This ship is known for carrying a secret cargo of mustard gas and whose sinking by German aircraft in December 1943 at the port of Bari in southeastern Italy caused an unintentional release of chemical weapons.

The John Harvey was built by the North Carolina Shipbuilding Company in Wilmington, North Carolina, and launched on 9 January 1943. Her Maritime Commission Hull Number was 878, and she was rated as capable of carrying 504 soldiers. She was operated by Agwilines Inc.

== Bari incident ==
In August 1943, Roosevelt approved the shipment of chemical munitions containing mustard agent to the Mediterranean theater. On 18 November 1943 the John Harvey, commanded by Captain Elwin F. Knowles, sailed from Oran (French Algeria) to Italy, carrying 2,000 M47A1 mustard gas bombs, each of which held 60–70 lb of sulfur mustard. After stopping for an inspection by an officer of the 7th Chemical Ordnance Company at Augusta, Sicily on 26 November, the John Harvey sailed through the Strait of Otranto to arrive at Bari.

Bari was packed with ships waiting to be unloaded, and the John Harvey had to wait for several days. Captain Knowles wanted to tell the British port commander about his deadly cargo and request it be unloaded as soon as possible, but secrecy prevented his doing so.

On 2 December 1943 German aircraft attacked Bari, killing over 1,000 people, and sinking 28 ships, including the John Harvey, which was destroyed in a huge explosion, causing liquid sulfur mustard to spill into the water, mixing with oil from the sunken ships, and a cloud of sulfur mustard vapor to blow over the city. Nearly all crewmen of John Harvey perished in the sinking; this prevented the rescuers from knowing the real nature of the danger until an M47A1 bomb fragment was retrieved from the wreckage.

A total of 628 military victims were hospitalized with mustard gas symptoms, and by the end of the month, 83 of them had died. The number of civilian casualties, thought to have been even greater, could not be accurately gauged since most had left the city to seek shelter with relatives.

Chemical warfare expert Dr. Stewart Francis Alexander found out about the mustard gas and gave the medics a correct treatment. While examining tissues collected on autopsied victims, he found out that mustard gas destroys white blood cells and other kinds of rapid dividing cells. This discovery was further investigated by pharmacologists, Louis S. Goodman and Alfred Gilman who had started in August 1942 a research on a mustard gas related agent, mustine, as the first chemotherapy treatment.

In order to try to cover-up the in-theater possession of chemical weapons by the Allies, the deaths were attributed to "burns due to enemy action". Reports were purged or classified but, since there were too many witnesses to keep the secret, in February 1944, the U.S. Chiefs of Staff issued a statement admitting to the accident and emphasizing that the U.S. had no intention of using chemical weapons except in the case of retaliation. U.S. records of the attack were declassified in 1959 and the British government admitted the poison gas release and harm caused to the surviving victims.

Details of the attack were given in a 1967 article in the US Navy journal Proceedings, and in a 1976 book by Glenn B. Infield, Disaster at Bari.

== See also ==
- Geneva Protocol
- Chemical warfare
