= HMS Bicester (L34) =

Destroyer of the Royal Navy

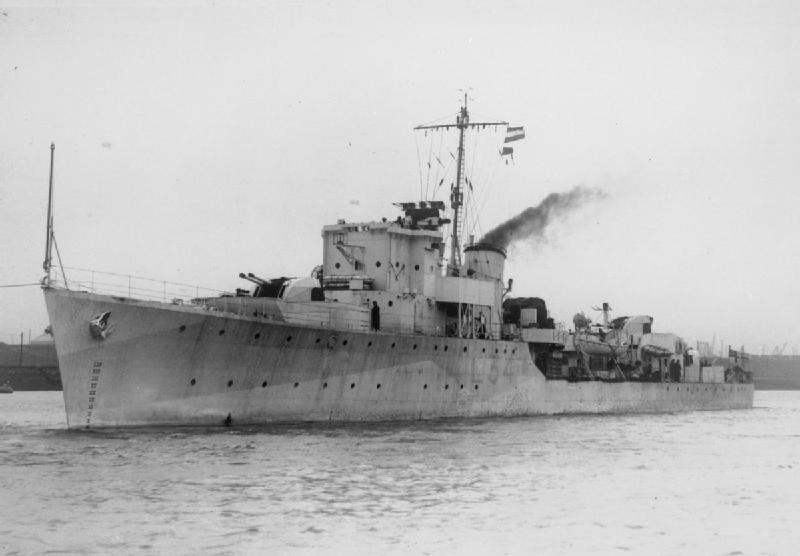
- HMS Bicester, underway on tow.

History

United Kingdom
- Name: HMS Bicester
- Namesake: Bicester
- Ordered: 12 December 1939
- Builder: Hawthorn Leslie & Co., Hebburn-on-Tyne
- Laid down: 29 May 1940
- Launched: 5 September 1941
- Commissioned: 9 May 1942
- Identification: Pennant number: L34
- Honours and awards: North Africa 1942–43; Malta Convoys 1941–42; Mediterranean 1942-43; South France 1944; Adriatic 1944; Aegean 1944
- Fate: Scrapped at Thos. W. Ward Grays, 22 August 1956

General characteristics
- Class & type: Type II Hunt-class destroyer
- Displacement: 1,050 tons standard; 1,490 tons full load
- Length: 85.34 m (280.0 ft)
- Beam: 9.62 m (31.6 ft)
- Draught: 2.51 m (8 ft 3 in)
- Propulsion: 2 shaft Parsons geared turbines; 19,000 shp
- Speed: 25.5 kn (47.2 km/h; 29.3 mph)
- Range: 3,600 nmi (6,670 km) at 14 knots (26 km/h)
- Complement: 164
- Armament: 6 × QF 4 in Mark XVI on twin mounts Mk. XIX; AAA - 2 × 4 12.7mm Vickers, 2 × 20 mm; 6 Thornycroft depth charge throwers

HMS Bicester (pennant number L34) was an escort destroyer of the Type II Hunt class. The Royal Navy ordered Bicester's construction three months after the outbreak of the Second World War. Hawthorn Leslie & Co. laid down her keel at their Tyne yard on 29 May 1940, as Admiralty Job Number J4210. The ship was named after a fox hunt in Oxfordshire.

== Career ==
=== Early operations ===
Bicester began her contractor trials and commissioning in June, passing her acceptance trials on 16 June and beginning work-up procedures. On 26 June Bicester escorted King George VI and Queen Elizabeth back to England after their visit to a naval base at Larne, Northern Ireland. In July, the destroyer completed her work-up, and joined the Londonderry Special Escort Force. On 29 July Bicester joined military convoy WS21 in the Clyde with the destroyers Bramham, Wilton, Keppel and Salisbury as the local escort for the convoy during its passage in the Northwestern Approaches.

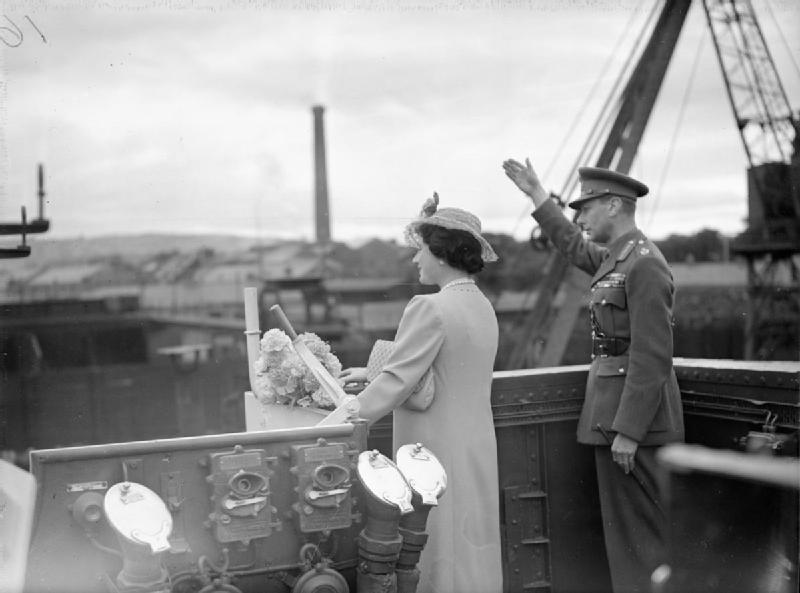
King George VI waves from the bridge of Bicester, after a royal visit at Larne, Northern Ireland.

In August, Bicester was nominated for detached escort service for a convoy aimed to relieve Malta. On 4 August Bicester detached from WS21, and joined the Malta relief convoy WS21S, which had set off from the Clyde to Gibraltar on 2 August as part of Operation Pedestal. The destroyer passed through the Strait of Gibraltar, and joined the escort for ships on 11 August while on passage through the Sicilian Narrows to Malta.

On 12 August the convoy came under heavy submarine and air attack, during which the aircraft carrier Eagle was sunk. Further attacks by submarines sank and severely damaged both escorts and ships, with the result that Bicester had to be detached from the convoy along with Derwent and Wilton to escort the damaged Nigeria back to Gibraltar. On 18 August Bicester was released from Operation Pedestal, and the destroyer took passage back to Derry to resume her escort duties, joining as local escort of military convoy WS22 on 28 August.

=== Back to Gibraltar ===
Bicester detached from WS22 on 1 September, returning to Derry for further convoy escort duties, which included joining military convoy WS23 in the Clyde on 4 October. After detaching from WS23, Bicester returned for escort duties in Derry, and was nominated for the escort of military convoys to North Africa for allied landings on 8 October. Bicester was deployed escorting the convoys to Gibraltar throughout November and December.

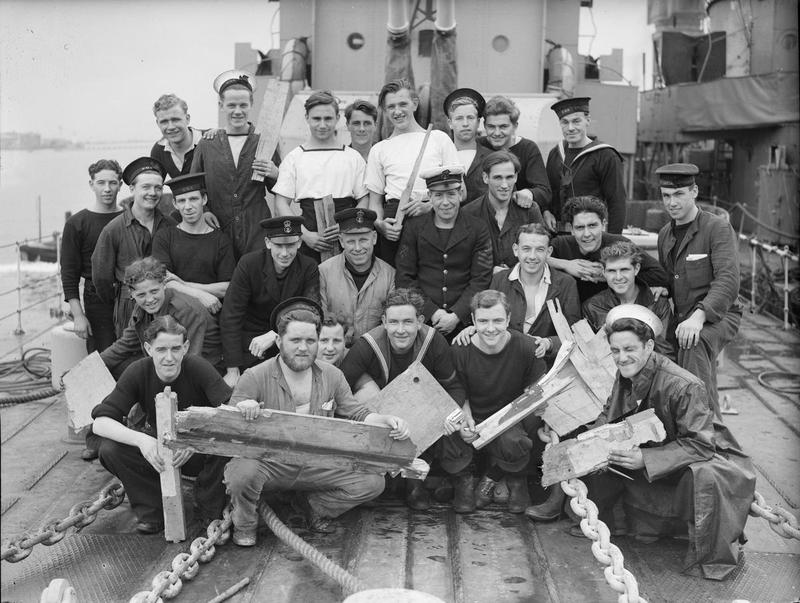
Crew of the Bicester at Algiers, following the sinking of a U-boat Off North African Coast, 24 February 1943 (IWM A14948)

In January 1943, Bicester was based at Algiers in continuation of her duties. In February, the destroyer was deployed with other Hunt-class destroyers for patrol and convoy escorting duties. On 17 February she took part in the search for the Italian submarine Asteria whilst defending a convoy. On 20 February Bicester was deployed with the destroyers Lamerton and Wheatland on their search for the German submarine, U-443. Bicester took part in attacks on the German submarine, along with the other two destroyers and on 23 February, after a three-day search and destroy operation, the submarine was sunk by sustained depth charge attacks, with no survivors.

Between March and April, Bicester continued her convoy defence and patrol duties at Algiers. In May the destroyer took part in the blockade of the Cape Bon area in order to prevent the escape of Axis craft. On 9 May, during deployment with Oakley, the destroyers found themselves under air attack by Spitfire aircraft; Bicester sustained major damage from a near miss, with the bomb exploding alongside causing major flooding and extensive damage. Bicester was taken in tow to Malta for temporary repairs, which were carried out in June. In July, the destroyer made a passage through to the United Kingdom for permanent repairs, which were carried out between August and September.

=== Malta, Adriatic and Indian Ocean ===
In October, Bicester was nominated for service in the 59th Destroyer Division, which was based in Malta, with the destroyer continuing her post repair trials. The destroyer made a passage to Malta in November, where she was deployed in the Adriatic and the central Mediterranean. On 2 December Bicester was damaged during an air raid on Bari when an ammunition ship was hit and exploded, spreading her cargo of mustard gas over the harbour and town. The destroyer Zetland was also damaged, but less seriously. Zetland towed Bicester to Taranto for repairs. There were so many mustard gas casualties that, on arrival in Taranto, the ships had to ask for assistance to enter the harbour as all navigating officers had their vision impaired by this chemical weapon.

In January 1944, the destroyer was under repair. These were completed on 15 January with a post repair trial and the resumption of convoy defence duty. Bicester was deployed for convoy escort duties in the central Mediterranean, and for support of military operations in the Adriatic between February and April. On 5 May Bicester bombarded the town of Ardea in support of shore operations. Between June and July, the destroyer was back in the Adriatic in the support and defence of convoys.

Bicester joined US Navy ships on their passage to Naples in August 1944, forming part of the escort for Assault Convoy SM1 which was made up of three Royal Navy trawlers, and six US Navy minor warships. The destroyer detached from SM1 on 15 August upon arriving off the landing beachhead. After being released from Operation Dragoon, Bicester returned to Royal Navy control in September, and was deployed in the Adriatic in the support of convoys, guerrilla attacks and other shore operations. Between October and November, Bicester formed close support of the reoccupation of a number of Aegean islands, as well as convoy defence duties. During December and January, the destroyer was a Piraeus guardship, supporting and defending convoys, until she was rebased at Malta from where she was nominated for refit in Alexandria.

The refit of Bicester began in March, and the destroyer was nominated for service in the Eighteenth Destroyer Flotilla of the Eastern Fleet. The destroyer made a passage to the United Kingdom, where she was taken-in-hand for refit in order to improve habitability in June, 1945. Upon completion of these works in July, the ship was recommissioned and the destroyer was ordered into the Indian Ocean to join the flotilla of the Eastern Fleet. In August Bicester arrived at Trincomalee before VJ Day, and joined the flotilla. On 28 August the destroyer sailed from Trincomalee as part of escort for Convoy JMA2BS during her passage to assault a beachhead near Port Dickson.

=== Post War Service ===
Bicester remained in the Eastern Fleet and became the Leader of 29th Destroyer Flotilla, based at Bombay. She was deployed for fleet duties until her return to the United Kingdom in November.

After her arrival at Sheerness on 12 December 1945 Bicester was deployed in the Nore Local Flotilla. In 1947, the destroyer became the Leader of Flotilla, and was deployed for training and local duties (including her carrying the Olympic Flame across the English Channel in July 1948 for the 1948 Summer Olympics in London) until January 1950 when she paid-off and was put in Reserve at Chatham.

Although brought forward to attend the Coronation Review in 1953, in which she took part she was not recommissioned for operational service and was placed on the Disposal List in 1955. She was sold to Thos. W. Ward in 1956, and arrived in tow at the breakers yard in Grays, Essex, on 23 August 1956 for demolition.

== Publications ==
- Colledge, J. J.; Warlow, Ben (2006) [1969]. Ships of the Royal Navy: The Complete Record of All Fighting Ships of the Royal Navy from the 15th Century to the Present (3rd Rev ed.). London: Chatham Publishing. ISBN 978-1-86176-281-8. OCLC 67375475.
