= SS Fort Athabaska =

History

United Kingdom
- Name: SS Fort Athabaska
- Owner: Ministry of War Transport
- Operator: J. & C. Harrison, London
- Builder: Burrard Dry Dock Co. Ltd., North Vancouver
- Completed: 15 May 1943
- Fate: Sunk, 2 December 1943

General characteristics
- Class & type: North Sands-type Fort ship
- Tonnage: 7,130 GRT
- Length: 441 ft 6 in (134.57 m)
- Beam: 57 ft 2 in (17.42 m)
- Draught: 26 ft 11.5 in (8.217 m)
- Propulsion: 3 cyl triple expansion steam; 2500 ihp; One shaft.
- Speed: 11 knots (13 mph; 20 km/h)
- Range: 11,400 nmi (21,100 km) at 10 kn (12 mph; 19 km/h)
- Complement: 115
- Armament: During the Second World War: 1 × 4-inch (100 mm) gun; 8 × 20mm AA guns

SS Fort Athabaska was a Canadian-owned Fort ship, sunk while under British naval use in 1943. With the heavy demand for British cargo ships it was given to British naval forces. She was a North Sands type Fort ship built by Burrard Dry Dock of North Vancouver, and completed 15 May 1943.

== History ==
On 2 December 1943 multiple squadrons of German bombers conducted a destructive air assault on Bari Harbour in Italy. Twenty-eight Allied ships were sunk in the raid with contents of mustard gas in one of their hulls. The moment the gas spread, the harbour became a poisonous inferno. One of the ships sunk in the raid was Fort Athabaska. The contents of the ship whilst it was stationed at Bari is unknown, but some records suggest medical/oil/ammunition supplies. The fate of the ship was sealed when multiple bombs penetrated the decks of the ship, leaving holes in the hull that could not be repaired. The order to abandon ship was given and the ship quickly submerged. Fort and Park ship were the Canadian equivalent of the American Liberty ships. All three shared a similar design by J.L. Thompson and Sons of Sunderland, England. Fort ships had a triple expansion steam engine and a single screw propeller.
