= HMS Zetland (L59) =

Destroyer of the Royal Navy

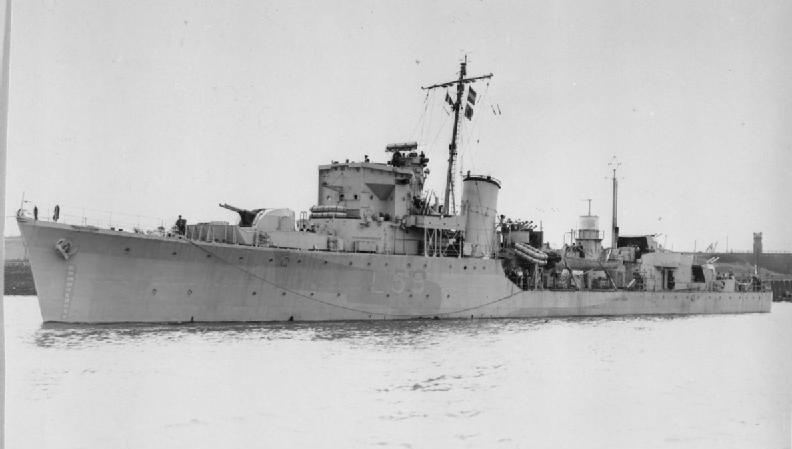
- Zetland in August 1943

History

United Kingdom
- Name: HMS Zetland
- Namesake: Zetland Hunt
- Ordered: 20 December 1939
- Builder: Yarrow Shipbuilders, Glasgow
- Laid down: 2 October 1940
- Launched: 7 March 1942
- Commissioned: 27 June 1942
- Honours and awards: Atlantic 1942-43; Malta Convoys 1942; North Africa 1942-4; Mediterranean 1943-44; Aegean 1944; Adriatic 1944; South France 1944
- Fate: Loaned to the Royal Norwegian Navy in 1952; Sold to them in July 1956
- Badge: On a Field Black. within a horseshoe inverted White, a lion's face Gold.

Norway
- Name: HNoMS Tromsø
- Acquired: Loaned 1952; Purchased July 1956
- Identification: Pennant number: D311 changed to F311 after 1956
- Fate: Sold for breaking up in 1965
- Notes: Transferred to the Royal Norwegian Navy 31 October 1954 at South Shields Co Durham.

General characteristics
- Class & type: Type II Hunt-class destroyer
- Displacement: 1,050 tons standard; 1,490 tons full load
- Length: 85.34 m (280.0 ft)
- Beam: 9.62 m (31.6 ft)
- Draught: 2.51 m (8 ft 3 in)
- Propulsion: 2 shaft Parsons geared turbines; 19,000 shp
- Speed: 25.5 kn (47.2 km/h; 29.3 mph)
- Range: 3,600 nmi (6,670 km) at 14 knots (26 km/h)
- Complement: 164
- Armament: 6 × QF 4 in Mark XVI on twin mounts Mk. XIX; AAA - 2 x 4 12.7mm Vickers, 2 x 20 mm; 6 Thornycroft depth charge throwers,

HMS Zetland was a Royal Navy Type II Hunt-class destroyer, named after the Zetland Hunt.

Built by Yarrow Shipbuilders, Glasgow and launched on 7 March 1942. She was commissioned on 27 June 1942 with the pennant number L59. Zetland was given to the Royal Norwegian Navy and commissioned as HNoMS Tromsø. She was sold for breaking up in 1965.

== Construction ==
HMS Zetland was ordered from Yarrows on 20 December 1939, one of 16 Type II Hunt-class destroyers ordered from various shipbuilders on that date, (including two from Yarrows). The Hunts were meant to fill the Royal Navy's need for a large number of small destroyer-type vessels capable of both convoy escort and operations with the fleet. The Type II Hunts differed from the earlier ships in having increased beam in order to improve stability (Note: A design error caused the first Hunt, Atherstone to be dangerously unstable when built. The first 23 Hunts had a twin 4-inch mount removed, the ships' superstructure cut down and ballast fitted in order to restore adequate stability.) and carry the ships' originally intended armament.

Zetland was laid down at Yarrow's Scotstoun, Glasgow shipyard on 2 October 1940, was launched on 15 January 1942 and completed on 7 May 1942. (Note: Although not explicitly mentioned in English or Mason, it is possible that construction was delayed by the same German air raid that delayed completion of Oakley at Yarrow.)

Zetland was 264 feet 3 inches (80.54 m) long between perpendiculars and 280 feet (85.34 m) overall. The ship's beam was 31 feet 6 inches (9.60 m) and draught 7 feet 9 inches (2.36 m). Displacement was 1,050 long tons (1,070 t) standard and 1,490 long tons (1,510 t) under full load. Two Admiralty boilers raising steam at 300 pounds per square inch (2,100 kPa) and 620 °F (327 °C) fed Parsons single-reduction geared steam turbines that drove two propeller shafts, generating 19,000 shaft horsepower (14,000 kW) at 380 rpm. This gave a speed of 27 knots (50 km/h; 31 mph). 277 long tons (281 t) of oil were carried, giving a design range of 2,560 nautical miles (4,740 km; 2,950 mi) (although in service use, this dropped to 1,550 nautical miles (2,870 km; 1,780 mi)).

The ship's main gun armament was six 4 inch (102 mm) QF Mk XVI dual purpose (anti-ship and anti-aircraft) guns in three twin mounts, with one mount forward and two aft. Additional close-in anti-aircraft armament was provided by a quadruple 2-pounder "pom-pom" mount and two single Oerlikon 20 mm cannon mounted in the bridge wings. Power-operated twin Oerlikon mounts replaced the single Oerlikons during the war. Up to 110 depth charges could be carried. (Note: While Lenton and Friedman both state a capacity of 110 depth charges, Gardiner and Chesneau give a capacity of 30 or 60 charges.) The ship had a complement of 168 officers and men.

== Second World War service ==
During the Second World War, Zetland saw service in the Atlantic (1942–43), Malta Convoys (1942), north Africa (1942–43), Mediterranean (1943–44), Aegean (1944), Adriatic (1944) and Operation Dragoon, the landings in southern France in 1944.

=== Air Raid on Bari ===
Zetland was one of two Hunt-class destroyers that were damaged in the air raid on Bari on 2 December 1943. An ammunition ship was hit and exploded, spreading her cargo of mustard gas over the harbour and town. Zetland was near-missed by a German bomb, and subject to blast and fragment damage from the explosion of two nearby merchant ships. Zetland's sister ship, Bicester was damaged more seriously. Zetland towed Bicester to Taranto for repairs. There were so many mustard gas casualties that, on arrival in Taranto, the ships had to ask for assistance to enter the harbour as all navigating officers had their vision impaired by this chemical weapon.

== Postwar service ==
Between June and October 1945 Zetland was in refit in Alexandria, before returning to the UK. On 20 April 1946 she paid off into reserve and was assigned to the Solent Division Royal Naval Volunteer Reserve (RNVR) as a drill ship. On 2 September 1954 she was lent to Norway. She was broken up in 1965 at Sarpsborg shipbreakers.

== Publications ==
- Colledge, J. J.; Warlow, Ben (2006) [1969]. Ships of the Royal Navy: The Complete Record of All Fighting Ships of the Royal Navy from the 15th Century to the Present (3rd Rev ed.). London: Chatham Publishing. ISBN 978-1-86176-281-8. OCLC 67375475.
- Critchley, Mike (1982). British Warships Since 1945: Part 3: Destroyers. Liskeard, UK: Maritime Books. ISBN 0-9506323-9-2.
- English, John (1987). The Hunts: a history of the design, development and careers of the 86 destroyers of this class built for the Royal and Allied Navies during World War II. Kendal, UK: World Ship Society. ISBN 0-905617-44-4.
- Friedman, Norman (2008). British Destroyers and Frigates: The Second World War and After. Barnsley, UK: Seaforth Publishing. ISBN 978-1-84832-015-4.
- Gardiner, Robert; Chesneau, Roger, eds. (1980). Conway's All The World's Fighting Ships 1922–1946. London: Conway Maritime Press. ISBN 0-85177-146-7.
- Gardiner, Robert; Chumbley, Stephen, eds. (1995). Conway's All The World's Fighting Ships 1947–1995. Annapolis, Maryland, USA: Naval Institute Press. ISBN 1-55750-132-7.
- H.M. Ships Damaged or Sunk by Enemy Action: 3rd. SEPT. 1939 to 2nd. SEPT. 1945 (PDF). Admiralty. 1952. Archived from the original (PDF) on 10 June 2016.
- Lenton, H.T. (1970). Navies of the Second World War: British Fleet & Escort Destroyers Volume Two. London: Macdonald & Co. ISBN 0-356-03122-5.
- Rohwer, Jürgen; Hümmelchen, Gerhard (1992). Chronology of the War at Sea 1939–1945. London: Greenhill Books. ISBN 1-85367-117-7.
- Southern, George (2002). Poisonous Inferno: WWII Tragedy at Bari Harbour. Airlife Publishing Ltd. ISBN 184037389X.
- Whitley, M.J. (2000). Destroyers of World War Two: An International Encyclopedia. London: Cassell & Co. ISBN 1-85409-521-8.
