= Cape Cairo =

Peninsula in Nunavut, Canada

Coordinates: 78.835°N 100.354°W

Cape Cairo is a peninsula in Qikiqtaaluk Region, Nunavut, Canada. It is located on eastern Ellef Ringnes Island.
