= Cairo (surname) =

Cairo is a surname. Notable people with the surname include:

- Ellery Cairo (born 1978), Dutch soccer player
- Ferdinando del Cairo (1666–1748), Italian Baroque painter
- Francesco Cairo (1607–1665), Italian painter
- Hannah Cairo (born 2008), American mathematician
- Miguel Cairo (born 1974), Major League Baseball player
- Sofía Cairo (born 2002), Argentine field hockey player
- Tommy Cairo (born 1958), American professional wrestler
- Urbano Cairo (born 1957), Italian businessman and chairman of the Torino football club
