= Stewart Francis Alexander =

American doctor

- Born: August 30, 1914; Park Ridge, New Jersey
- Died: December 6, 1991 (aged 77); Mustique, Saint Vincent and the Grenadines
- Education: Dartmouth College (BS); Columbia University Medical School (MD)
- Occupation: Doctor
- Years active: 1937-1975
- Medical career
- Sub-specialties: chemical warfare cancer treatment
- Military career
- Allegiance: United States
- Branch: United States Army
- Service years: 1941–1945
- Rank: Lieutenant Colonel
- Conflict: World War II; Mediterranean theater; North African campaign; Italian campaign; Air raid on Bari

Lieutenant-Colonel Stewart Francis Alexander (August 30, 1914 – December 6, 1991) was an American medical doctor from New Jersey and an expert on chemical warfare who was dispatched to aid patients following the air raid on Bari during World War II.

Born and raised in Park Ridge, New Jersey, where his father was a family physician, Alexander attended Staunton Military Academy before enrolling at Dartmouth College and earning his medical degree from the Columbia University Medical School.

Trained in the diagnosis of chemical warfare, Alexander was dispatched to attend to victims of the Air raid on Bari in December 1943, in which a total of 27 Allied ships were hit and destroyed in a surprise Nazi air raid. He detected symptoms among the victims that indicated that they had been affected by mustard gas, though the symptoms he spotted were different from the inhalation injuries typically suffered during World War I from the chemical agent. Despite repeated denials that mustard gas had been present on any Allied ships in the harbor, Alexander was able to determine that a ship loaded with mustard gas shells had blown up and that the mustard gas had mixed with the oil floating in the harbor, which acted as a solvent and allowed the chemical warfare agent to be absorbed into the skin of military personnel who had been floating in the water. Though Alexander's detailed report documenting the presence of mustard gas was censored and suppressed for fears that the Nazis would be emboldened to use the chemical warfare agent, his medical reporting showed that the mustard gas had severely impacted the formation of white blood cells in his patients, a finding that led to the development of chemotherapeutic treatments for leukemia that were based on the chemistry of mustard gas.

Alexander had been medical director of Bergen Pines County Hospital (since renamed as New Bridge Medical Center) until 1975 and had served as president of the Bergen County Medical Society and of the New Jersey Academy of Medicine. After a career as an internist and cardiologist, Alexander died of skin cancer while visiting the vacation home of his daughter, Diane Alexander Sugden, in Mustique.
