= Kairo (video game) =

2013 video game

- Developer: Locked Door Puzzle
- Publisher: Lupus Studios Limited
- Designer: Richard Perrin
- Composer: Bartosz Szturgiewicz
- Platforms: Windows, Mac OS X, Linux, iOS, Android
- Release: 24 Apr, 2013
- Genre: Adventure
- Mode: Single-player

Kairo is a first-person exploration/puzzle game developed and published by British studio Locked Door Puzzle, Richard Perrin's independent studio. Kairo is set in a world of brutalist architecture which the player must explore to solve the puzzles contained within.

== Gameplay ==
Kairo is played from a first-person perspective and has no additional controls beyond the ability to look around, move through the environment and jump. Interaction comes in the form of pushing objects, standing on switches or the environment reacting to player movement.

== Story ==
There is no dialogue and very little text in the game. The narrative comes entirely through environmental story-telling as the world is filled with clues and hints towards the player's purpose.

== Reception ==
Reception

Review scores
Publication	Score
Eurogamer	8/10
GamesTM	8/10
TouchArcade	4.5/5

Kairo has received a positive reaction from critics. Eurogamer described the game as "mysterious and elegant and powerfully distinct" and TouchArcade said "The world of Kairo is like a playable, explorable tone poem."

Kairo has been selected for exhibition at events including Develop Conference, Notgames Festival, Eurogamer Expo and Penny Arcade Expo.
