= HMS Cairo =

Royal Navy C-class light cruiser

Coordinates: 37°26′0″N 10°22′0″E

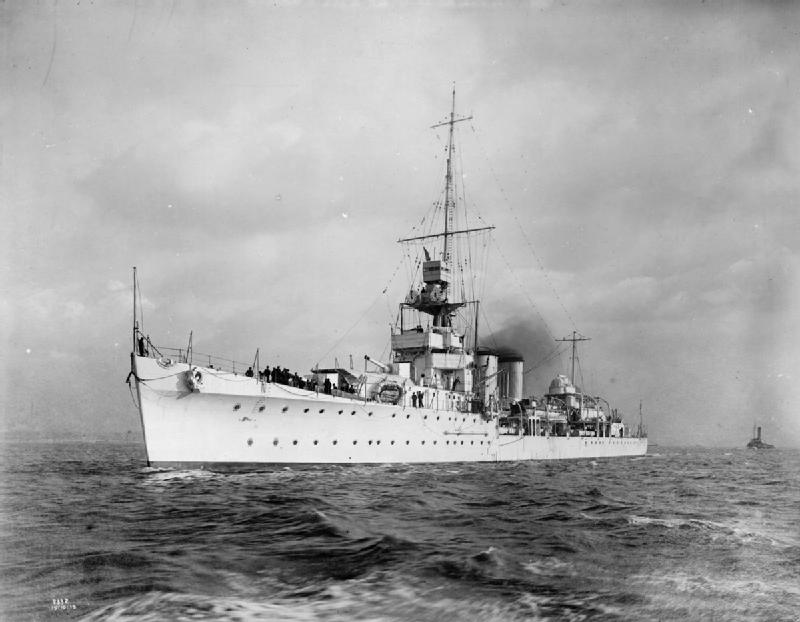

History

United Kingdom
- Name: HMS Cairo
- Builder: Cammell Laird
- Laid down: 17 November 1917
- Launched: 19 November 1918
- Commissioned: 23 September 1919
- Reclassified: Converted to anti-aircraft cruiser in 1939
- Identification: Pennant number: 97 (Sep 19); 87 (Nov 19); I.87 (1936); D.87 (1940)
- Motto: Kaihara ('Victory')
- Honours and awards: Norway 1940; Atlantic 1940-41; Malta Convoys 1942
- Fate: Sunk 12 August 1942 by the Italian submarine Axum off Bizerta
- Badge: "On a Field Blue, a female Egyptian head proper, habited Black and Silver, upon three wavelets Silver"

General characteristics
- Class & type: C-class light cruiser
- Displacement: 4,190 tons
- Length: 451.4 ft (137.6 m)
- Beam: 43.9 ft (13.4 m)
- Draught: 14 ft (4.3 m)
- Installed power: Yarrow boilers; 40,000 shp
- Propulsion: Parsons geared turbines; Two propellers
- Speed: 29 knots
- Range: carried 300 tons (950 tons maximum) of fuel oil
- Complement: 330–350
- Armament: 5 × 6-inch (152 mm) guns; 2 × 3-inch (76 mm) anti-aircraft guns; 4 × 3-pounder guns; 2 × 2-pounder pom-poms; 1 × machine gun; 8 × 21 inch (533 mm) torpedo tubes
- Armour: 3in side (amidships); 2 1/4–1 1/2in side (bows); 2in side (stern); 1in upper decks (amidships); 1in deck over rudder

HMS Cairo (D87) was a C-class light cruiser of the Royal Navy, named after the Egyptian capital, Cairo. So far she has been the only ship of the Royal Navy to bear the name. She was part of the Carlisle group of the C-class of cruisers.

== History ==
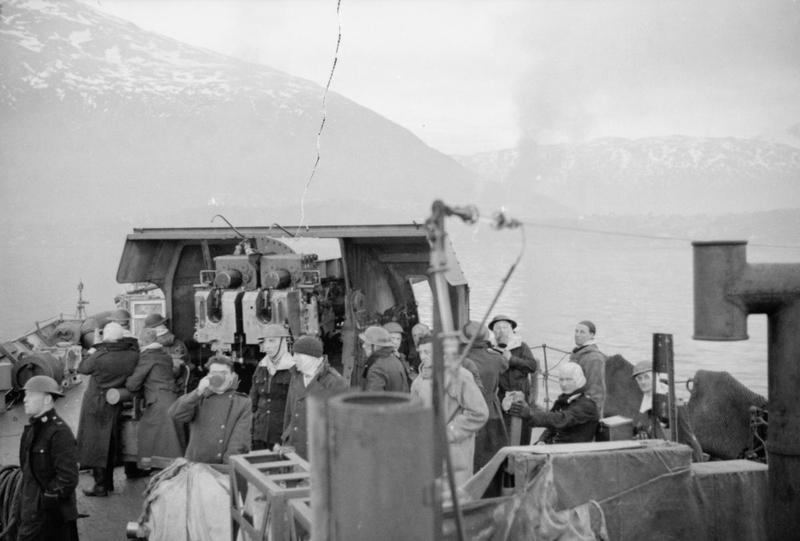
Gun position on HMS Cairo, smoke above Narvik in the back on 8 June 1940.

She was laid down by Cammell Laird at Birkenhead on 28 November 1917, launched on 19 November 1918 and commissioned on 24 September 1919. Cairo was not ready for service in World War I and her first posting was to the China Station in 1920, followed by the East Indies Station from 1921 to 1925. On 23 April 1926 Cairo visited Kismayu, Italian Somaliland, during the Jubaland Boundary Commission. After a further temporary attachment to the China Station until 1927, she joined the 8th Cruiser Squadron on the North America and West Indies Station, based at the Royal Naval Dockyard on Ireland Island, Bermuda. From 1928 to 1930, Cairo was in the Mediterranean as flagship for the Rear-Admiral (D). After a refit from 1931–1932, she was with the Home Fleet as Commodore (D). She was converted to an anti-aircraft cruiser in 1939.

In World War II she took part in the Norwegian Campaign, where she was damaged by German aircraft off Narvik on 28 May 1940. 10 sailors were killed and the ship was out of action for two months. In the Mediterranean she led the escort of a six cargo-ship convoy from Gibraltar to Malta, code named Operation Harpoon, which endured intense air strikes. The British squadron also faced the attack of an Italian light cruiser division in the Sicilia channel. Four merchantmen and two destroyers were sunk, while Cairo was hit by two 6-inch rounds from the Italian cruiser Eugenio di Savoia, killing two members of her crew.

In August 1942, Cairo took part in Operation Pedestal, the escort of a convoy to Malta. During the operation she was torpedoed and sunk by the Italian submarine Axum north of Bizerta, Tunisia, on 12 August 1942. One torpedo blew off part of the stern, the port propeller was gone, the engine room flooded and gun mount Y fell off in the sea. As during the battle it was impossible to tow her to safety, it was decided to scuttle her. The destroyer HMS Pathfinder fired four torpedoes but only one hit. A series of depth charges did not finish her off, so finally the escort destroyer HMS Derwent received orders to sink her with gunfire. Twenty-four seamen went down with the ship.
