= HMS Wilton (L128) =

Destroyer of the Royal Navy

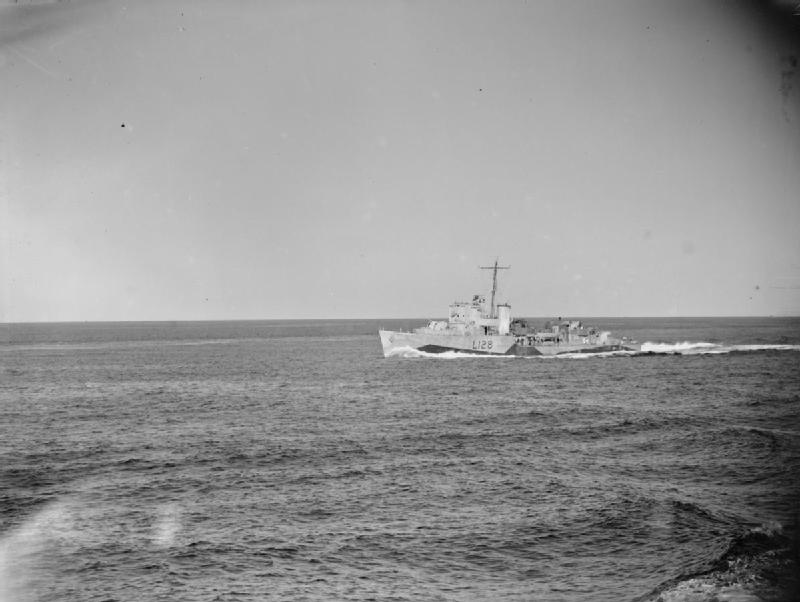
- Wilton at sea off Bizerte (IWM)

History

United Kingdom
- Name: HMS Wilton
- Ordered: 4 September 1939
- Builder: Yarrow Shipbuilders
- Laid down: 7 June 1940
- Launched: 17 October 1941
- Completed: 18 February 1942
- Decommissioned: 19 June 1945
- Identification: Pennant number: L128
- Honours and awards: Arctic 1942; Malta Convoys 1942; North Africa 1942–43; Sicily 1943; Aegean 1943; Mediterranean 1944; Adriatic 1944; North Sea 1945
- Fate: Scrapped at Faslane 1959
- Badge: On a Field White, an eagle's head erased Green gorged with a chain pendant therefrom a bugle horn Gold.

General characteristics Type II
- Class & type: Hunt-class destroyer
- Displacement: 1,050 long tons (1,070 t) standard; 1,430 long tons (1,450 t) full load
- Length: 85.3 m (279 ft 10 in) o/a
- Beam: 9.6 m (31 ft 6 in)
- Draught: 2.51 m (8 ft 3 in)
- Propulsion: 2 Admiralty 3-drum boilers; 2 shaft Parsons geared turbines, 19,000 shp (14,000 kW)
- Speed: 27 knots (31 mph; 50 km/h); 25.5 kn (29.3 mph; 47.2 km/h) full
- Range: 3,600 nmi (6,700 km) at 14 kn (26 km/h)
- Complement: 164
- Armament: 6 × QF 4 in Mark XVI on twin mounts Mk. XIX; 4 × QF 2 pdr Mk. VIII on quad mount MK.VII; 2 × 20 mm Oerlikons on single mounts P Mk. III; 110 depth charges, 2 throwers, 3 racks

HMS Wilton was a Type 2 Hunt-class destroyer of the Royal Navy that served in the Second World War.

== Construction ==
Wilton was ordered from Yarrow Shipbuilders, Scotstoun on 4 September 1939, one of 17 Hunt-class destroyers ordered on that day as part of the 1939 Emergency War Programme. The ship was laid down on 7 June 1940 and was launched on 17 October 1941, commissioning (with the pennant number L128 on 18 February 1942. She was named after "The Wilton Hunt", an annual fox hunt held in Wiltshire. During Warship Week in 1942 she was adopted by the civil community of East Retford in Nottinghamshire.

== Wartime service ==
On completion in 1942 Wilton was sent to Scapa Flow. She took part in escort duties in support of the Russian Convoys. At the end of 1942 she served in the Mediterranean, including support for the Sicily landings in July of the following year.

In 1944 she continued operations in the Mediterranean on convoy duties, and support for operations in the Adriatic, including naval gunfire support. She remained there until February 1945 when she returned to the UK. In June 1945 she was nominated for service in the Far East and travelled to Simonstown for a refit to prepare for deployment.

== Post war ==
In 1945 and 1946 Wilton underwent a refit at Simonstown in South Africa, returning to Devonport on 10 February 1946 for transfer to the Reserve Fleet. In December 1949 she recommissioned for service with the 4th Training Flotilla at Rosyth. In 1952 she was again reduced to reserve. She was placed on the disposal list in 1959 and sold for scrapping. She arrived at the breakers yard at Faslane on 30 November 1959.

== Publications ==
- Colledge, J. J.; Warlow, Ben (2006) [1969]. Ships of the Royal Navy: The Complete Record of All Fighting Ships of the Royal Navy from the 15th Century to the Present (3rd Rev ed.). London: Chatham Publishing. ISBN 978-1-86176-281-8. OCLC 67375475.
- English, John (1987). The Hunts: A history of the design, development and careers of the 86 destroyers of this class built for the Royal and Allied Navies during World War II. World Ship Society. ISBN 0-905617-44-4.
