= HMS Nigeria =

Fiji-class cruiser

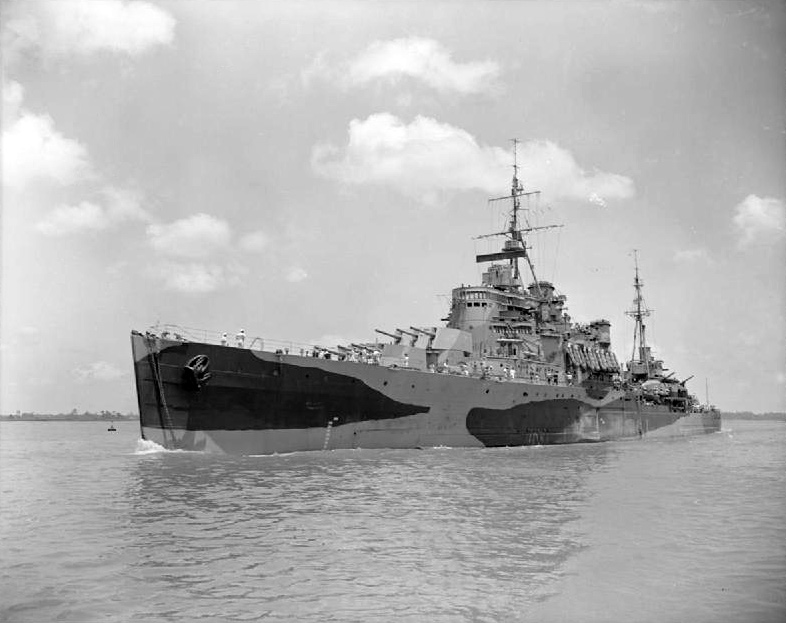
- Nigeria

History

United Kingdom
- Name: Nigeria
- Namesake: British Nigeria
- Ordered: 20 December 1937
- Builder: Vickers Armstrongs, Walker, Newcastle upon Tyne
- Laid down: 8 February 1938
- Launched: 18 July 1939
- Commissioned: 23 September 1940
- Out of service: Sold to Indian Navy as Mysore, 29 August 1957
- Honours and awards: Atlantic 1941, Norway 1941, Arctic 1942, Malta Convoys 1942, Sabang 1944, Burma 1944–45
- Badge: On a Field barry wavy of six White and Blue within two triangles Green, the Imperial Crown Proper

India
- Name: Mysore
- Acquired: 29 August 1957
- Decommissioned: 20 August 1985
- Identification: Pennant number: C60
- Fate: Scrapped, 1986

General characteristics (as built)
- Class & type: Fiji-class light cruiser
- Displacement: 8,530 long tons (8,670 t) (standard)
- Length: 555 ft 6 in (169.3 m)
- Beam: 62 ft (18.9 m)
- Draught: 19 ft 10 in (6 m)
- Installed power: 4 Admiralty 3-drum boilers; 80,000 shp (60,000 kW)
- Propulsion: 4 shafts; 4 geared steam turbine sets
- Speed: 32.25 knots (59.73 km/h; 37.11 mph)
- Range: 6,250 nmi (11,580 km; 7,190 mi) at 13 knots (24 km/h; 15 mph)
- Complement: 733 (peacetime), 900 (wartime)
- Armament: 4 × triple 6 in (152 mm) guns; 4 × twin 4 in (102 mm) DP guns; 2 × quadruple 2-pdr (40 mm (1.6 in)) AA guns; 2 × quadruple Vickers 0.5 in (12.7 mm) AA machine guns; 2 × triple 21 in (533 mm) torpedo tubes
- Armour: Engine and boiler rooms: 3.25 in (83 mm); Decks: 2–3.5 in (51–89 mm); Magazines: 2–3.5 in (51–89 mm); Gun turrets: 1–2 in (25–51 mm)
- Aircraft carried: 2 × seaplanes
- Aviation facilities: 1 × catapult, 2 × hangars

HMS Nigeria (pennant number 60) was a Fiji-class light cruiser of the Royal Navy completed early in World War II and served during that conflict. She was named after the British colony of Nigeria.

== Career ==
=== Home waters ===
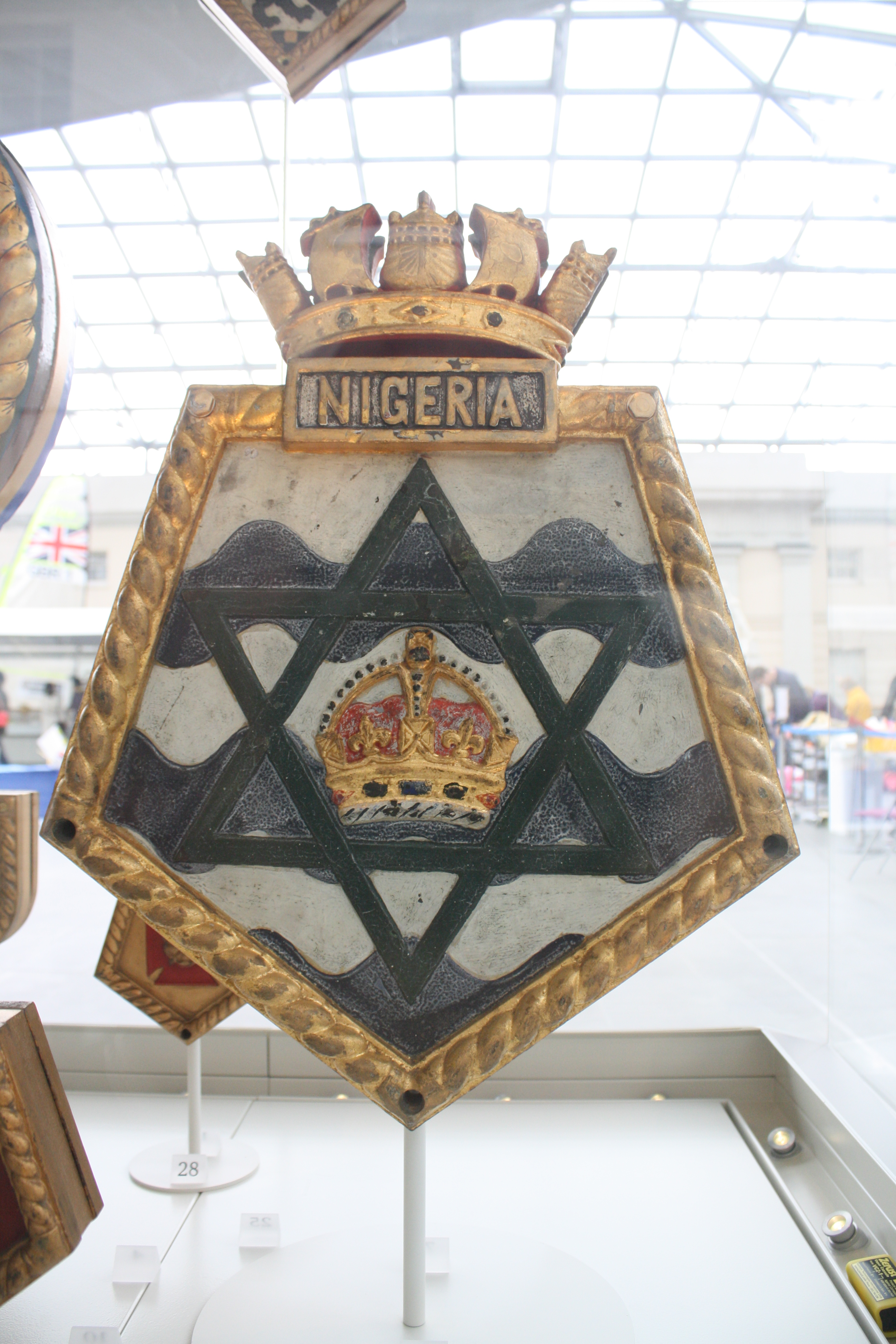
Ship's badge in the National Maritime Museum

Nigeria served in Home waters and off the Scandinavian coast for the early part of the war. On 28 June 1941 Nigeria, in company with the destroyers Bedouin, Tartar and Jupiter intercepted the German weather ship Lauenburg in thick fog north-east of Jan Mayen Island. The German ship was detected through the use of HF/DF. The crew of Lauenburg abandoned ship after they were fired upon, allowing the British to board her. Valuable codebooks and parts of the Enigma machine were found aboard and recovered. This was one of the earliest captures of Enigma material of the war, and came a few weeks after the destroyer Bulldog had captured the first complete Enigma machine from the German submarine U-110 on 9 May 1941.

In July 1941, Nigeria became the flagship of Force K, commanded by Rear Admiral Philip Vian. During this period, Force K made two expeditions to Spitsbergen (Norwegian territory), the first to ascertain the situation and the second, in September, to escort a troopship, Empress of Australia, with Canadian troops and a team of demolition experts (see Operation Gauntlet). Their task was to evacuate Norwegian and Soviet personnel from the archipelago and destroy coalmines and fuel stocks that might be of use to the enemy. Bear Island was also visited to destroy a German weather station. The two cruisers of the task force, Nigeria and Aurora diverted to intercept a German convoy. During this action, Nigeria sank the German training ship Bremse, but suffered serious damage to her bow, possibly having detonated a mine. On return to Britain, she was sent to Newcastle for repairs.

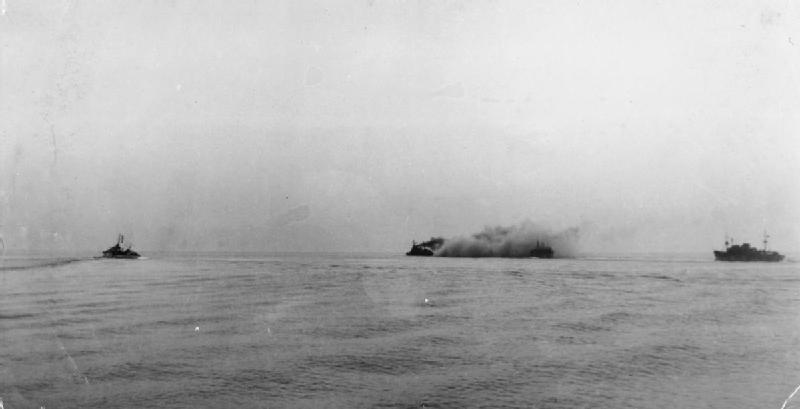
A distant view of Nigeria stopped and on fire after being torpedoed

=== The Mediterranean and Far East ===
Nigeria was then assigned to operate in the Mediterranean. On 12 August 1942 she was participating in Operation Pedestal, escorting a convoy bound for Malta. She was the flagship of the close escort group, commanded by Admiral Harold Burrough. Nigeria was torpedoed and damaged by the Italian submarine Axum but managed to make it back to Gibraltar escorted by three destroyers. 52 crew were killed in the attack. Admiral Burrough meanwhile transferred his flag to the destroyer Ashanti whilst Nigeria returned to Gibraltar.

She was sent from there to the United States for repairs, which took nine months to complete. After these were complete, she operated off the South African coast, and on 12 March 1943 she picked up 30 survivors from the American merchant James B. Stephens that was torpedoed and sunk on 8 March 1943 by the German submarine U-160 about 150 nautical miles (280 km) north-east of Durban. Nigeria was then assigned to operate with the Eastern Fleet from February 1944 until December 1945, when she returned to the UK to be refitted. During her time in the far east, she participated in raids on Sumatra.

== Post war ==
Nigeria survived the war and continued in service with the Royal Navy, as the only Colony-class cruiser, maintaining four triple 6-inch turrets, 'X' turret finally being removed in 1954. In 1954 she was sold to India and went under reconstruction, largely on the pattern of the rebuild of HMS Newfoundland, possibly incorporating some of the electronics and radar intended by the RAN to be used on the refit of HMAS Hobart, which was abandoned. On 29 August 1957 she was recommissioned into the Indian Navy, who renamed her Mysore. During her time with the Indian Navy, she collided with the destroyer HMS Hogue, severely damaging Hogue's bow. Mysore was in service for a further 28 years until she was decommissioned on 20 August 1985.
