= HMS Badsworth =

Destroyer of the Royal Navy

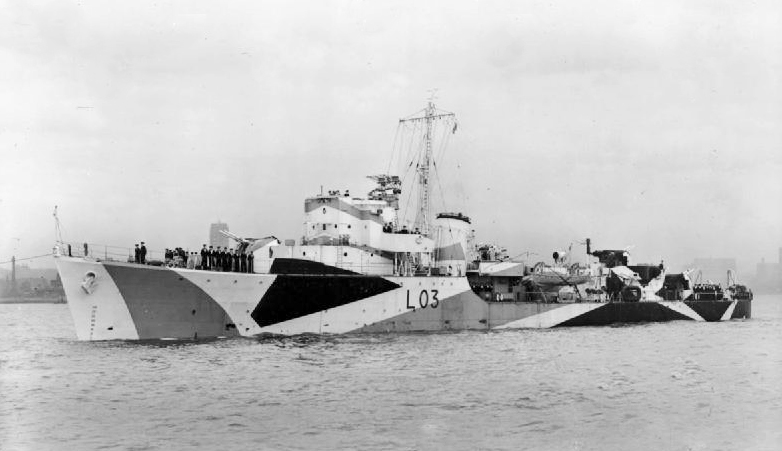
- Badsworth in dazzle camouflage under tow on the Mersey.

History

United Kingdom
- Name: HMS Badsworth
- Ordered: 20 December 1939
- Builder: Cammell Laird, Birkenhead
- Laid down: 15 May 1940
- Launched: 17 March 1941
- Commissioned: 18 August 1941
- Decommissioned: 16 November 1944
- Identification: Pennant number: L03
- Honours and awards: Atlantic 1941-43; Malta Convoys 1942; Arctic 1942
- Fate: Loaned to Norway 1944

Norway
- Name: HNoMS Arendal
- Commissioned: 8 August 1944
- Decommissioned: 1 May 1961
- Fate: Scrapped 1965

General characteristics
- Class & type: Type II Hunt-class destroyer
- Displacement: 1,050 tons standard; 1,490 tons full load
- Length: 85.34 m (280.0 ft)
- Beam: 9.62 m (31.6 ft)
- Draught: 2.51 m (8 ft 3 in)
- Propulsion: 2 shaft Parsons geared turbines; 19,000 shp
- Speed: 25.5 kn (47.2 km/h; 29.3 mph)
- Range: 3,600 nmi (6,670 km) at 14 knots (26 km/h)
- Complement: 164
- Armament: 6 × QF 4 in Mark XVI on twin mounts Mk. XIX; AAA - 2 × 4 12.7mm Vickers, 2 × 20 mm; 6 Thornycroft depth charge throwers

HMS Badsworth (pennant number L03) was an escort destroyer of the Type II Hunt class. The Royal Navy ordered Badsworth's construction three months after the outbreak of the Second World War. Cammell Laird laid down her keel at their Birkenhead yard on 15 May 1940, as Admiralty Job No. J3260 (Yard No. 1055). After a successful Warship Week national savings campaign in March 1942, Badsworth was adopted by the civil community of Batley, then in the West Riding of Yorkshire. The ship was named after a fox-hunt in Yorkshire.

Badsworth began her career on convoy duty in the North Western Approaches. However, in June 1942 she took up the role of close escort in Convoy Harpoon, aiming to deliver vital supplies to the beleaguered island of Malta. The convoy met fierce attacks from the besieging Italian and German forces with only two out of the initial six merchant ships reaching Malta. Whilst entering the Grand Harbour Badsworth struck a mine, sustaining heavy damage. She was towed back for temporary repairs, afterwards leaving the island and heading towards Tyne for further repairs. In November 1942 Badsworth rejoined the Londonderry Escort Force by escorting a convoy headed to Murmansk. In March 1943 she returned to the Mediterranean for another Malta convoy, striking another mine on 22 April 1943. Towed to Liverpool for repairs, the Badsworth was then transferred to the exiled Royal Norwegian Navy under the name HNoMS Arendal.

== Career ==
=== Early operations ===
On 18 August 1941 upon build completion, and final trials the Badsworth proceeded to Scapa Flow. Throughout September, the ship was readied for operational service, joining the Londonderry Escort Force. Badsworth was deployed for close convoy defence in the north-west approaches. On 1 October Badsworth joined convoy WS-12 in the Clyde with the destroyers Bradford, Brighton, Lancaster and Newark as local escorts during the convoy's passage in the north-western approaches, detaching from WS-12 and returning to the Clyde on 3 October.

On 13 November Badsworth joined military convoy WS-12Z in the Clyde, with Exmoor, Vanquisher, Witch and Whitehall again as local escort in the approaches, detaching from the convoy on 16 November. On 13 December Badsworth joined military convoy WS14 in its passage from the Clyde to the north west approaches for ocean escort duties with the battleship Ramillies and the destroyer Beaufort. Badsworth detached from WS-14 on 21 December with the armed merchant cruiser Cilicia, Beaufort and the local escort on arrival to Freetown.

=== Service in the Arctic ===
The passage from West Africa to resume convoy defence at Derry was completed in January 1942, with the Badsworth being deployed in continuation at Derry in February. On 23 March Badsworth joined military convoy WS-17 at the Clyde, with the destroyers Beverley, Keppel, Newport, Leamington and Volunteer as escorts during the convoy’s passage in the north western approaches. On 25 March Newport retired to the Clyde after colliding with Beverley. The local escort, Badsworth included, detached from the convoy on 27 March.

During April, Badsworth was nominated for detached service in support of a planned combined services operation, named Operation Myrmidon. The destroyer escorted the infantry landing ships Queen Emma and her sister-ship Princess Beatrix with four other Hunt-class destroyers to attack shipping in Bayonne, by Number One and Number Six Commando Units. The raid was unsuccessful both because of weather conditions and due to the enemy’s state of alert. Released early from Myrmidon, Badsworth returned to Derry, joining military convoy WS-18 on 18 April with the destroyers Georgetown, Lauderdale and Lancaster. The escorting ships detached from VB-18 with same ships and returned to Clyde.

Badsworth was then nominated for escort duties for the Russian convoy routes. On 28 April the destroyer took over ocean escort duties for the convoy PQ 15, with the cruiser Nigeria, the anti-aircraft auxiliary ship Ulster Queen, and the destroyers Boadicea, Matchless, Somali, Venomous and St Albans.^{[a]} On 2 May the Badsworth found herself under sustained attacks by aircraft and submarines. The merchant vessel Botavon was hit, and settled down by her bow. The merchantman sank slowly, and Badsworth was ordered to sink her by gunfire. During one of these sorties, Badsworth dropped depth charges, seeing a periscope shortly afterwards she counterattacked, dropping two Patterns. The destroyer reported that the submarine blew its tanks, but nothing appeared. Badsworth was unable to further the attack as the destroyer's asdic broke down.

The day after, Badsworth assisted in the rescue of survivors from the British merchantmen Cape Corso and Jutland which were sunk by air attacks. On 5 May the destroyer was detached from PQ 15 upon arrival at Murmansk. Badsworth remained in North Russia until 21 May, when she joined the ocean escort for the return convoy QP-12, with Ulster Queen, the destroyers Venomous, Boadicea, Escapade, Inglefield and St Albans. The convoy also included the minesweeper Harrier and three trawlers. On 27 May, Badsworth detached herself from the convoy, along with Venomous and Ulster Queen.

=== Escort and patrol duties in the Mediterranean ===
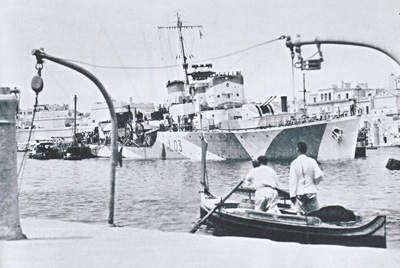
Badsworth after being hit by a mine near the Grand Harbour.

On 29 May, Badsworth was chosen for far escort duties of supply convoy to Malta, as part of Operation Harpoon. After preparing for the Mediterranean duties at Derry, on 6 June the destroyer joined Convoy WS-19S in the north west approaches as part of Ocean Escort for passage to Gibraltar. On 12 June, Badsworth joined the cruiser Cairo, with a covering destroyer flotilla made up of the destroyers Bedouin, Marne, Matchless, Partridge, Ithuriel, Blankney, Middleton and ORP Kujawiak. Also part of Force X charged with leading the convoy to Malta were the minesweepers Hebe, Speedy, Hythe and Rye. The ships set out of Gibraltar escorting the convoy through the Sicilian narrows.

On 14 June, Badsworth was under heavy air attack, which damaged Liverpool forcing her return to Gibraltar. The day after found the convoy in action with Italian warships in their attempt to intercept and sink the convoy. On 16 June, Badsworth suffered major structural damage after she detonated a mine whilst entering Grand Harbour, Malta. The destroyer entered the harbour with the two merchantmen that survived the convoy. The ships’ night time arrival, along with errors in the signals received for a mine-swept path caused the convoy to pass through a minefield. ORP Kujawiak was sunk after detonating a mine, while Matchless, the minesweeper Hebe and the merchantman Orari were also damaged.

Badsworth had twelve by fifteen foot gash torn in her forward structure below the waterline. Among the fourteen casualties were some survivors from the merchant ships sunk during the passage to Malta. The day after the arrival, the destroyer was docked and taken for repairs at HM Dockyard, Malta. Temporary repairs to allow a return to Great Britain took until 11 August, when Badsworth left Malta, along with the Matchless as escorts for two merchantmen to Gibraltar. The ships were tagged as Force Y, as part of Operation Ascendant. These ships were the only remaining survivors of the Harpoon convoy. Their passage back to Gibraltar was deliberately planned to coincide with that of the next Malta relief convoy, Operation Pedestal. During the passage close to the North African coast, Italian recognition marks were painted on Badsworth’s forecastle. The ships arrived at Gibraltar on 15 August, with Badsworth leaving harbour three days later, heading for the United Kingdom for repairs. On 25 August, Badsworth entered the North Shields commercial shipyard for repairs.

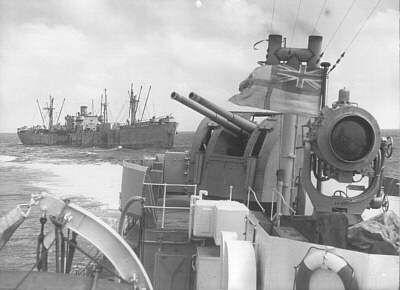
Badsworth on 14 April 1943 escorting a Liberty-ship en route to North Africa.

Repairs continued until November, with post refit trails and the preparations for operational service ending in December. Badsworth rejoined the Londonderry Escort Force for convoy defence in the North Atlantic. On 18 December, the destroyer joined the military convoy WS25 with the destroyers Haydon and Wolverine as escort for the convoy’s route to Freetown. Badsworth detached from WS-25 along with the other destroyers and returned to the Clyde on 24 December.

From January to February 1943, Badsworth continued to provide defence for Atlantic convoys. However, she was transferred to the Mediterranean for escort and support duties with the 60th Destroyer Division. On 16 March, as Badsworth was prepared for foreign service, she joined the joint military convoy WS-28/KMF-11 in the Clyde with the Polish destroyer Krakowiak, and the Royal Navy destroyers Douglas, Eggesford, Goathland, Whaddon and the sloops Woodpecker and Wren as escorts during the convoy’s Atlantic passage. Badsworth then detached from the joint convoy with other ships bound for Gibraltar, as part of KMF11.

Badsworth was thence deployed in the Western Mediterranean for convoy defence and patrol. On 22 April, she was mined at Bône, Algeria, sustaining major structural damage in her aft section. Badsworth’s starboard engine was immobilised, with both shafts distorted. The ship was beached, and had to be refloated and towed back into harbour by the minesweeper Clacton. Temporary repairs were made in Malta during May, upon completion Badsworth was towed back to the United Kingdom by the tug Frisky as part of Convoy MKS-15. The destroyer was taken in hand for extensive repairs at a commercial shipyard in Liverpool in July. The destroyer was paid off from Royal Navy service and transferred on loan to the Royal Norwegian Navy on 8 August 1944. Badsworth was renamed as HNoMS Arendal. The ship was decommissioned from the Royal Navy on 16 November 1944.

=== Duties under Norwegian command, and later career ===
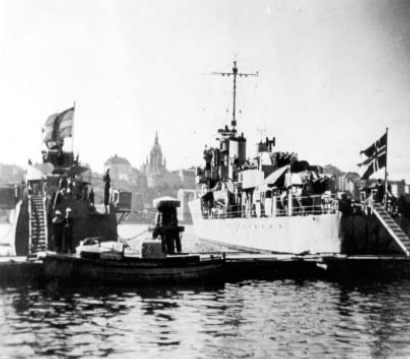
Arendal at Kastellholmen, Stockholm.

In September, Arendal was nominated for duty with the 16th Destroyer Flotilla, based at Harwich, after completing the shipyard work, carrying out the harbour trial, a post refit trial, the destroyer was ready again for operational service, joining the flotilla at Harwich for patrol and escort duties in the North Sea and the Channel.

The destroyer saw action on 25 March 1945 against minelaying E-Boats in the Thames Estuary with the Polish destroyer ORP Krakowiak. The continuation of the ship’s loan to the Royal Norwegian Navy was approved after VE Day, with the ship continuing to be deployed with the Royal Norwegian Navy on loan from the Royal Navy. Arendal was a destroyer escort in Operation Kingdom, the embarkation of the Crown Prince of Norway aboard HMS Ariadne for his return to Oslo. After her return to Norway Arendal made a return trip to the UK, when she sailed in September 1945 to Leith and retrieved 400 urns containing the ashes of Norwegians who had died in the UK during the war. The urns were placed 40 each in 10 crates on the aft deck, each of the crates decorated with a large flower bouquet. Before the ship left port with her cargo a Norwegian priest belonging to the Norwegian Church Abroad held a service on board. When the destroyer arrived in Oslo she was met by King Haakon VII, Crown Prince Olav, Prince Harald and Bishop Eivind Berggrav, as well as military units and a large crowd of people. Arendal also escorted landing vessels from the United Kingdom to Norway, the landing vessels having been bought by the Norwegian government for conversion to coastal ferries and cargo vessels. On several occasions Arendal sailed to Germany, escorting vessels carrying German soldiers being repatriated to Bremerhaven in north-western Germany. Arendal was bought by Norway after the end of hostilities, in 1946. The ship remained in operational use as an escort destroyer until 1956, when she was classified as a frigate. Arendal was used as a training ship for cadets, before being removed from the active list in 1961. She was scrapped in 1965.

== Notes ==
a. The Royal Navy submarine HMS Sturgeon was also present with the convoy initially, as was the cruiser HMS London. Transit of the convoy was partially covered by ships of the Home Fleet.

== Bibliography ==
- Admiralty (1942), ADM199/721: P.Q. and Q.P. convoys: reports, HM Stationery Office
- Brooke, Ewart (1962), Destroyer, Jarrolds, ISBN 0-09-906800-1
- Bjørnsson, Nils (1994), Å være eller ikke være - Under orlogsflagget i den annen verdenskrig, Sjømilitære Samfund ved Norsk Tidsskrift for Sjøvesen, ISBN 82-990969-3-6
- Bradford, Ernle (2003), Siege: Malta 1940-1943, Pen and Sword, ISBN 0-85052-930-1
- Cocker, Maurice (1981), Destroyers of the Royal Navy, 1893-1981, Ian Allan, ISBN 0-7110-1075-7
- English, John (1987), The Hunts: a history of the design, development and careers of the 86 destroyers of this class built for the Royal and Allied Navies during World War II, World Ship Society, ISBN 0-905617-44-4
- Jane, Frederick Thomas (1968), Jane's Fighting Ships, Marston and Co.
- Macksey, Kenneth (1986), Commando: hit-and-run combat in World War II, Part 794, Stein and Day
- Madsen, Chris (1998), The Royal Navy and German naval disarmament, 1942-1947, Taylor & Francis, Inc., ISBN 978-0-7146-4823-1
- Peregontsev, A.S. (1999), Korabli Vtoroi Mirovoi Voiny, 1939-1945: Spravochnik, Volume I, Izdatel' Peregontsev V.S.
- Rohwer, Jürgen (1977), The critical convoy battles of March 1943: the battle for HX.229/SC122, Naval Institute Press, ISBN 978-0-87021-818-7
- Rohwer J., Jürgen; Hümmelchen, Gerhard (1992), Chronology of the War at Sea 1939–1945: The Naval History of World War Two, Naval Institute Press, ISBN 978-1-55750-105-9
- Schofield Betham, Brian (1977), The Arctic convoys, Macdonald and Jane's, ISBN 978-0-354-01112-9
- Smith, Peter Charles (1984), Hold the narrow sea: naval warfare in the English Channel, 1939-1945, Moorland, ISBN 0-86190-079-0
- Smith, Peter Charles (1970), Pedestal: the Malta convoy of August, 1942, Kimber, ISBN 978-0-7183-0032-6
