= SS Empire Conrad =

Cargo ship built in 1942

History
- Name: Empire Conrad (1942–1952); Franta (1952); Nia (1952–1954); Eugenia (1954–1967)
- Owner: Ministry of War Transport (1942–1945); Ministry of Transport (1945–1952); P Atychiades (1952); Refast Steamship Co (1952–1954); Ocean Tramp Tankers Corporation (1954–1967)
- Operator: Glen & Co Ltd (1942–1952); P Atychiades (1952); Refast Steamship Co (1952–1954); Ocean Tramp Tankers Corporation (1954–1967)
- Port of registry: (United Kingdom) Greenock (1942–1952); (France) Marseille (1952–1954); (Liberia) Monrovia (1954–1967)
- Builder: Lithgows Ltd
- Yard number: 963
- Launched: 23 March 1942
- Completed: May 1942
- Out of service: April 1967
- Identification: Code Letters BDTJ (1942–1954); United Kingdom Official Number 168983 (1942–1954)
- Fate: Scrapped

General characteristics
- Type: Cargo ship
- Tonnage: 7,009 GRT; 4,972 NRT
- Length: 434 ft 0 in (132.28 m)
- Beam: 56 ft 2 in (17.12 m)
- Draught: 26 ft 3 in (8.00 m)
- Depth: 34 ft 2 in (10.41 m)
- Installed power: Triple expansion steam engine
- Propulsion: Screw propeller

Empire Conrad was a 7,009 GRT cargo ship that was built in 1942 by Charles Connell & Co Ltd, Clydebank for the Ministry of War Transport (MoWT). She was sold to a French company in 1952 and renamed Franta and then resold later that year and renamed Nia. In 1954, she was sold to a Panamanian company and renamed Eugenia. She served until 1967, when she was scrapped.

== Description ==
The ship was built by Lithgow's Ltd, Port Glasgow, as yard number 963. She was launched on 23 March 1942, and completed in May.

The ship was 434 feet 9 inches (132.51 m) long, with a beam of 56 feet 2 inches (17.12 m). The ship had a depth of 34 feet 2 inches (10.41 m) and a draught of 26 feet 3 inches (8.00 m). The ship had a GRT of 7,009 and a NRT of 4,972.

The ship was propelled by a triple expansion steam engine, which had cylinders of 23 1/2 inches (60 cm), 37 1/2 inches (95 cm) and 68 inches (170 cm) diameter by 48 inches (120 cm) stroke. The engine was built by J G Kincaird & Co Ltd, Greenock.

== History ==
Empire Conrad was built in 1942 for the MoWT. She was placed under the management of Glen & Co Ltd. The Code Letters BDTG and United Kingdom Official Number 168983 were allocated. Her port of registry was Greenock.

On 20 May 1942, Empire Conrad departed from Milford Haven, Wales with a cargo of 32 Spitfires in cases. The aircraft were all Spitfire Mk VcT. Also on board were the ground crew who were to assemble them, a total of over 110 men. Empire Conrad was escorted by the 29th ML Flotilla and the corvette Spirea. The convoy was later joined by the Minesweepers Hythe and Rye. Empire Conrad arrived at Gibraltar on 27 May. The aircraft were transferred to the aircraft carrier Eagle where they were assembled. On 2 June, Eagle departed from Gibraltar escorted by the cruiser Charybdis and destroyers Antelope, Ithuriel, Partridge, Westcott and Wishart. On 3 June, the aircraft were flown off Eagle bound for Malta. Twenty-eight of them arrived safely, with the other four being shot down en route.

Empire Conrad was a member of Convoy HG 84, which departed from Gibraltar on 10 June 1942, and arrived at Liverpool on 20 June. She was carrying iron pyrites and a general cargo and was bound for Leith and Hull.

Empire Conrad was a member of Convoy KMS 15, which departed the United Kingdom on 1 June 1943 bound for Gibraltar and the Mediterranean. She joined the convoy at Tripoli, Libya and left it at Port Said, Egypt.

Empire Conrad was a member of Convoy MKS 21, which departed from Alexandria, Egypt on 3 August 1943 and arrived at Gibraltar on 14 August, departing later that day for Liverpool, where it arrived on 25 August. Empire Conrad joined at Gibraltar, she was carrying a cargo of scrap metal and was bound for Manchester. In 1945, Empire Conrad was a member of Convoy KMS 92G, which detached from Convoy OS 118 at sea on 29 March.

On 31 December 1945, Empire Perdita was reported to be adrift in the Mozambique Channel, 200 nautical miles (370 km) north east of Durban, South Africa. Empire Conrad went to her assistance. In 1952, Empire Conrad was sold to P Atychiades, Marseille, France and was renamed Franta. She was sold in 1954 to the Refast Steamship Co and was renamed Nia. She was operated under the management of Marcou & Sons Ltd, London. Later that year, she was sold to Ocean Tramp Tankers Corporation, Panama and was renamed Eugenia. She was reflagged to Liberia. In November 1956, Eugenia was one of a number of ships trapped in the Suez Canal, Egypt. She served until 1967, and was scrapped at Niihama, Japan in April 1967.
