= Operation Harpoon (1942) =

British operation during the Second World War

Operation Harpoon/The Battle of Pantelleria
- Part of the Battle of the Mediterranean of the Second World War
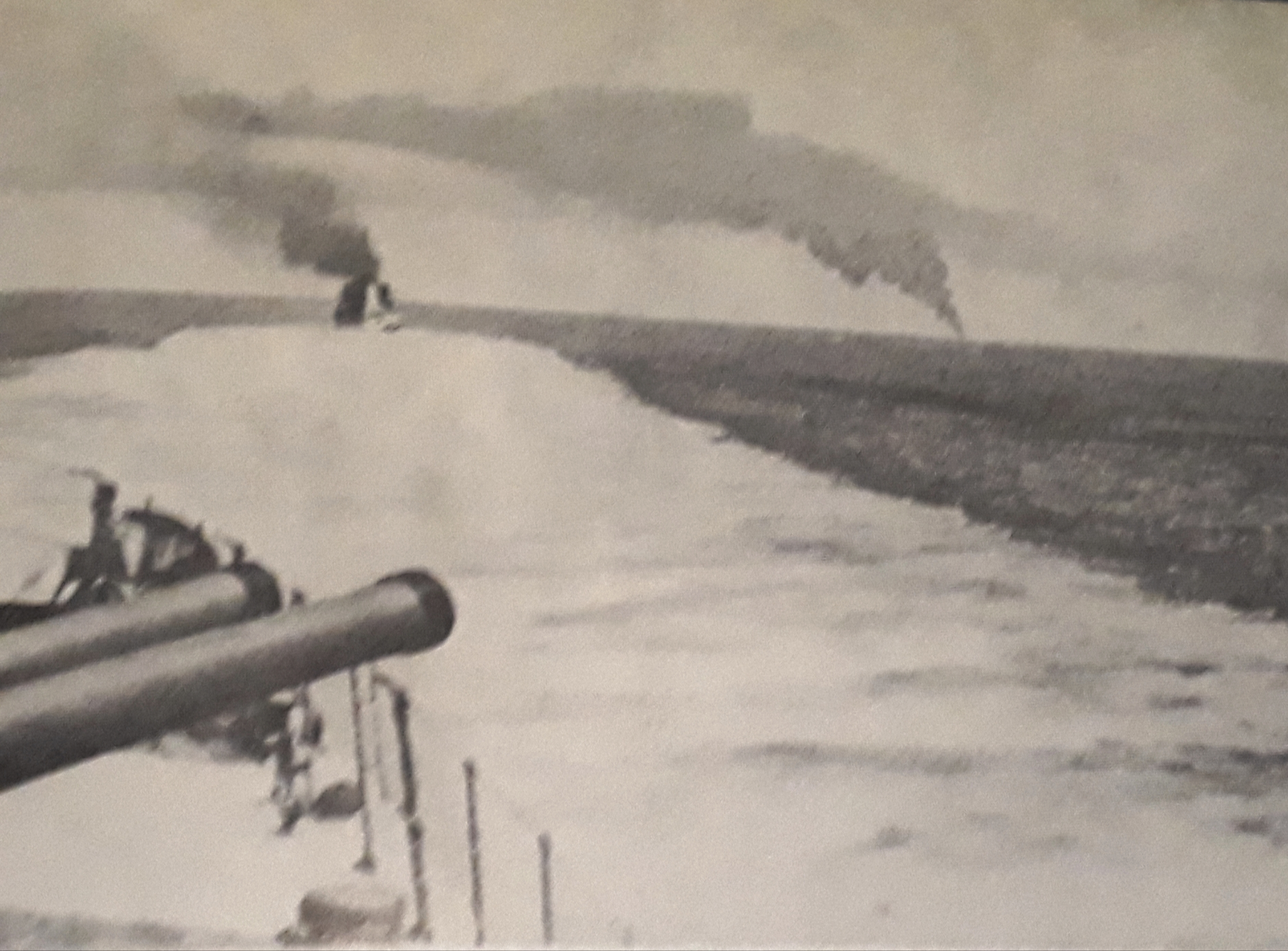
- Italian destroyers heading towards the stragglers of the Allied convoy
| Date | 12–15 June 1942 |
| Location | Western Mediterranean, towards Malta 36°12′0″N 11°38′0″E |
| Result | Italian–German victory |

Belligerents
| United Kingdom; Poland | Italy; Germany |

Commanders and leaders
| Alban Curteis; Cecil Hardy | Alberto da Zara |

Strength
| 2 aircraft carriers; 1 battleship; 4 light cruisers; 1 minelayer; 17 destroyers; 4 minesweepers; 6 motor launches; 6 merchant ships | 2 light cruisers; 5 destroyers; aircraft |

Casualties and losses
| 101+ killed; 20+ wounded; 217 (POW); 2 destroyers sunk; 4 merchant ships sunk; 2 light cruisers damaged; 3 destroyers damaged; 1 minesweeper damaged; 1 merchant ship damaged | 12 killed; 1 destroyer damaged; 29 aircraft destroyed |
- The Island of Pantelleria in the Strait of Sicily, central Mediterranean

Operation Harpoon (Battle of Pantelleria (Battaglia di Mezzo Giugno [Battle of mid-June]) was part of Operation Julius, two simultaneous Allied convoys sent to supply Malta in the Axis-dominated central Mediterranean Sea in mid-June 1942, during the Second World War.

Operation Vigorous was a west-bound convoy from Alexandria and Operation Harpoon was an east-bound convoy from Gibraltar. Vigorous was driven back by the battle fleet of the Regia Marina after massed attacks by Axis aircraft. Two of the six ships in the Harpoon convoy completed the journey, at the cost of several Allied warships.

News of the two operations had been unwittingly revealed to the Axis by the US Military Attaché in Egypt, Colonel Bonner Fellers, who had been submitting detailed military reports on British activities to Washington. The American code was later revealed by Ultra intercepts to have been broken by Italian military intelligence (the Servizio Informazioni Militare).

== Background ==
=== Malta ===
==== Siege, 1942 ====
In 1942, Axis bombing of Malta smashed the docks, ships, aircraft and airfields by the end of April 1942. Axis bombing was switched to targets preliminary to invasion: camps, barracks, warehouses and road junctions. After 18 April, German bombing suddenly stopped and Italian bombers took over, regularly bombing with small formations of aircraft. During the month, Axis aircraft flew more than 9,500 sorties against 388 by the Royal Air Force (RAF) all but 30 of which were fighter sorties. The British lost 50 aircraft, 20 shot down in combat against 37 Axis losses incurred during the dropping of 6,700 long tons (6,808 t) of bombs, three times the March figure, 3,000 long tons (3,048 t) on the docks, 2,600 long tons (2,642 t) on airfields. The bombing demolished or damaged 11,450 buildings, 300 civilians were killed and 350 seriously wounded. Good shelters existed but some of the casualties were caused by delayed-action bombs.

As Malta was running short of supplies, Convoy MW 10 sailed from Alexandria on 21 March. The convoy was the subject of a half-hearted attack by the Italian Fleet; the Italians intercepted the convoy and inflicted much damage on several escorts in the Second Battle of Sirte but the weaker British force fended off the Italian squadron. The attack on the convoy meant that the convoy reached Malta in the morning and not at night as expected, leaving the merchant ships exposed to Axis air attack. In the following 48 hours, all the merchant ships were sunk off Malta or destroyed inside the port; barely 5,000 long tons (5,100 t) of supplies were unloaded.

Rations of meat, fats and sugar were cut further and on 5 May, the bread ration was reduced to 10.5 oz (298 g) per day, enough to last until late July; pasta rations had already been stopped and there had been a poor winter potato harvest. Three destroyers, three submarines, three minesweepers, five tugs, a water carrier and a floating crane were sunk in port and more ships damaged. The island continued to function as a staging post but the Axis bombing campaign neutralised Malta as an offensive base. Two boats of the 10th Submarine Flotilla had been sunk, two were damaged in harbour and on 26 April the flotilla was ordered out because of mining by small fast craft, which were undetectable by radar and inaudible during the bombing; the surviving minesweepers were too reduced in numbers to clear the approaches. Three reconnaissance aircraft remained and only 22 bomber sorties were flown, with eleven more by Fleet Air Arm (FAA) aircraft during the month. By the start of June, only two Fairey Albacores and two Fairey Swordfish were left.

==== Offensive operations ====
Libya location map

From December 1941, Luftwaffe bombing neutralised Malta, decrypts of Italian C 38m cipher messages showed more sailings and fewer losses and on 23 February 1942, an Italian convoy, led by the battleship Duilio, reached Tripoli. By the end of February, 11 ships had crossed without escort and a blackout caused by a change to the C 38m machine, in early March, made little difference to the British for lack of means. After the British broke back into C 38m, 26 Axis supply journeys had been made by May, only nine being spotted by air reconnaissance. On 14 April, five Malta aircraft were shot down and the submarine HMS Upholder was lost. On 10 March, the cruiser HMS Naiad was sunk by a U-boat and on 10 May, three of four destroyers were sunk by the Luftwaffe. In February and March, Axis losses were 9 per cent of supplies sent, in April less than one per cent and May losses were 7 per cent.

The Axis was able to reinforce North Africa sufficient for General Erwin Rommel to try to attack before the British. In late April, the British Chiefs of Staff ruled that there would be no convoy to Malta in May, because the Italian fleet could be expected to sail and convoy would need battleship and aircraft carrier cover, which was not available. An operation to fly Spitfires to Malta succeeded and anti-aircraft ammunition was to be supplied by fast minelayer, with which Malta must hold on until mid-June, when the situation in the Western Desert should have been clarified. If Martuba or Benghazi in Cyrenaica had been captured by the Eighth Army, a westbound convoy from Alexandria might survive without cover from battleships and aircraft carriers. It would also be known if Luftwaffe aircraft had been diverted to the Russian Front and if the crisis in the Indian Ocean had abated, sufficient for ships to escort a fast convoy from Alexandria.

==== Unternehmen Herkules ====
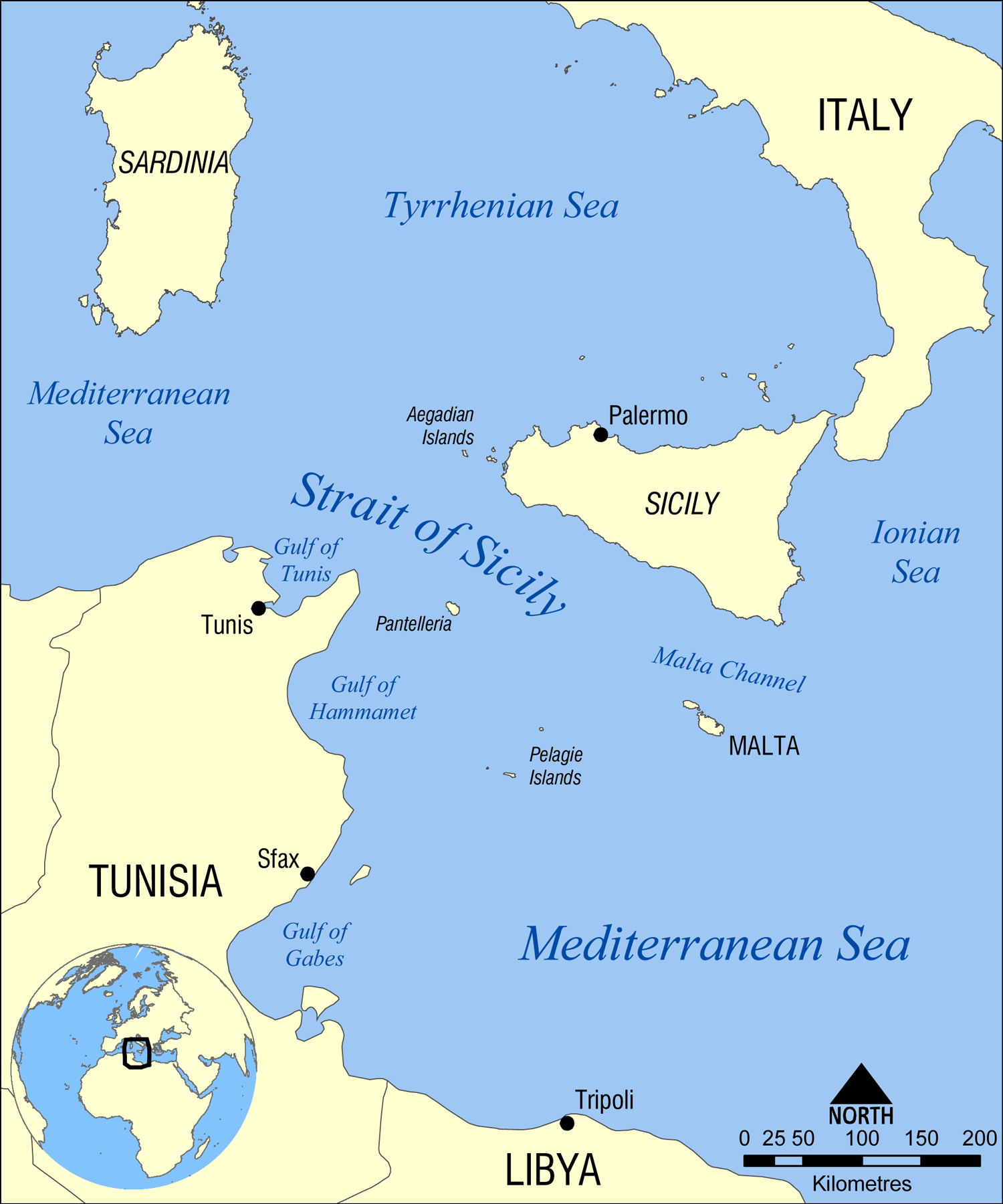
Map of the central Mediterranean

Operation Hercules (Operazione C3) was an Axis plan to invade Malta and during 1942, reinforcement of the Luftwaffe in Sicily and the bombing campaign against the island led to speculation that it was the prelude to invasion. Gleanings from prisoners of war and diplomatic sources led to a certain apprehension about the meaning of troop movements in southern Italy. The absence of evidence from signals intelligence and air reconnaissance led to a conclusion that an invasion was not imminent but the need to protect the source of information meant that this was not disclosed by the British. That preparations were being made were revealed on 7 February through the decryption of Luftwaffe Enigma messages but by 23 March the invasion scare had died down and more bombing was expected. By 31 March the progress of the Axis bombing campaign led to a prediction that the attempt would be made in April but this was soon discounted.

Although the bombing increased from 750 long tons (762 t) in February, to 2,000 long tons (2,032 t) in March and 5,500 long tons (5,588 t) in April, Enigma decodes showed that there were still 425 Luftwaffe aircraft in Sicily, not the 650 aircraft originally intended, because aircraft were detained in Russia by the Soviet winter offensive. On 26 April, Enigma revealed that Fliegerkorps II was being withdrawn. By 2 May, a Luftwaffe bomber group and a fighter group had been withdrawn with more to follow, which explained the lull. Hitler was lukewarm about the operation, in case the Italian navy let down the Fallschirmjäger (parachute and glider troops) but the Axis capture of Tobruk in mid-June made it appear that an invasion was redundant. Hitler and Mussolini agreed to Panzerarmee Afrika pursuing the British into Egypt for the rest of June and into July, which meant cancelling Hercules.

=== Western Desert Campaign ===
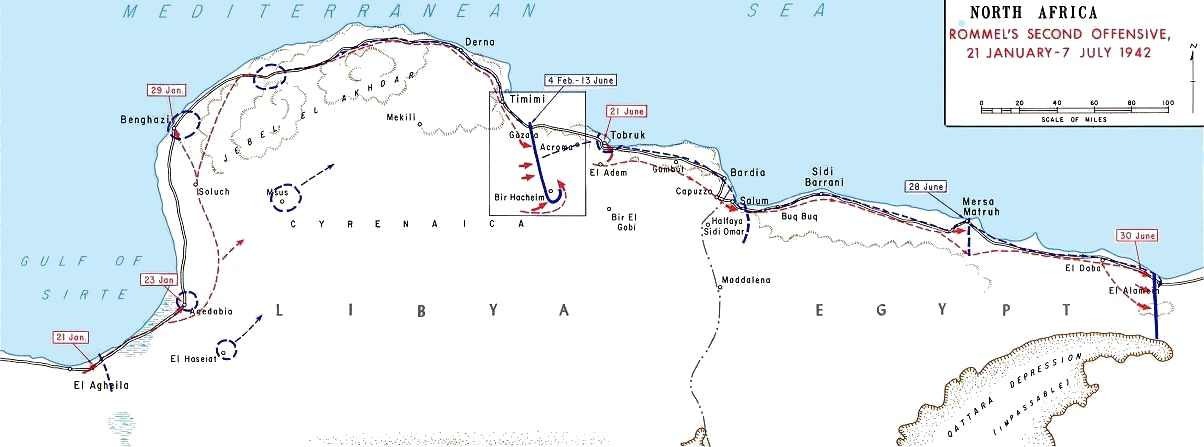
Course of the desert war, showing the British loss of Libyan and Egyptian airfields after the Battle of Gazala

After the success of Operation Crusader (18 November – 30 December 1941), the Eighth Army advanced 800 km (500 mi) westwards to El Agheila in Libya, capturing airfields and landing grounds to provide air cover for Malta convoys. The British misjudged the speed of Axis reinforcement and expected to attack well before the Axis but Panzerarmee Afrika forestalled the Eighth Army by beginning an offensive on 21 January 1942. By 6 February, the British had been defeated, forced to retreat east of the Jebel Akhdar back to the Gazala line just west of Tobruk, where the Panzerarmee had begun its retirement seven weeks earlier. At the Battle of Gazala (26 May – 21 June), Panzerarmee Afrika attacked first again but appeared close to defeat until 11 June. The Allied Operation Julius began on the same day as the Afrika Korps broke out and by 14 June, forced the British to retreat towards Tobruk. The Axis forces pursued the British into Egypt and the Desert Air Force lost the Libyan landing grounds from which to cover Malta convoys.

== Prelude ==
=== Operation Julius ===
Two weeks before the convoys, the carrier HMS Eagle began operations to deliver 63 Spitfires to Malta, which increased the number to 95 serviceable fighters. Air operations for the two convoys began on 24 May, when Wellington bombers of 104 Squadron from Malta began bombing airfields and ports in Sicily and southern Italy. On 11 June, the Wellingtons were withdrawn to accommodate six Wellington torpedo bombers of 38 Squadron, Beaufort torpedo-bombers of 217 Squadron and Baltimore reconnaissance aircraft of 69 Squadron. Aircraft from Gibraltar, Malta and Egypt began reconnaissance flights on 11 June, searching for the Italian fleet. Twelve Beauforts of 39 Squadron were based at Bir Amud in Egypt, near the Libyan border, five B-24 Liberator bombers of 160 Squadron and about 24 aircraft of the Halverson Detachment United States Army Air Forces (USAAF) at RAF Fayid, were also made available.

Short-range fighters based in Palestine, Egypt, Cyrenaica and Malta were to provide air cover and as the convoy moved out of range, protection would be taken over by Kittyhawks of 250 Squadron equipped with long-range fuel tanks, Beaufighters from 252 Squadron and 272 Squadron and Beaufighter night fighters from 227 Squadron. Air cover from Cyrenaica could not overlap with coverage from Malta leaving a gap but Wellingtons of 205 Group and the light bombers of the Desert Air Force would attack Axis airfields in North Africa. No. 201 (General Reconnaissance) Group was to provide maritime reconnaissance and anti-submarine sorties and a small sabotage party was to land on Crete and attack Axis aircraft on the ground.

==== Operation Vigorous ====
Vigorous was planned as a joint Royal Navy–RAF operation, to be conducted from the headquarters of 201 (General Reconnaissance) Group by Vice-Admiral Henry Harwood and Air Marshal Arthur Tedder, with Rear-Admiral Philip Vian in command of the convoy and escorts (Force A). If a larger Italian force attacked, Vian was to protect the convoy with smoke and the escorts were to repulse the attackers with torpedoes and try to inflict early casualties against two of the Italian ships using gunfire. The success of the convoy would depend on the Italian fleet being damaged by air and submarine attack before it could close on the ships, rather than on surface action because the battleships HMS Queen Elizabeth and Valiant were still out of action. Force A comprised four Dido-class 5.25-inch light cruisers and an anti-aircraft C-class cruiser, three 6-inch Town-class cruisers and 26 destroyers, four corvettes, two minesweepers, four Motor Torpedo Boats (MTB) and two rescue ships. The old battleship HMS Centurion was pressed into service to masquerade as a contemporary battleship. Two submarine flotillas were to send nine boats to screen the convoy and to patrol areas that the Italian fleet was likely to be found.

=== Convoy ===
==== 12 June ====
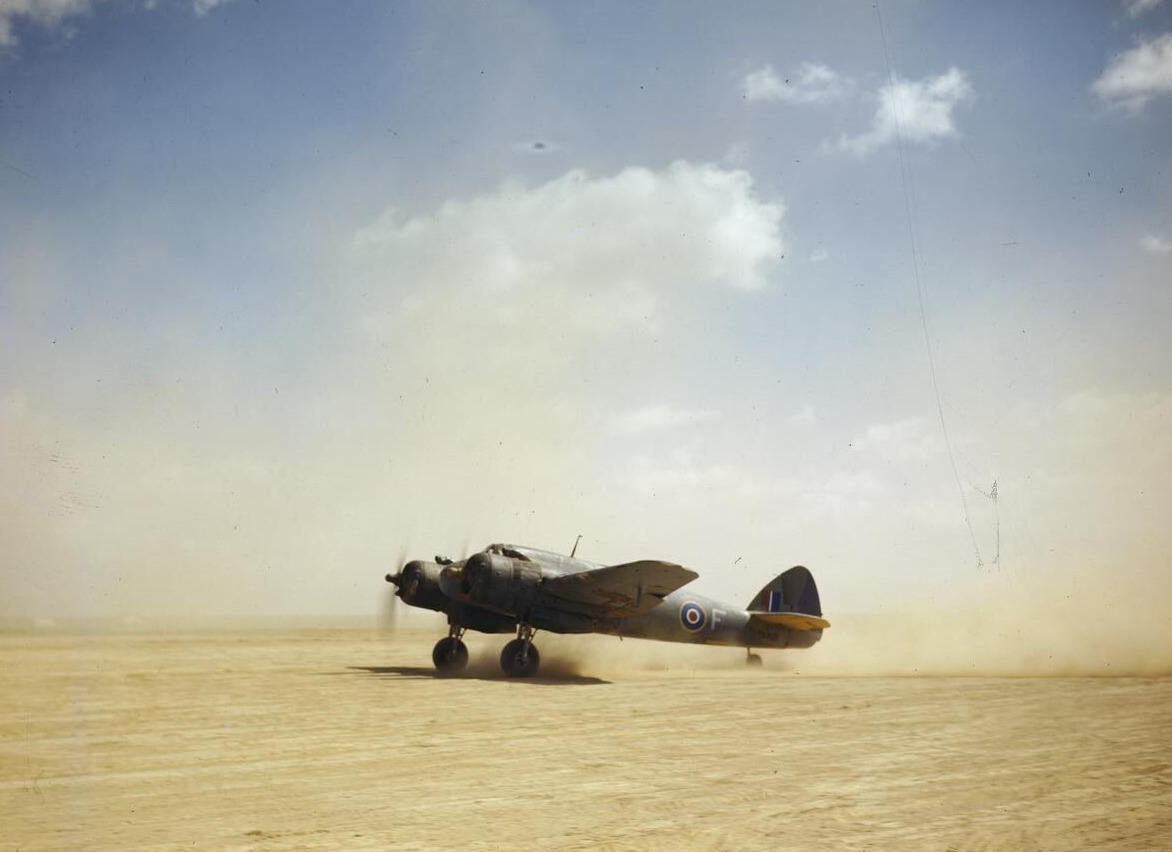
A Bristol Beaufighter Mk 1 of 252 Squadron based in North Africa

Convoy MW4 left Gibraltar on 12 June 1942, with the British Troilus, Burdwan and Orari, the Dutch Tanimbar, the American Chant and the tanker Kentucky that carried 43,000 short tons (39,000 t) of cargo and oil. The convoy was escorted by Force X, the anti-aircraft cruiser HMS Cairo, nine destroyers, the fast minelayer HMS Welshman and smaller ships. Distant cover was provided by the battleship HMS Malaya, the aircraft carriers Argus and Eagle, the cruisers HMS Kenya, Charybdis and Liverpool, with several destroyers. Eagle carried 16 Sea Hurricanes of 801 Naval Air Squadron (801 NAS) and 813 NAS and four Fairey Fulmars of 807 NAS. Argus had two more Fulmars of 807 NAS and 18 Swordfish of 824 NAS.

==== 14 June ====
The convoy was attacked by the Italian submarine Uarsciek at 2:52 a.m. which claimed a hit but the explosion was premature. At dawn an Italian aircraft spotted the convoy 50 nmi (93 km; 58 mi) north of Cape Bougaroni, about halfway between Algiers and Bizerte. Two British fighters managed to shoot it down before it could send a sighting report. Escapade fired on a submarine but it turned out to be Westcott returning from refuelling. The Italian submarine Giada was in the vicinity and at 6:05 a.m. fired two torpedoes at Eagle, which logged an underwater explosion at 6:14 a.m. The crew of Giada heard three explosions and claimed a hit. Another Italian aircraft saw the convoy at 7:45 a.m. 90 nmi (100 mi; 170 km) south-west of Cape Teulada in Sardinia, close to the operational area of Aeronautica della Sardegna (Air Sardinia) which had been reinforced to 175 operational bombers and fighters, a greater force than anticipated by the British. The first air attacks were made by Italian Savoia-Marchetti SM.79 torpedo bombers, which sank Tanimbar, south of Sardinia. Liverpool was damaged and towed back to Gibraltar by Antelope, under air attack (arriving on 17 June). Later on 14 June, the covering force returned to Gibraltar, short of the Strait of Sicily. The fast minelayer Welshman was detached and travelled to Malta alone, delivered ammunition, then sailed back next day to rejoin the convoy escorts.

==== 15 June ====
Light cruiser Eugenio di Savoia, flagship of Admiral da Zara

At dawn on 15 June, near Pantelleria, the lightly defended convoy was subjected to a coordinated attack by Axis aircraft and the Italian 7th Cruiser Division (Ammiraglio di divisione [Vice-Admiral] Alberto da Zara), Raimondo Montecuccoli, Eugenio di Savoia and the destroyers Ascari, Alfredo Oriani, Lanzerotto Malocello, Premuda and Ugolino Vivaldi. The five fleet destroyers in the convoy escort made a smokescreen and attacked the Italian squadron but the Tribal-class destroyer HMS Bedouin and the P-class destroyer Partridge were repeatedly hit by the Italian cruisers and brought to a standstill. The cruiser Cairo also received two rounds from Italian gunfire. Italian reports claimed that the destroyers Vivaldi and Malocello closed to within 6,000 yd (3.4 mi; 5.5 km) of the merchantmen and hit one of the freighters at about 7:15 a.m. Vivaldi was eventually hit by a shot from the British destroyers and caught fire but was taken in tow and saved by Malocello and Premuda. Both forces broke off the engagement at about 8:00 a.m. and the Italians lost track of the convoy.

The 9,308 long tons (9,457 t) tanker Kentucky, Chant and the freighter Burdwan, already disabled by air attack, were abandoned by their escorts, which had been trying to scuttle Kentucky and Burdwan with gunfire and depth charges, when the Italian cruisers returned shortly before noon. Burdwan and Kentucky, already on fire, were sunk by gunfire and torpedoes from Raimondo Montecuccoli, Eugenio di Savoia and the destroyers Ascari and Oriani; Kentucky was also struck by a torpedo from Oriani. Likewise, Ascari torpedoed the blazing hull of Burdwan. Chant had already been sunk by bombing and the Italian squadron found her smouldering wreck site. While scaring off the small escorting vessels of the crippled ships and according to post-battle reports from both sides, Raimondo Montecuccoli hit the minesweeper HMS Hebe at "approx. 26,000 yards". Fires broke out on Hebe, which received extensive splinter damage.

Partridge was recovered and taking the disabled Bedouin in tow when the Italian cruisers with two destroyers reappeared; the tow was cast off, leaving Bedouin adrift. At 2:30 p.m., Partridge managed to withdraw and run for Gibraltar but Bedouin had already been hit during the battle by at least twelve 152 mm (6.0 in) shells plus several near misses and had taken on a severe list. Bedouin was eventually sunk by an aerial torpedo from a SM.79 bomber that Bedouin shot down as it sank. Twenty-eight of the Bedouin crew were killed and more than 200 were rescued and taken prisoner by the Italians; the majority by the small hospital ship Meta. The Italian squadron was attacked by mistake at 2:20 p.m. by German Ju. 88 bombers, without suffering any damage. The Italian warships witnessed the sinking of the crippled vessels of the convoy shortly after, just before sailing back to Pantelleria. Later In the evening, the surviving ships ran into a minefield off Malta. The destroyers Badsworth and Matchless and the freighter Orari were damaged and the Polish destroyer ORP Kujawiak sank after midnight. Of the six merchantmen, Orari and Troilus reached Malta, the former having lost some cargo in the mine explosion; Hebe also struck a mine and suffered further damage, requiring a month in dry dock.

== Aftermath ==
=== Analysis ===
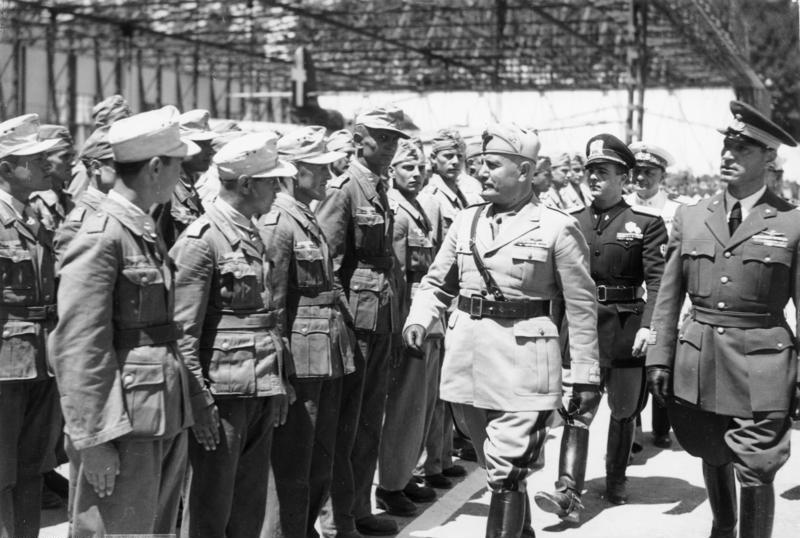
Mussolini visits a naval base and honours the participants in the Battle of Pantelleria, 25 June 1942. Il Duce is accompanied by Aldo Vidussoni, the party secretary, while reviewing a German contingent.

Captain Hardy reported,

During the final day of Harpoon three merchant ships in convoy were lost due to enemy air action. Of these, Chant received three direct hits, but Burdwan and Kentucky were, I believe, not touched but disabled by near misses. But for the enemy surface force, both of these ships might have been brought in.

— Hardy

In 1960, Ian Playfair, the British official historian, wrote that the relationship of the "battle for supplies" with the land war reached a climax in the second half of 1942. Far from the Eighth Army capturing airfields to the west in the Cyrenaican bulge, the army had been defeated at Gazala while Operation Julius was on and lost the landing grounds to the east. The disaster at Gazala had led to the military forces on Malta trying to save Egypt rather than vice versa. Vigorous had been a "disappointing operation" and turned back because the British and US air attacks on the Italian battle fleet had failed to inflict the damage hoped for. Force A could not hope to prevail in a surface action, a view echoed by Greene and Massignani in 2003. The two ships of Operation Harpoon that reached Malta delivered 15,000 long tons (15,241 t) of supplies which, with a decent harvest, might keep the population of Malta fed until September but the loss of the tanker Kentucky and the consumption of aviation fuel at Malta, led to fighters being given priority over the offensive force. Transit flights through Malta, except for Beauforts, were suspended; only close-range air attacks on easy targets were to be permitted and more fuel for the fighters was to be carried to Malta by submarine.

In 1962, the British naval official historian, Stephen Roskill, called the Axis success undeniable. Malta had not been supplied and the British had lost a cruiser, three destroyers and two merchantmen against the sinking of Trento and minor damage to Littorio. No attempt was made to run another convoy from Alexandria until the Eighth Army had conquered Libya. Roskill wrote that with hindsight, the course of events on land made naval operations in the central Mediterranean inherently dangerous. During the operation, the withdrawal of the Eighth Army forfeited one of the airfields being used for air cover. With Axis aircraft based along the length of the route to Malta, air power decided the course of events, although the diversion of Axis bombers against the convoys had been of some benefit to the British as they conducted the "scuttle" to El Alamein. In 1941, 30 of 31 merchant ships sailing for Malta had arrived but in the first seven months of 1942, of 30 sailings, ten were sunk, ten turned back damaged, three were sunk on arrival and seven delivered their supplies.

The Axis operation against Harpoon was the only undisputed squadron-sized victory for the Regia Marina in the Second World War. In their 1998 publication, Greene and Massignani wrote

Clearly this was an Axis victory and a tactical victory for the Italian Navy. Part of the convoy did get through to Malta, but the British suffered far heavier losses than did the Italians....

In 2001, Giorgio Giorgerini wrote that the Battle of Pantelleria was not a strategic success because two merchantmen reached Malta but was a satisfying tactical success; one of the few instances in which Italian warships fought aggressively enough against their opponents, even though somewhat exaggerated beyond its merits in later writing. In 2007, Malcolm Llewellyn-Jones, editor of the Royal Navy staff history, wrote that FAA fighters shot down 13 Axis aircraft and ships' gunners destroyed another sixteen, for a total of 29 Axis aircraft.

In 2003, Richard Woodman wrote that on 16 June, Harwood reported that,

We are outnumbered both in surface ships and Air Force and very gallant endeavour of all concerned cannot make up for...the deficiency.

In a later report, Harwood blamed the RAF for not providing enough aircraft capable of defeating the Italian battle fleet. The only success of Julius was the arrival of the two ships from Harpoon.

=== Casualties ===
The British suffered casualties of twenty-eight men killed on HMS Bedouin, fifteen on HMS Liverpool, thirteen on ORP Kujawiak, nine on HMS Badsworth, two on HMS Cairo, one on HMS Partridge, three on the auxiliary minesweeper Justified, twenty-three on Tanimbar, four on Chant, three on Burdwan. The ten most injured survivors of Bedouin were picked up by a CANT Z.506 Airone (Heron) seaplane after a Luftwaffe aircraft had spotted them and dropped a flare. On 16 June, Supermarina sent the Italian hospital ship Meta which spent two days rescuing survivors and was mistakenly attacked one evening at 7:00 p.m. by six Fiat CR.42 Falco fighters of the 54° Stormo, four armed with bombs; three survivors from Chant were also rescued, a total of 217 men.

== Allied order of battle ==
=== Allied merchant ships ===
Convoy GM 4
| Name | Year | Flag | GRT | Notes |
|---|---|---|---|---|
| SS Burdwan | 1928 | Merchant Navy | 6,069 | Aerial bomb near-miss, disabled, sunk by Italian warships, 3†, 122 surv. |
| MV Chant | 1938 | United States | 5,601 | Sunk by aircraft, 4† |
| MV Kentucky II | 1942 | Merchant Navy | 5,378 | Tanker, aerial bomb near-miss, abandoned, sunk by Italian warships, 0† |
| MV Orari | 1931 | Merchant Navy | 10,350 | Severely damaged, reached Malta |
| MV Tanimbar | 1930 | Netherlands | 8,619 | Sunk, torpedo-bombers, 23† 65 surv |
| SS Troilus | 1921 | Merchant Navy | 7,422 | Reached Malta |

=== Force W ===
Covering force
| Name | Flag | Type | Notes |
|---|---|---|---|
| HMS Argus | Royal Navy | Aircraft carrier | 2 Fulmars, 18 Swordfish |
| HMS Eagle | Royal Navy | Aircraft carrier | 16 Sea Hurricanes, 4 Fulmars |
| HMS Malaya | Royal Navy | Queen Elizabeth-class battleship | |
| HMS Charybdis | Royal Navy | Dido-class cruiser | |
| HMS Kenya | Royal Navy | Fiji-class cruiser | Flagship Vice-Admiral Alban Curteis |
| HMS Liverpool | Royal Navy | Town-class cruiser | severely damaged |
| HMS Antelope | Royal Navy | A-class destroyer | 13th Destroyer Flotilla |
| HMS Escapade | Royal Navy | E-class destroyer | 17th Destroyer Flotilla |
| HMS Icarus | Royal Navy | I-class destroyer | 17th Destroyer Flotilla |
| HMS Onslow | Royal Navy | O-class destroyer | 17th Destroyer Flotilla |
| HMS Vidette | Royal Navy | V-class destroyer | 13th Destroyer Flotilla |
| HMS Westcott | Royal Navy | W-class destroyer | 13th Destroyer Flotilla |
| HMS Wishart | Royal Navy | W-class destroyer | 13th Destroyer Flotilla |
| HMS Wrestler | Royal Navy | W-class destroyer | 13th Destroyer Flotilla |

=== Force X ===
Close escort
| Name | Flag | Type | Notes |
|---|---|---|---|
| HMS Cairo | Royal Navy | C-class cruiser | Flagship, Captain C. C. Hardy, damaged |
| HMS Welshman | Royal Navy | Abdiel-class minelayer | Special service |
| HMS Bedouin | Royal Navy | Tribal-class destroyer | 11th Destroyer Flotilla, sunk |
| HMS Ithuriel | Royal Navy | I-class destroyer | 11th Destroyer Flotilla |
| HMS Marne | Royal Navy | M-class destroyer | 11th Destroyer Flotilla |
| HMS Matchless | Royal Navy | M-class destroyer | 11th Destroyer Flotilla, severely damaged |
| HMS Partridge | Royal Navy | P-class destroyer | 11th Destroyer Flotilla, damaged |
| HMS Badsworth | Royal Navy | Hunt-class destroyer | 12th Destroyer Flotilla, severely damaged |
| HMS Blankney | Royal Navy | Hunt-class destroyer | 12th Destroyer Flotilla |
| ORP Kujawiak | Polish Navy | Hunt-class destroyer | 12th Destroyer Flotilla, sunk |
| HMS Middleton | Royal Navy | Hunt-class destroyer | 12th Destroyer Flotilla |
| HMS Hebe | Royal Navy | Halcyon-class minesweeper | 14th/17th Minesweeper Flotilla, severely damaged |
| HMS Speedy | Royal Navy | Halcyon-class minesweeper | 14th/17th Minesweeper Flotilla |
| HMS Hythe | Royal Navy | Bangor-class minesweeper | 14th/17th Minesweeper Flotilla |
| HMS Rye | Royal Navy | Bangor-class minesweeper | 14th/17th Minesweeper Flotilla |
| ML 121 | Royal Navy | Fairmile B motor launch | Minesweeper |
| ML 134 | Royal Navy | Fairmile B motor launch | Minesweeper |
| ML 135 | Royal Navy | Fairmile B motor launch | Minesweeper |
| ML 168 | Royal Navy | Fairmile B motor launch | Minesweeper |
| ML 459 | Royal Navy | Fairmile B motor launch | Minesweeper |
| ML 462 | Royal Navy | Fairmile B motor launch | Minesweeper |

=== Force Y ===
Fuelling force
| Name | Flag | Type | Notes |
|---|---|---|---|
| RFA Brown Ranger | Royal Navy | Ranger-class tanker | |
| HMS Coltsfoot | Royal Navy | Flower-class corvette | |
| HMS Geranium | Royal Navy | Flower-class corvette | |

=== Air power ===
FAA and RAF squadrons in Operation Julius.
| Name | Flag | Type | Notes |
Fleet Air Arm squadrons
| 815 Naval Air Squadron | Royal Navy | Swordfish | Air-to-surface-vessel radar (ASV) |
| 821 Naval Air Squadron | Royal Navy | Albacore | Bomber/torpedo-bomber |
| 825 Naval Air Squadron | Royal Navy | Albacore | Bomber/torpedo-bomber |
| 830 Naval Air Squadron | Royal Navy | Albacore | Bomber/torpedo-bomber |
RAF squadrons
| 69 Squadron | Royal Air Force | Baltimore | Reconnaissance bomber |
| 38 Squadron | Royal Air Force | Wellington | Torpedo-bomber |
| 39 Squadron | Royal Air Force | Beaufort | Torpedo-bomber |
| 217 Squadron | Royal Air Force | Beaufort | Torpedo-bomber |
| 13th Light Bomber Squadron | Hellenic Air Force | Blenheim | Bomber |
| 47 Squadron | Royal Air Force | Wellesley | Bomber |
| 203 Squadron | Royal Air Force | Blenheim | Bomber |
| 203 Squadron | Royal Air Force | Maryland | Bomber |
| 459 Squadron RAAF | Royal Air Force | Hudson | Maritime reconnaissance |
| 2 PRU | Royal Air Force | Spitfire | Photographic reconnaissance |
| 230 Squadron | Royal Air Force | Sunderland | Maritime patrol (flying boat) |
| 221 Squadron (det.) | Royal Air Force | Wellington | Air-to-surface-vessel radar (ASV) |

== Italian order of battle ==
=== 7th Cruiser Division ===
7th Cruiser Division
| Name | Flag | Type | Notes |
|---|---|---|---|
| Eugenio di Savoia | Kingdom of Italy | Condottieri-class cruiser | Flagship, Rear-Admiral Alberto da Zara |
| Raimondo Montecuccoli | Kingdom of Italy | Condottieri-class cruiser | 7th Cruiser Division |
| Premuda | Kingdom of Italy | Ex-Yugoslav Dubrovnik | 10th Destroyer Squadron |
| Lanzerotto Malocello | Kingdom of Italy | Navigatori-class destroyer | 14th Destroyer Squadron |
| Ugolino Vivaldi | Kingdom of Italy | Navigatori-class destroyer | 14th Destroyer Squadron |
| Alfredo Oriani | Kingdom of Italy | Oriani-class destroyer | 10th Destroyer Squadron |
| Ascari | Kingdom of Italy | Soldati-class destroyer | 10th Destroyer Squadron |

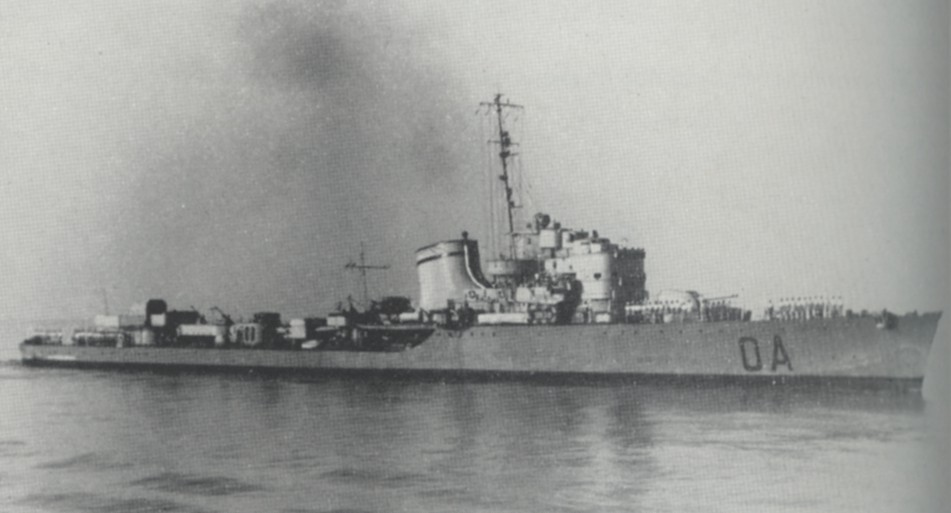
Italian Poeti-class destroyer Alfredo Oriani

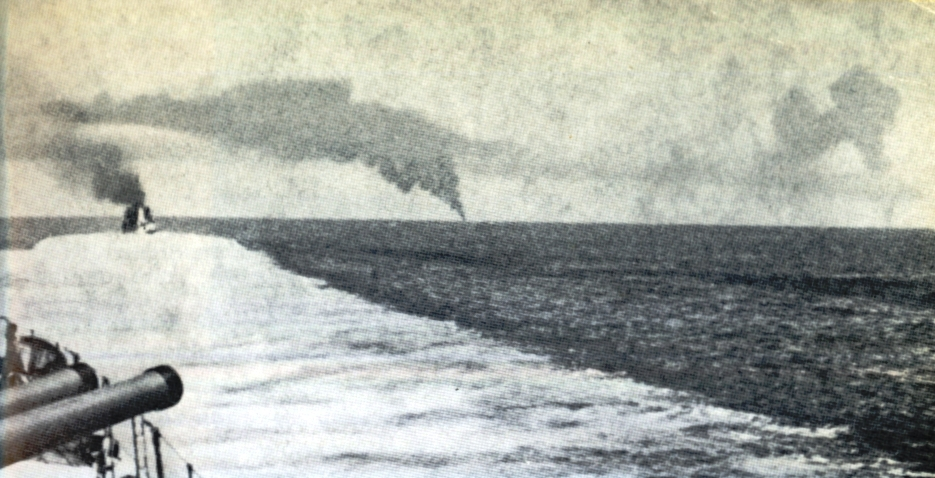
Italian destroyers with their guns trained on the damaged stragglers Kentucky and Burdwan

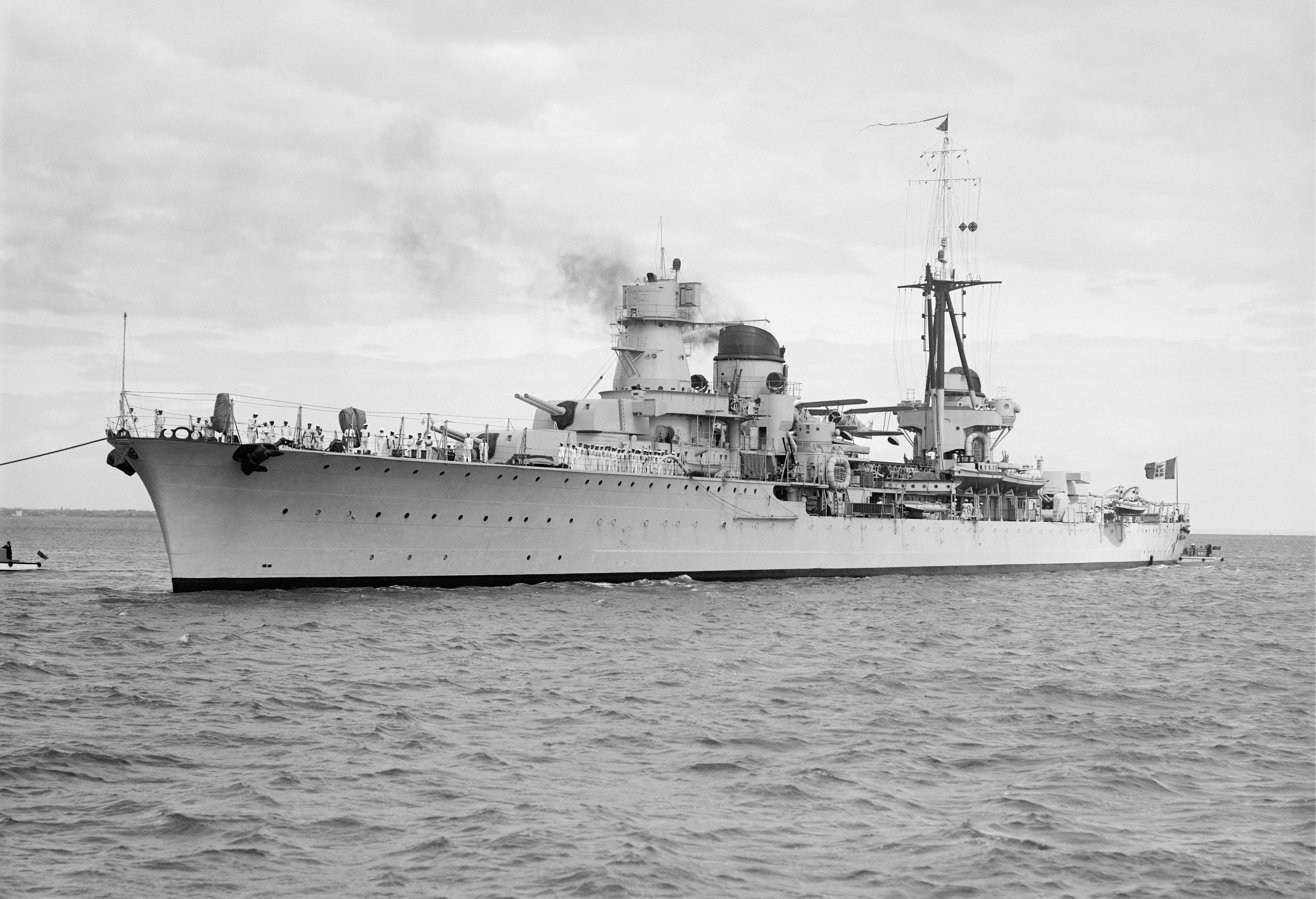
Italian Condottieri-class cruiser Raimondo Montecuccoli

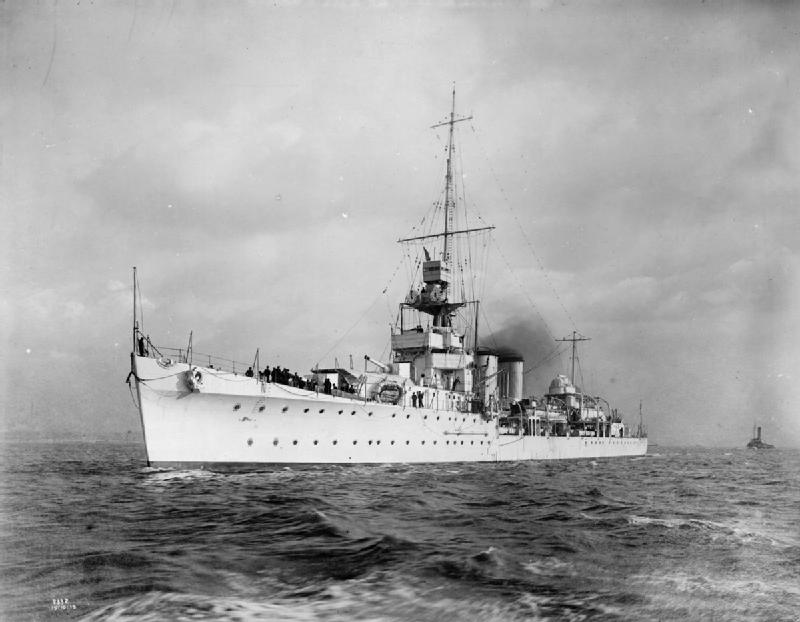
HMS Cairo before conversion to anti-aircraft cruiser

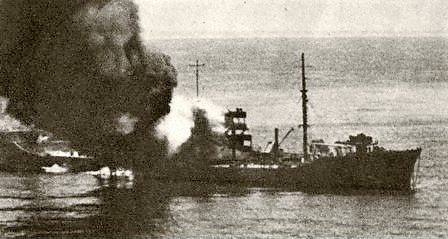
SS Kentucky on fire, after hits from Raimondo Montecuccoli; it was later torpedoed and sunk by the destroyer Oriani

The destroyer Bedouin, crippled by gunfire from the 7th Cruiser Division; sinking some hours later after being hit by an aerial torpedo.

== See also ==
- Battle of the Mediterranean
- Bonner Fellers
- Malta Convoys
- Operation Pedestal
- Operation Vigorous
- Operation White

== Bibliography ==
- Bragadin, Marc'Antonio (1957). The Italian Navy in World War II. Annapolis, MD: United States Naval Institute. OCLC 1150441.
- Cernuschi, Enrico; Brescia, Maurizio (2010). Le navi ospedale italiane 1935–1945 [Italian Hospital Ships 1935–1945] (in Spanish). Parma: Albertelli Edizioni Speciali. ISBN 978-88-87372-86-1.
- Cocchia, Aldo (1980) [1958]. The Hunters and the Hunted: Adventures of Italian Naval Forces. Navies and Men. trans M. Gwyer. New York: Arno Press. ISBN 978-0-405-13035-9.
- Cunningham, Admiral Sir Andrew B. (1948). Despatches on Mediterranean Convoy Operations January 1941 – August 1942. London: HMSO. OCLC 181729384.
- Da Zara, Admiral Alberto (1949). Pelle d'ammiraglio (in Italian). Rome: Ufficio Storico della Marina Militare. OCLC 875268896.
- Giorgerini, Giorgio (2001). La guerra italiana sul mare. La marina tra vittoria e sconfitta 1940–1943 [The Italian War at Sea. The Navy Between Victory and Defeat 1940–1943]. Le scie (in Italian) (2nd ed.). Milano: Mondadori. ISBN 978-88-04-50150-3.
- Greene, Jack; Massignani, Alessandro (1998). The Naval War in the Mediterranean, 1940–1943. London: Chatham. ISBN 978-1-885119-61-2.
- Greene, J.; Massignani, A. (2002) [1998]. The Naval War in the Mediterranean 1940–1943 (pbk. ed.). Rochester: Chatham. ISBN 978-1-86176-190-3.
- Grehan, John; Mace, Martin (2013). The War at Sea in the Mediterranean 1940–1944. Barnsley: Pen and Sword. ISBN 978-1-4738-3736-2.
- Hinsley, F. H. (1994) [1993]. British Intelligence in the Second World War. Its influence on Strategy and Operations. History of the Second World War. abridged (2nd rev. ed.). London: HMSO. ISBN 978-0-11-630961-7.
- Ireland, Bernard (2004). The War in the Mediterranean 1940–1943. Barnsley: Leo Cooper. ISBN 978-1-84415-047-2.
- Jordan, Roger W. (2006) [1999]. The World's Merchant Fleets 1939: The Particulars and Wartime Fates of 6,000 Ships (2nd ed.). London: Chatham/Lionel Leventhal. ISBN 978-1-86176-293-1.
- Llewellyn-Jones, M., ed. (2007). The Royal Navy and the Mediterranean Convoys: A Naval Staff History. Naval Staff Histories. London: Routledge. ISBN 978-0-415-39095-8.
- Mattesini, Francesco (2017). "La Battaglia Aeronavale di Mezzo Giugno" [The Air–Sea Battle of mid-June]. Academia (in Italian). Archived from the original on 17 April 2023.
- O'Hara, Vincent P. (2013). In Passage Perilous: Malta and the Convoy Battles of June 1942. Bloomington, Indiana: Indiana University Press. ISBN 978-0-253-00603-5.
- Playfair, I. S. O.; et al. (2004) [1st. pub. HMSO:1960]. Butler, Sir James (ed.). The Mediterranean and Middle East: British Fortunes Reach Their Lowest Ebb (September 1941 to September 1942). History of the Second World War, United Kingdom Military Series. Vol. III. Uckfield: Naval & Military Press. ISBN 978-1-84574-067-2.
- Richards, D.; Saunders, H. St G. (1975) [1954]. Royal Air Force 1939–45: The Fight Avails. Vol. II (repr. ed.). London: HMSO. ISBN 978-0-11-771593-6. Archived from the original on 1 January 2019.
- Roberti, Vero (1976). Sotto il segno di Antares: la 7. Divisione incrociatori [Under the sign of Antares: the 7th Cruiser Division]. Biblioteca del mare, Guerra sui mari; *133**19. Milano: Mursia. OCLC 797313863.
- Roskill, S. W. (1962) [1956]. The Period of Balance. History of the Second World War: The War at Sea 1939–1945. Vol. II. London: HMSO. OCLC 174453986. Archived from the original on 6 March 2014.
- Thomas, David A. (1999). Malta Convoys: 1940–1943, The Struggle at Sea. Barnsley: Leo Cooper. ISBN 978-0-85052-663-9.
- Woodman, Richard (2000). Malta Convoys, 1940–1943. London: Jack Murray. ISBN 978-0-7195-5753-8.
- Woodman, R. (2003). Malta Convoys 1940–1943 (pbk. ed.). London: John Murray. ISBN 978-0-7195-6408-6.
