= John Andrew Pearson =

John Andrew Pearson may refer to:

- John A. Pearson, Canadian architect
- John Andrew Pearson (Royal Navy officer)
