= Alberto da Zara =

Italian admiral

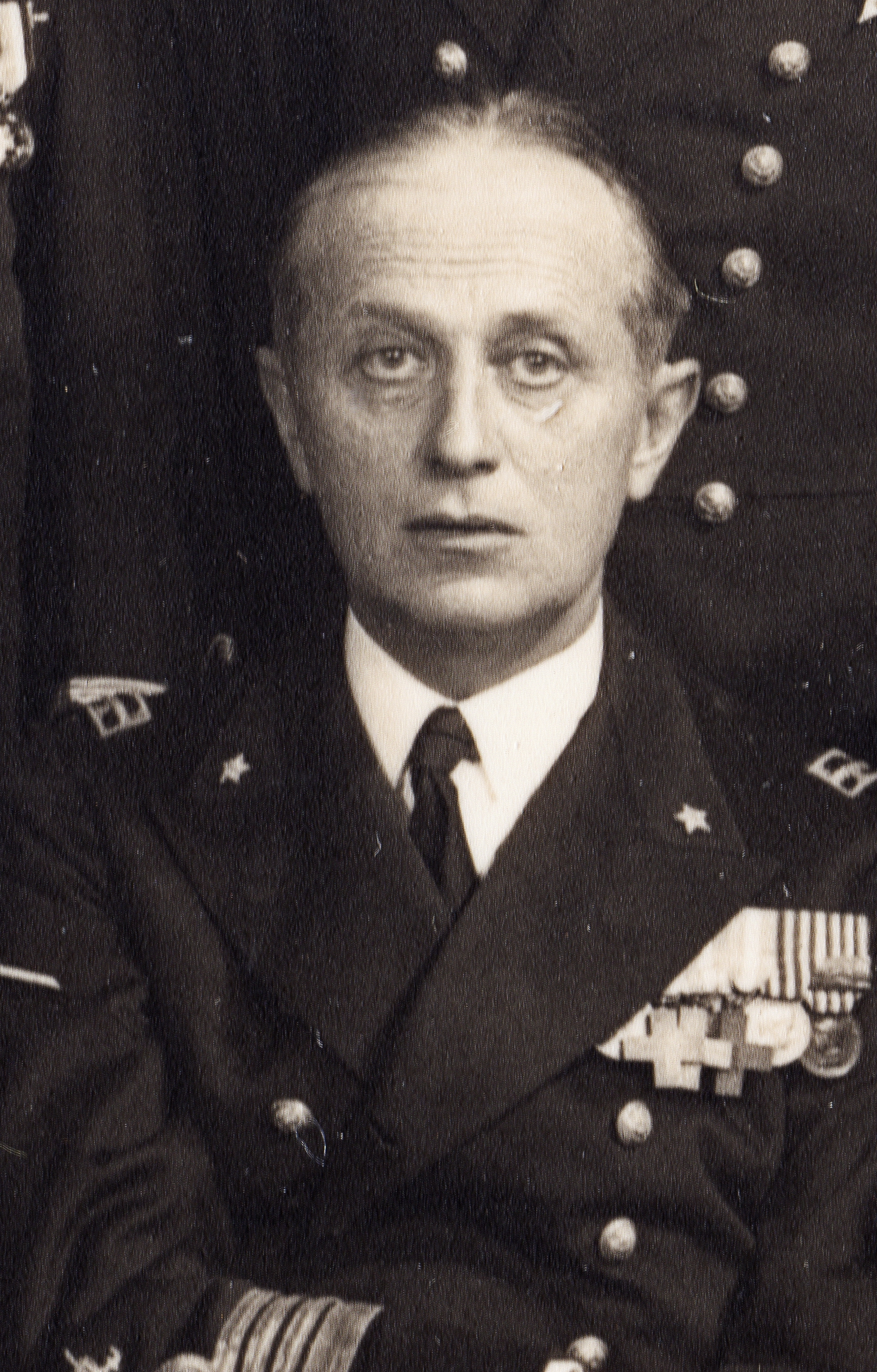
- Born: 8 April 1889; Padua, Kingdom of Italy
- Died: 4 June 1951 (aged 62); Foggia, Italy
- Military career
- Allegiance: Kingdom of Italy
- Branch: Regia Marina
- Service years: 1907–1946
- Rank: Ammiraglio di squadra (Squadron Admiral)
- Conflicts: Italo-Turkish War; World War I; World War II; Battle of the Mediterranean; Battle of Calabria; Operation Harpoon; Operation Pedestal

Alberto da Zara (8 April 1889 – 4 June 1951) was an Italian admiral of the Regia Marina.

== Biography ==
Born at Padua, he joined the navy in 1907 and participated in the Italo-Turkish War and the First World War; during the latter, he commanded the small force that occupied the island of Pelagosa in the Adriatic Sea, and although the occupation ceased after a month due to several difficulties, he was promoted to Lieutenant.

In the inter-war years, he first commanded a gunboat in the Dodecanese, and then the river gunboat Ermanno Carlotto on the Yangtze in the Far East, from 1922 to 1925. In 1933, promoted to captain, he was slated to be the first commander of the modern cruiser Emanuele Filiberto Duca d'Aosta, commissioned two years later; from April 1937 he transferred on the cruiser Raimondo Montecuccoli, which was assigned to the Far East til November 1938. On 2 January 1939 he was promoted to rear admiral, and from April he became commander of the maritime command in newly occupied Albania.

On Italy's declaration of war (10 June 1940), Da Zara was assigned to command two cruisers of the 4th Division (the di Giussano and the da Barbiano), and in such capacity, he fought, albeit in a very minor role, in the Battle of Punta Stilo (also called the "Battle of Calabria"). Afterwards, he was assigned to some minor commands, such as commander of the La Spezia Naval Base. On 5 March 1942, he took command of the 7th Naval Division (replacing Raffaele de Courten), made of the four light cruisers of the Montecuccoli and D'Aosta classes; on 15 June 1942, his command fought the Battle of Pantelleria ("Operation Harpoon"), often considered one of the few squadron-sized Italian successes on the sea during the war. His division sailed again to contest Operation Pedestal, but its sortie was aborted and had to return to port.

On 1 August 1943 Da Zara took command of the 5th Division, made up of the two old battleships Duilio and Andrea Doria, stationed at Taranto. When the Italian armistice with the Allies was proclaimed, he complied with the orders to sail to Malta and, on arrival, because of the death of Admiral Carlo Bergamini, took command of the whole Italian fleet. Da Zara remained in Malta until December 1943, when he returned to Italy. After commanding the military department of the Ionian Sea and inspector of the naval forces, he retired from active duty in October 1946.

Da Zara was among the founders of "Armata Italiana della Libertà" (Italian Army of Liberty), an anti-Communist paramilitary.

After publishing a volume of memoirs (Pelle d'ammiraglio, "Admiral's skin") in 1949, Da Zara died at Foggia in 1951.

== Family ==
Alberto's father was a former cavalry officer and his brother Guido died fighting in Croatia as a cavalry officer on 16 February 1943 while commanding the Cavalleggeri di Alessandria regiment. Da Zara never married, but he was a notorious ladies' man by his conduct in high society in Italy and the Far East - during his time in China, his conquests seem to have included Wallis Simpson, future wife of King Edward VIII.

== Ranks ==
Guardiamarina (1911), Sottotenente di Vascello (1913), Tenente di Vascello (1915), Capitano di Corvetta (1923), Capitano di Fregata (1927), Capitano di Vascello (1933), Contrammiraglio (1939), Ammiraglio di Divisione (1941), Ammiraglio di Squadra (1944).

== Honours ==
- Military Order of Italy - Commander
- War Merit Cross
- Commemorative Medal for the Italo-Turkish War 1911-1912
- Commemorative Medal for the Italo-Austrian War 1915-1918 (4 campaign-year stars)
- Commemorative Medal of the Unity of Italy
- Allied Victory Medal
- Order of Aviz - awarded by Portugal

== Sources ==
- Franco Bargoni, "L'intervento navale italiano nella guerra civile spagnola", Rivista Italiana Difesa, 1985, 3, pp. 78–86;
- Marc'Antonio Bragadin, Il dramma della Marina italiana 1940-45. Milan, Mondadori, 1968;
- Dino Buzzati, "Il testamento dell'Ammiraglio", Milan, Corriere della Sera, 6 June 1951, 3;
- Enrico Cernuschi, "La squadra dimenticata", Storia Militare, 2001, 91, pp. 18–31;
- Giuliano Da Frè. "Il marinaio combattente". Rivista Marittima, n. 2 - febbraio 2002, pp. 101–114
- Alberto Da Zara, Pelle d'Ammiraglio, Verona, Mondadori, 1949;
- Ernesto Di Marino, "Incrociatori italiani 1920-1943 (III)", Aviazione e Marina, 1970, 67, pp. 22–24;
- Franco Gay, Incrociatori classe Di Giussano. Part II, Rome, Edizioni Bizzarri, 1979;
- Giorgio Giorgerini, La guerra italiana sul mare. La Marina tra vittoria e sconfitta, 1940-1943, Milan, Mondadori, 2001;
- Marco Mattioli, "La carica di Poloj", Storia Militare, 2006, 157, pp. 18–25;
- Guido Minchilli, "Alberto Da Zara", Rivista Marittima, 1976, 3, pp. 45–51;
- Nicola Morabito, La Marina Italiana in guerra. 1915–1918, Milan, Marangoni Editore, 1933;
- Riccardo Nassigh, "La crisi italo-etiopica e la mobilitazione navale britannica (1935–1936)", Rivista Italiana Difesa, 1985, 1, pp. 80–87;
- Gianni Rocca, Fucilate gli ammiragli. La tragedia della marina italiana nella seconda guerra mondiale, Milan, Mondadori, 1987.
