= 14th/17th Minesweeper Flotilla =

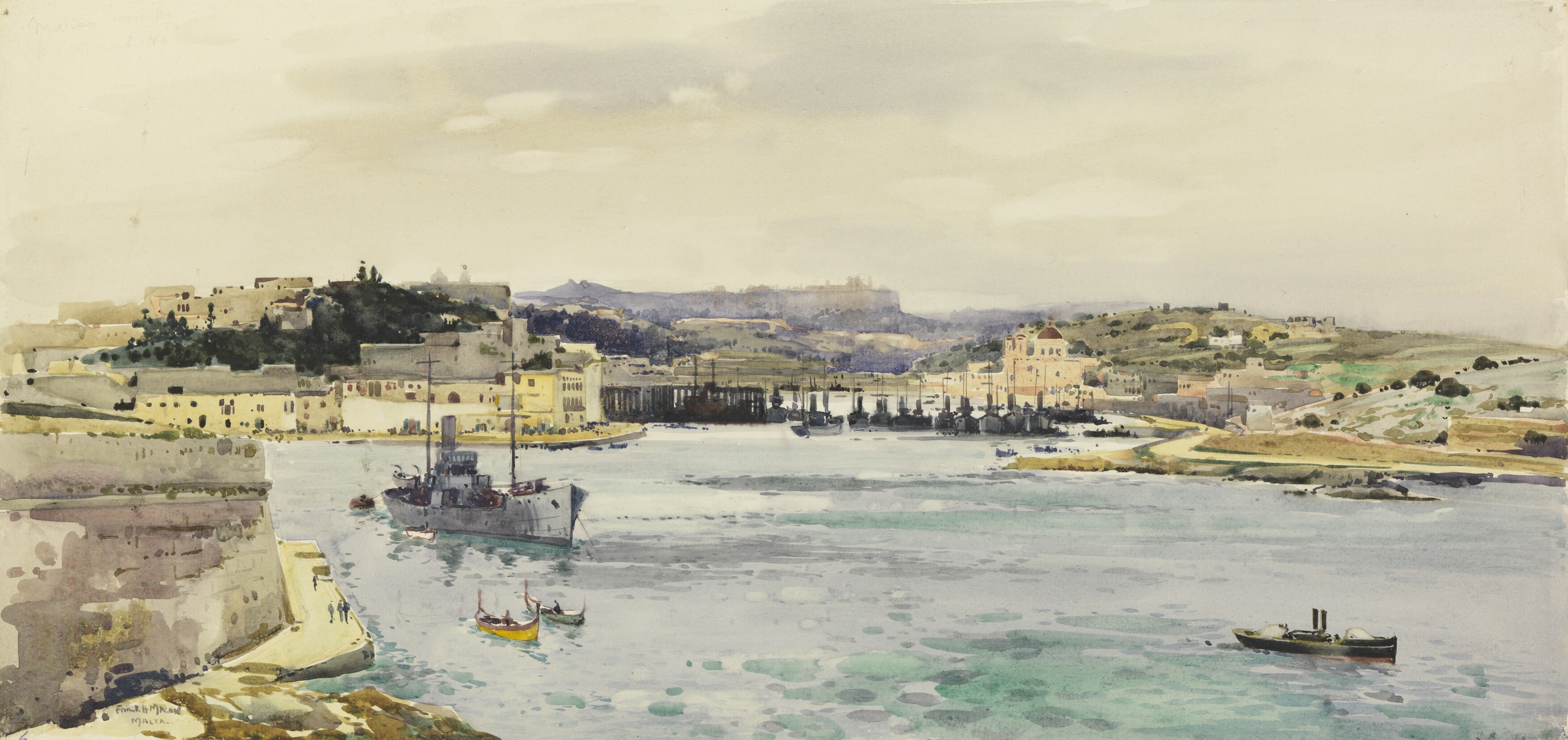
- Marsamxett Harbour – the base for Malta-based minesweepers
- Active: 1942–1944
- Country: United Kingdom
- Branch: Royal Navy
- Role: Minesweeper
- Size: Flotilla
- Garrison/HQ: Marsamxett Harbour, Malta
- Engagements: Battle of the Mediterranean

Commanders
- Notable commanders: Commander J J Jerome RN

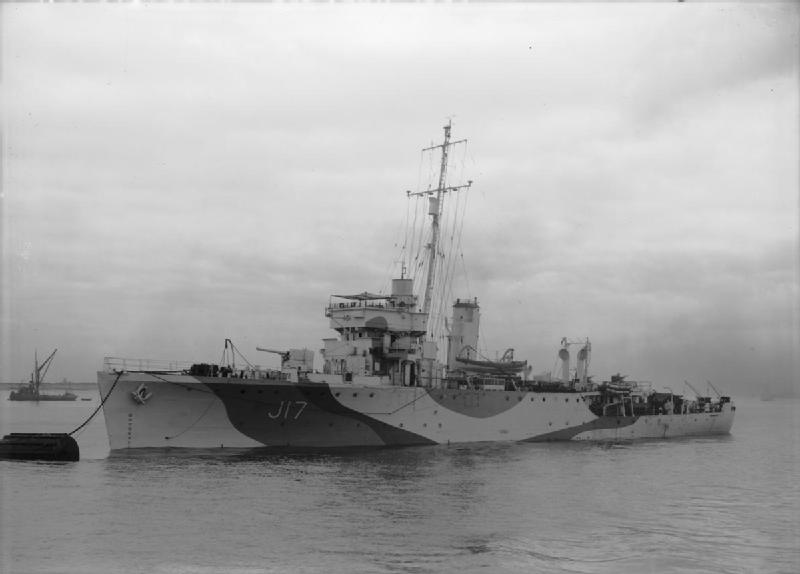
HMS Speedy in 1944

The 14th/17th Minesweeper Flotilla was a Royal Navy minesweeper flotilla based in Malta during the Second World War.

== History ==
The flotilla comprised four fleet minesweepers from the Devonport based 14th M/S Flotilla – two Halcyon class (HMS Speedy and HMS Hebe) and two Bangor class (HMS Rye and HMS Hythe).

The four vessels were detached from 14th M/S Flotilla in 1942 and designated 17th M/S Flotilla on arrival in Gibraltar. The flotilla commander was Cdr Doran RN in HMS Speedy.

The flotilla proceeded to Malta in June 1942 as part of the Malta Convoy Operation Harpoon. The four sweepers cleared the approaches to Grand Harbour and led the Harpoon convoy into Malta. During its service in Malta the flotilla was known as 14th/17th Minesweeper Flotilla. The flotilla participated in the famous Malta Convoy Operation Pedestal during August 1942, which included the rescue of the oil tanker SS Ohio, for which Lt J. A. Pearson of HMS Rye was awarded the Distinguished Service Cross.

14th/17th Minesweeper Flotilla, Malta, August 1942

- HMS Speedy – Lt Cdr J. C. Brooks RN
- HMS Hebe – Lt Cdr G. Mowatt RN
- HMS Rye – A/Lt Cdr J. A. Pearson RNR
- HMS Hythe – Lt Cdr L. B. Miller RN sunk by U-boat in October 1943
- Commander Minesweepers Malta, Cdr J. J. Jerome RN, also in HMS Speedy

== Sources ==
- Warships of World War II, by H. T. Lenton & J. J. Colledge, pub. Ian Allan Ltd.
- Malta Convoy, by P. Shankland & A. Hunter, pub. Collins (1961).
