= Alban Curteis =

Royal Navy Admiral (1887-1961)

Admiral Sir Alban Curteis KCB CVO DSO
- Born: 13 January 1887
- Died: 27 November 1961 (aged 74)
- Military career
- Allegiance: United Kingdom
- Branch: Royal Navy
- Service years: 1902 – 1944
- Rank: Admiral
- Commands: HMS Verity; HMS Despatch; HMS Nelson; 2nd Cruiser Squadron; 2nd Battle Squadron; Senior British Naval Officer, Western Atlantic
- Conflicts: World War I World War II
- Awards: Knight Commander of the Order of the Bath; Commander of the Royal Victorian Order; Companion of the Distinguished Service Order

Admiral Sir Alban Thomas Buckley Curteis KCB CVO DSO (13 January 1887 – 27 November 1961) was a Royal Navy officer who went on to be Senior British Naval Officer, Western Atlantic.

== Education ==
Curteis was educated at New Beacon School in Sevenoaks, followed by HMS Britannia, Dartmouth.

== Naval career ==
Curteis joined the Royal Navy in 1902 and served in the First World War. He was appointed Commanding Officer of HMS Verity in 1922 and Flag Captain commanding HMS Despatch and Chief of Staff to the Commander-in-Chief of the America and West Indies Station in 1928. Curteis was appointed Flag Captain commanding HMS Nelson and Captain of the Fleet to the Commander-in-Chief of the Home Fleet in 1931 before becoming Captain of the Royal Naval College, Dartmouth in 1933. He became Captain of the Fleet for the Home Fleet in 1935 and went on to be Commander of the Royal Naval Barracks at Devonport in 1938.

He served in the Second World War as Commander of the 2nd Cruiser Squadron from 1940 and then as Commander of the 2nd Battle Squadron and Second-in-Command of the Home Fleet from 1941. In June 1942 he led Operation Harpoon, a supply convoy to Malta which was running out of food and medical supplies; the plan was to despatch a naval convoy from Alexandria but in the event the convoy came under Italian naval attack and suffered many losses. Curteis was made Senior British Naval Officer, Western Atlantic in 1942 and retired in 1944.

== Family ==
In 1915 he married Helen Morrall; they had one son and one daughter. In 1941 he married Freda Morrall.

Military offices
Preceded by Sir Charles Kennedy-Purvis	Commander-in-Chief, America and West Indies Station; 1942–1944	Succeeded by Sir Irvine Glennie
