= ORP Kujawiak (L72) =

1940 Hunt-class destroyer

Coordinates: 35°53′N 14°35′E

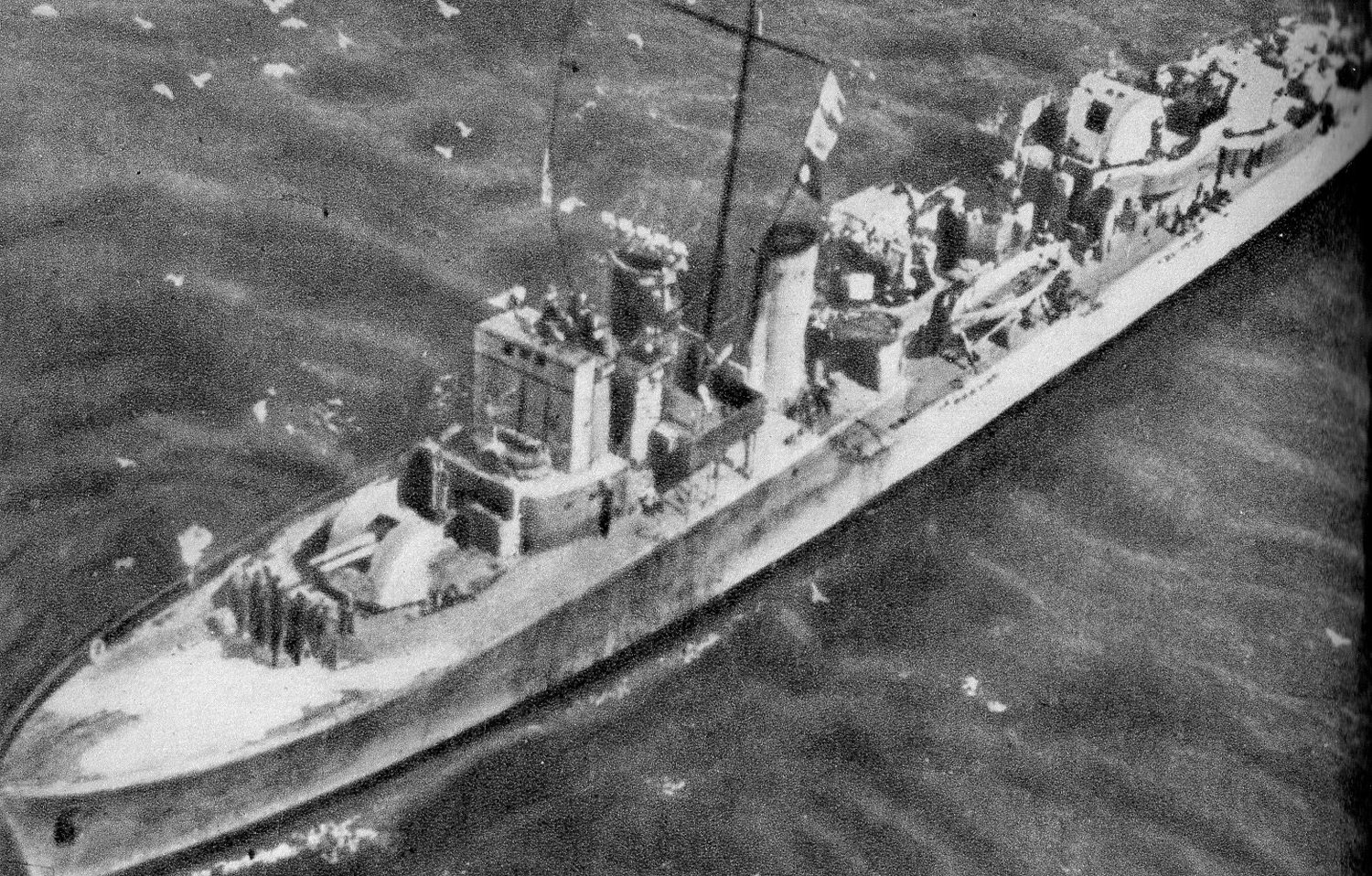
- Kujawiak in 1942

History

United Kingdom
- Name: Oakley
- Builder: Vickers-Armstrongs, Tyne
- Laid down: 22 November 1939
- Launched: 30 October 1940
- Fate: Transferred to Poland, 3 April 1941

Poland
- Name: ORP Kujawiak
- Commissioned: 17 June 1941
- Fate: Sunk by mine, 16 June 1942

General characteristics
- Class & type: Type II Hunt-class destroyer
- Displacement: 1,050 long tons (1,070 t) (standard)
- Length: 280 ft (85.3 m)
- Beam: 31 ft 6 in (9.6 m)
- Draught: 17 ft 2 in (5.2 m)
- Installed power: 2 Admiralty three-drum boilers; 19,000 shp (14,000 kW)
- Propulsion: 2 shafts; geared steam turbines
- Speed: 27 knots (50 km/h; 31 mph)
- Range: 3,700 nmi (6,900 km; 4,300 mi) at 14 knots (26 km/h; 16 mph)
- Complement: 160
- Armament: 3 × twin 4 in (102 mm) DP guns; 1 × quadruple 2 pdr (40 mm (1.6 in)) AA guns; 2 to 4 20 mm (0.8 in) Oerlikon AA guns; 2 depth charge throwers; 3 depth charge rails, 110 depth charges

ORP Kujawiak was a British Type II Hunt-class destroyer escort, originally ordered as HMS Oakley.

Kujawiak was built by Vickers-Armstrongs at the company's High Walker yard on the River Tyne. Her keel was laid down on 22 November 1939 and she was launched on 30 October 1940 as HMS Oakley but on completion in June 1941 she was renamed and commissioned into the Polish Navy.

Kujawiak was sunk on 16 June 1942 after running into a German MT 14 minefield near Malta while participating in Operation Harpoon. 13 Polish sailors died and 20 were wounded.

== Design ==
The ship was ordered under the 1939 War Emergency Programme as HMS Oakley on 4 September 1939 from Vickers-Armstrongs High Walker Yard on the Tyne who laid her down on 22 November 1939 with the yard number of J4145. Her engines were to be constructed by Parsons. She was launched on 30 October 1940 under her British name but on 3 April 1941 it was decided to transfer her together with HMS Silverton to the Polish Navy. On her completion on 17 June 1941 she was commissioned as ORP Kujawiak.

== War service ==
=== 1941 ===
On 18 June Kujawiak came under attack by German aircraft whilst on passage from Tyne to Scapa Flow to work-up for operational service with ships of Home Fleet. Fire from the aircraft hit the 4-inch ready-use ammunition which exploded causing one fatal casualty. After completing her work-up on 25 July she joined the 15th Destroyer Flotilla based at Plymouth for local convoy escort and patrol duties.

Later that year on 23 October Kujawiak deployed with fellow Polish destroyer ORP Krakowiak for escort of inward Convoy SL89 during final stage of passage in Irish Sea from Freetown into Liverpool. On 22 December she sailed from Scapa Flow as part of Force J to carry out landings on the Lofoten Islands as part of Operation Claymore. Two days later on 27 December the destroyer sustained slight damage from a near miss during air attacks.

=== 1942 ===
In early June 1942 Kujawiak was nominated for loan service with the Home Fleet as part of the escort for the planned relief convoy to Malta (Operation Harpoon). On 6 June she joined military Convoy WS19S in the Northwest Approaches as part of Ocean Escort for passage to Gibraltar. She joined Force X at Gibraltar on 12 June whose task was to escort the Harpoon convoy through the Sicilian Narrows to Malta. On 14 June the convoy came under heavy and sustained air attacks during which the cruiser Liverpool was damaged. The following day the air attacks continued and Kujawiak was in action with Italian warships attempting to intercept and attack the convoy.

Near midnight on 16 June, while entering Grand Harbor, Malta Kujawiak sustained major structural damage forward after detonating a mine while going to the aid of Badsworth after she had struck a mine. Kujawiak sank before a successful tow could be achieved. 13 crew lost their lives.

=== Discovery of wreck ===
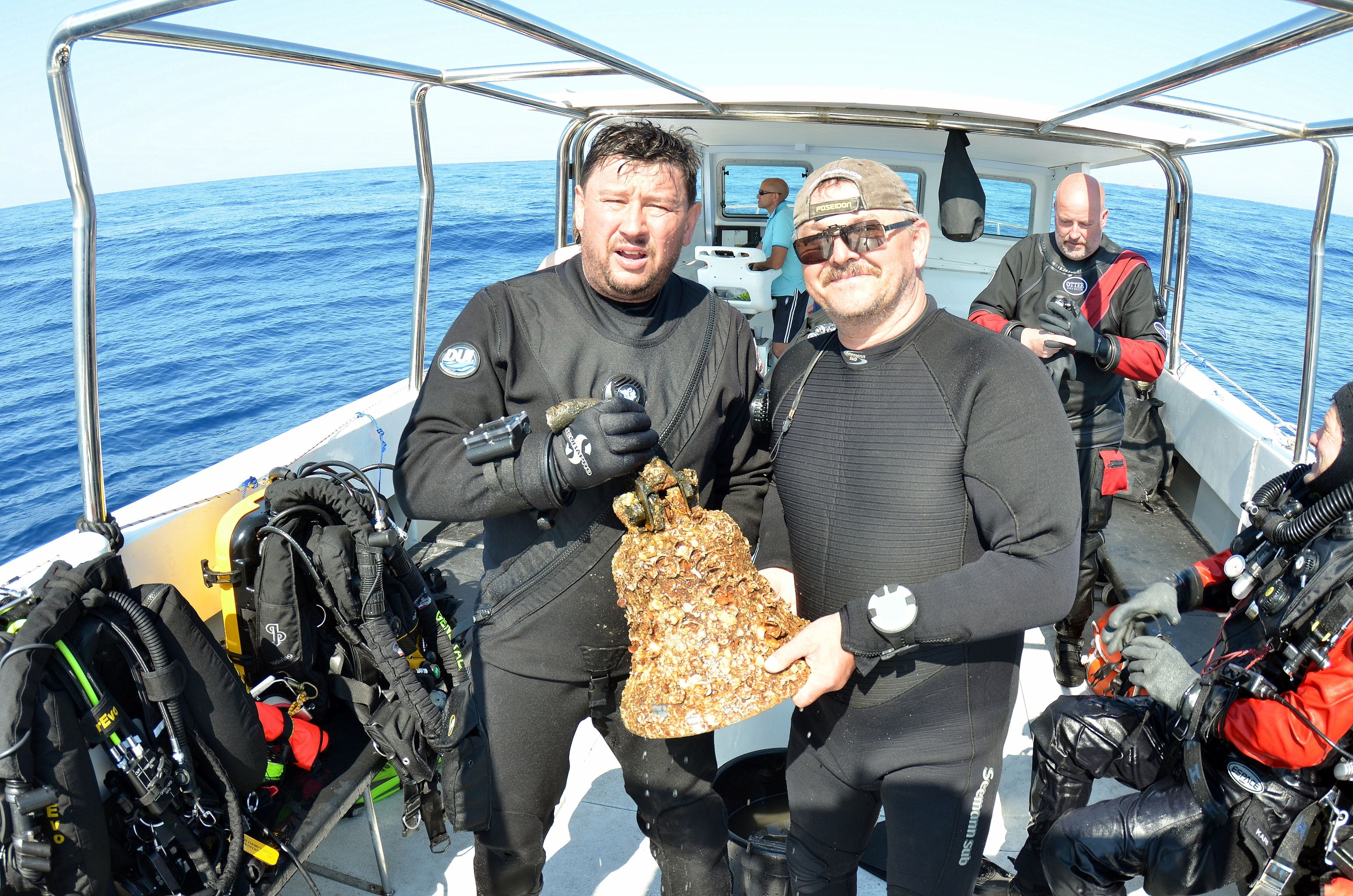
Kujawiaks bell retrieved

On 22 September 2014, a Polish diving expedition located the wreck of Kujawiak at a depth of ~97 metres. She rests on her port side, about 6 km (3.7 mi) off Malta’s south-east coast, is relatively well-preserved with the bow, bridge and forward gun mount largely intact. The stern section is heavily damaged, with deformed plating consistent with impact against the seabed, both rudder and propellers remain in place. Scattered around the wreck are depth charges and shell casings.

The site was revisited in 2015 and 2017, the latter expedition successfully recovering the ship’s bell, which was transferred to the Malta Maritime Museum for conservation and display. The Maltese government, through Heritage Malta’s Underwater Cultural Heritage Unit, has designated the wreck as both a war grave and an underwater archaeological site. The site is protected by a 500-metre exclusion zone, with unauthorised diving strictly prohibited under national heritage regulations.

== Bibliography ==
- Borowiak, Mariusz (2018). Hunt-class Destroyers in Polish Navy Service. Kagero Publishing. ISBN 978-83-66148-10-9.
- Colledge, J. J.; Warlow, Ben & Bush, Steve (2020). Ships of the Royal Navy: The Complete Record of all Fighting Ships of the Royal Navy from the 15th Century to the Present (5th revised and updated ed.). Seaforth Publishing. ISBN 978-1-5267-9327-0.
- English, John (1987). The Hunts: A History of the Design, Development and Careers of the 86 Destroyers of This Class Built for the Royal and Allied Navies during World War II. World Ship Society. ISBN 0-905617-44-4.
- Friedman, Norman (2008). British Destroyers & Frigates: The Second World War and After. Seaforth Publishing. ISBN 978-1-84832-015-4.
- Lenton, H. T. (1998). British & Empire Warships of the Second World War. Naval Institute Press. ISBN 1-55750-048-7.
- Whitley, M. J. (2000). Destroyers of World War Two: An International Encyclopedia. Cassell & Co. ISBN 1-85409-521-8.
