= ORP Krakowiak (L115) =

Polish destroyer

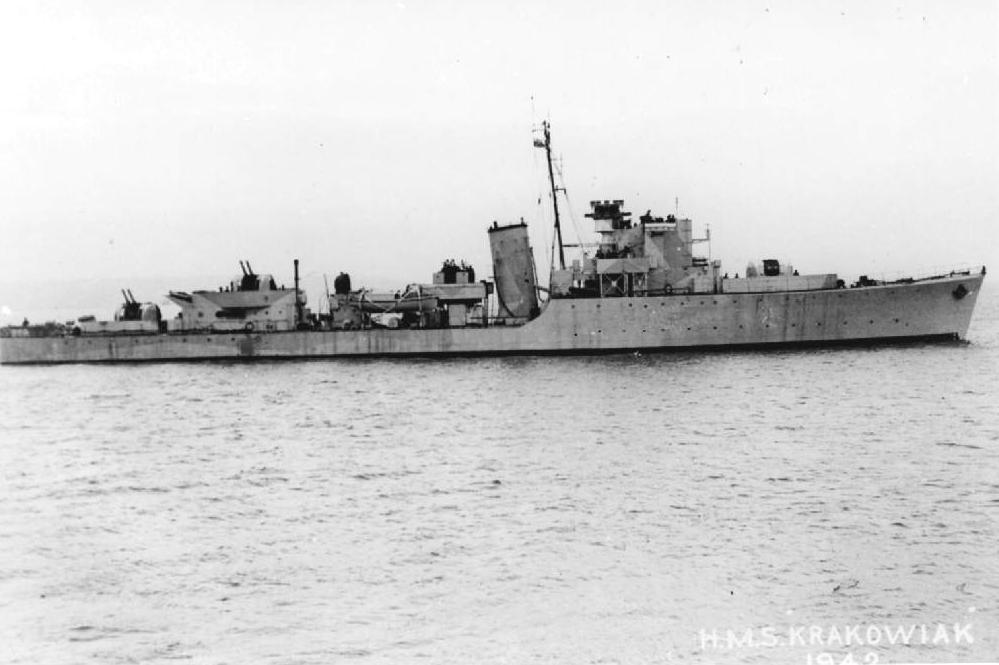
- ORP Krakowiak (L115) in 1942

History

Poland
- Name: ORP Krakowiak
- Builder: J.S. White, Cowes
- Laid down: 5 December 1939
- Launched: 4 December 1940
- Commissioned: 28 May 1941
- Decommissioned: 1946
- Fate: Scrapped, 1959

General characteristics
- Class & type: Type II Hunt-class destroyer
- Displacement: 1,050 long tons (1,070 t) (standard)
- Length: 85.0 m (278 ft 10 in)
- Beam: 9.5 m (31 ft 2 in)
- Draft: 2.4 m (7 ft 10 in)
- Speed: 27 knots (50 km/h; 31 mph)
- Armament: 3 × twin 102 mm (4.0 in) universal Mk XVI guns; 1 × quadruple 2 pdr (40 mm (1.6 in)) AA guns; 4 × 20 mm (0.8 in) Oerlikon AA guns; 2 × Lewis machine guns; 2 × depth charge launchers; 2 × Thornycroft depth charge mortars; 110 depth charges

ORP Krakowiak was a British Type II Hunt-class destroyer escort, used by the Polish Navy during World War II. Initially built for the Royal Navy, it bore the name of HMS Silverton during British use.

== History ==
The ship was laid down on 5 December 1939 in the J. Samuel White Shipyard in Cowes. On 4 December 1940 she was launched as HMS Silverton for the Royal Navy. However, on 3 April 1941 it was agreed that she would be allocated (along with HMS Oakley) to the Polish Navy to replace the ex-French destroyer Ouragan which was being manned by the Poles. Commissioned on 28 May of that year, she was renamed ORP Krakowiak, after either a folk dance from Kraków or an inhabitant of that city.

As she was the first ship of her class to be handed to the Poles, until 10 July 1941, her crew spent most of their time training and getting to know the ship. After that date she entered line service in the convoy escort role in the North Atlantic. In December of that year she was among the ships to take part in the successful raid against a German naval outpost on the Lofoten islands. Throughout the war she also patrolled the North Sea, often engaging in skirmishes with German torpedo boats. In 1943 she moved to the Mediterranean, where she took part in, among others, Operation Husky, the Allied invasion of Sicily, and later in the Dodecanese Campaign. Altogether, during the Second World War she covered over 146,000 nautical miles (270,000 km) escorting 206 different convoys, including nine in the North Atlantic. She shot down three enemy planes, but the number of enemy vessels sunk is unclear.

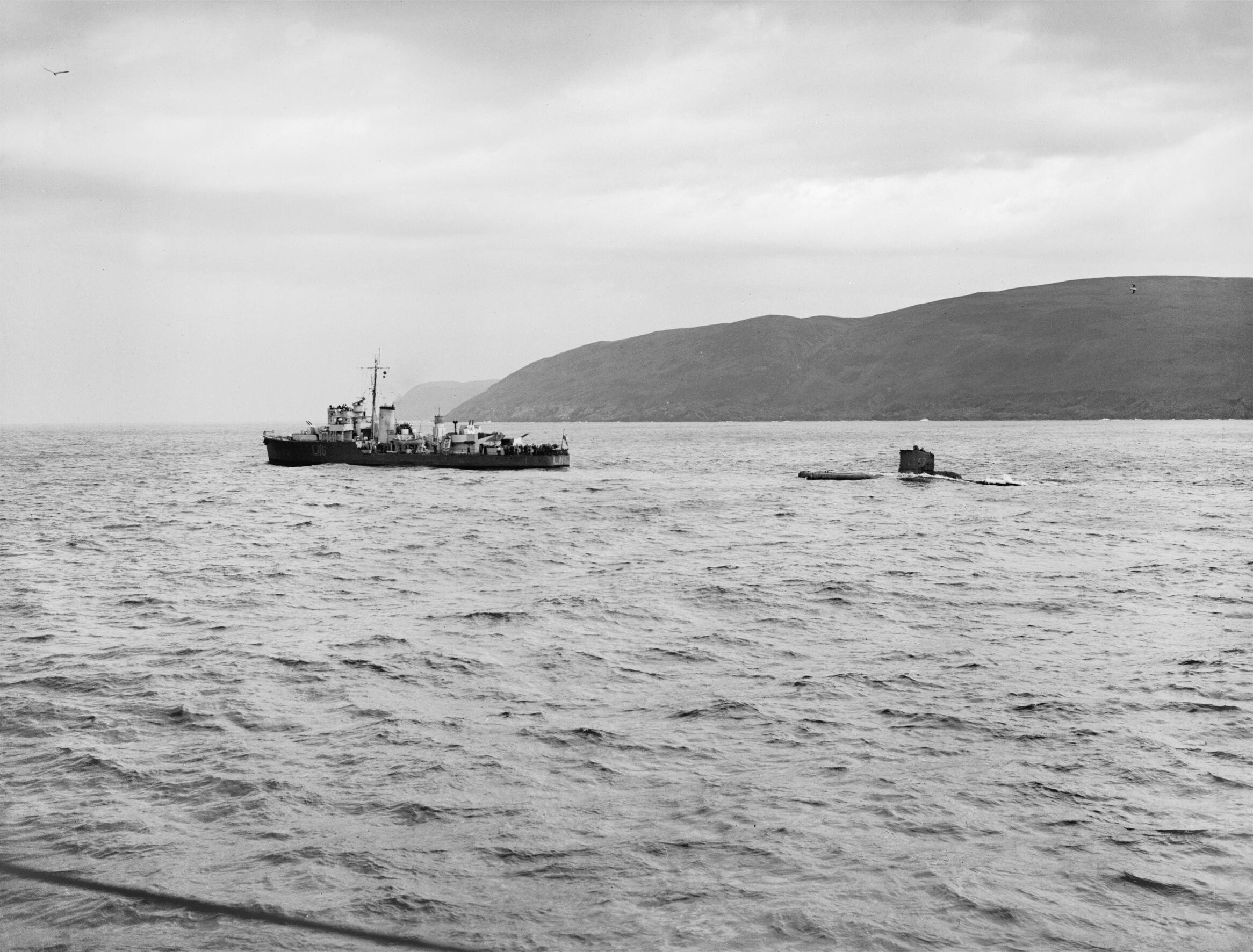
ORP Krakowiak towing U-boat U-2337 out to sea for scuttling, 28 November 1945

At the end of the war, she was active in Operation Deadlight (November 1945 – February 1946), in which German U-boats were towed out to an area north-west of Ireland to be scuttled.

== Postwar ==
After the Allied powers withdrew their support for the Polish government, the ship was decommissioned on 28 September 1946 by the Polish Navy and returned to the British, who re-commissioned her under her original name and placed her in reserve at Devonport. She was reclassified as a frigate and given a new number: F 55. Serving in only rare cases, she spent most of her time in dock, preserved as part of the Reserve Fleet. As such she represented the Reserve Fleet during Queen Elizabeth II's coronation celebrations in Spithead in July 1953. In 1959 she was finally decommissioned and sold to Thos. W. Ward for scrapping, arriving at Grays, Essex, in March of that year.

== Publications ==
- Borowiak, Mariusz (2018). Hunt-class Destroyers in Polish Navy Service. Kagero Publishing. ISBN 978-83-66148-10-9.
- Colledge, J. J.; Warlow, Ben & Bush, Steve (2020). Ships of the Royal Navy: The Complete Record of all Fighting Ships of the Royal Navy from the 15th Century to the Present (5th revised and updated ed.). Seaforth Publishing. ISBN 978-1-5267-9327-0.
- English, John (1987). The Hunts: A History of the Design, Development and Careers of the 86 Destroyers of This Class Built for the Royal and Allied Navies during World War II. World Ship Society. ISBN 0-905617-44-4.
- Friedman, Norman (2008). British Destroyers & Frigates: The Second World War and After. Seaforth Publishing. ISBN 978-1-84832-015-4.
- Lenton, H. T. (1998). British & Empire Warships of the Second World War. Naval Institute Press. ISBN 1-55750-048-7.
- Whitley, M. J. (2000). Destroyers of World War Two: An International Encyclopedia. Cassell & Co. ISBN 1-85409-521-8.
