= HMS Hebe (J24) =

Royal Navy minesweeper

Coordinates: 41°8′N 16°52′E

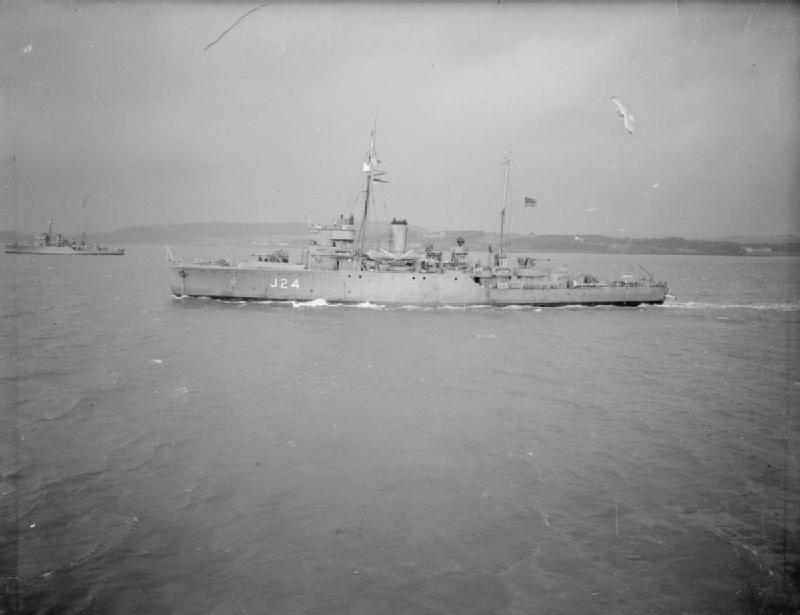
- Hebe photographed from HMS Rodney, October 1940

History

United Kingdom
- Name: HMS Hebe (J24)
- Builder: Devonport Dockyard
- Launched: 28 October 1936
- Commissioned: 1937
- Fate: Mined 22 November 1943

General characteristics
- Class & type: Halcyon-class minesweeper
- Displacement: 875 long tons (889 t) standard; 1,330 long tons (1,351 t) full
- Length: 245 ft 3 in (74.75 m) o/a
- Beam: 33 ft 6 in (10.21 m)
- Draught: 9 ft (2.7 m)
- Installed power: 1,750 ihp (1,300 kW); 2 × Admiralty 3-drum boilers
- Propulsion: 2 shafts; 2 compound-expansion steam engines
- Speed: 16.5 knots (30.6 km/h; 19.0 mph)
- Range: 6,000 nmi (11,000 km; 6,900 mi) at 10 knots (19 km/h; 12 mph)
- Complement: 80
- Armament: 2 × single QF 4-inch (100 mm) guns; 1 × quadruple Vickers .50 machine gun mount

HMS Hebe was one of 21 Halcyon-class minesweepers built for the Royal Navy in the 1930s. Commissioned in 1936, Hebe served during World War II, notably taking part in the Dunkirk evacuation in 1940 and then serving in the Mediterranean, carrying out minesweeping operations from Malta. After taking part in several operations, including Operations Harpoon and Torch, and the invasion of Pantelleria, Hebe was sunk by a mine off Bari in November 1943, with the loss of 37 of the vessel's crew.

== Design and description ==
The Halcyon class was designed as a replacement for the preceding Hunt class and varied in size and propulsion. Hebe displaced 875 long tons (889 t) at standard load and 1,330 long tons (1,350 t) at deep load. The ship had an overall length of 245 feet 3 inches (74.8 m), a beam of 33 feet 6 inches (10.2 m) and a draught of 9 feet (2.7 m). The ship's complement consisted of 80 officers and ratings.

She was powered by two Parsons geared steam turbines, each driving one shaft, using steam provided by two Admiralty three-drum boilers. The engines produced a total of 1,750 shaft horsepower (1,300 kW) and gave a maximum speed of 16.5 knots (30.6 km/h; 19.0 mph). Hebe carried a maximum of 252 long tons (256 t) of fuel oil that gave her a range of 6,000 nautical miles (11,000 km; 6,900 mi) at 10 knots (19 km/h; 12 mph).

Hebe was armed with two QF 4-inch (10.2 cm) anti-aircraft guns. She was also equipped with eight .303-inch (7.7 mm) machine guns. Later in her career, the rear 4-inch gun mount was removed as were most of the .303 machine guns, while one quadruple mount for Vickers .50 machine guns was added as were up to four single or twin mounts for 20 mm Oerlikon antiaircraft guns. For anti-submarine escort, her minesweeping gear could be exchanged for around 40 depth charges.

== Construction and career ==
Hebe was built at the Devonport Dockyard, being laid down on laid down on 27 April 1936. She was launched on 28 October 1936 and she was commissioned in 1937. Her pennant number was N 24, later J 24. The ship served during the evacuation of Dunkirk, where she rescued 365 officers and men, and sent a gig to rescue Lord Gort on 29 May 1940. She later saw service in the Mediterranean Sea based at Malta as part of 14th/17th Minesweeper Flotilla. She participated in Operation Harpoon, where she was hit and extensively damaged by a very long range 152 mm shell shot fired by the Italian cruiser Raimondo Montecuccoli

According to post-battle reports from both sides, Raimondo Montecuccoli scored a hit on Hebe at "approx. 26,000 yards". Fires erupted aboard Hebe, which received extensive splinter damage. Electrical cables to sweep magnetic and acoustic mines, low power wires, steering gear, echo sounding gear and voice pipes were broken, the Kelvin sounding machine and the Commanding Officer's Cabin damaged, while a whaler was left unseaworthy.

Hebe also participated in Operation Torch, and the invasion of Pantelleria. She was sunk by a mine off Bari on 22 November 1943. Thirty-seven men from her complement were lost with the ship.

== Bibliography ==
- Chesneau, Roger, ed. (1980). Conway's All the World's Fighting Ships 1922–1946. Greenwich, UK: Conway Maritime Press. ISBN 0-85177-146-7.
- Colledge, J. J.; Warlow, Ben (2006) [1969]. Ships of the Royal Navy: The Complete Record of All Fighting Ships of the Royal Navy from the 15th Century to the Present (3rd Rev ed.). London: Chatham Publishing. ISBN 978-1-86176-281-8. OCLC 67375475.
- Lenton, H. T. (1998). British & Empire Warships of the Second World War. Annapolis, Maryland: Naval Institute Press. ISBN 1-55750-048-7.
