= John Andrew Pearson (Royal Navy officer) =

Lieutenant Commander John Andrew Pearson, RNR, DSC and bar was an officer in the Royal Navy during the Second World War.

Pearson ("Iain") was an officer in the Royal Naval Reserve. His wartime service began with coastal minesweeping forces at HMS Lynx in Dover, then as captain of the Bangor-class minesweeper HMS Rye, and finally as captain of the Algerine-class minesweeper HMS Welfare. He ended the war with the rank of Lieutenant-Commander.

== Decorations ==
Pearson was awarded a Distinguished Service Cross (DSC) in the New Year Honours on 1 January 1940 for minesweeping service at HMS Lynx.

He was awarded a Bar to his DSC on 10 November 1942 for his service during Operation Pedestal in command of HMS Rye, which included the rescue of the American oil tanker SS Ohio.

He was Mentioned in Dispatches (MID) in the King's Birthday Honours on 2 June 1943, and was mentioned a second time on 23 November 1943 for Rye's defence of convoys against air attack.

Person was mentioned in dispatches for a third time on 27 March 1945 for services during Operation Dragoon as commander of HMS Welfare, and for a fourth time on 14 August 1945 for services with Welfare during the relief of Greece.

== Sources ==
- Malta Convoy, by P. Shankland & A. Hunter, pub. Collins (1961).
