= HMS Rye (J76) =

Minesweeper of the Royal Navy

History

United Kingdom
- Name: HMS Rye
- Builder: Ailsa Shipbuilding Co. Ltd., Troon, Scotland
- Laid down: 27 November 1939
- Launched: 19 August 1940
- Commissioned: 20 November 1941
- Fate: Sold on 24 August 1948; Scrapped at Purfleet in September 1948.
- Badge: On a Field per Pale Red and Blue, a demi-lion passant, Gold langued and armed Blue conjoined to the hulk of a ship White.

General characteristics
- Class & type: Bangor-class minesweeper
- Displacement: 656 long tons (667 t) standard; 820 long tons (833 t) full
- Length: 174 ft (53 m) o/a
- Beam: 28 ft 6 in (8.69 m)
- Draught: 10 ft 3 in (3.12 m)
- Installed power: 2,000 ihp (1,500 kW); 2 × Admiralty 3-drum boilers
- Propulsion: 2 shafts; 2 steam turbines
- Speed: 16 knots (30 km/h; 18 mph)
- Range: 2,800 nmi (5,200 km; 3,200 mi) at 10 knots (19 km/h; 12 mph)
- Complement: 60
- Armament: 1 × single 12-pounder 3-inch (76 mm) anti-aircraft gun; 1 × single QF 2-pounder (4 cm) AA gun

HMS Rye (J76) was a Bangor-class minesweeper built for the Royal Navy during the Second World War.

== Design and description ==
The Bangor class was designed as a small minesweeper that could be easily built in large numbers by civilian shipyards; as steam turbines were difficult to manufacture, the ships were designed to accept a wide variety of engines. Rye displaced 656 long tons (667 t) at standard load and 820 long tons (830 t) at deep load. The ship had an overall length of 174 feet (53.0 m), a beam of 28 feet 6 inches (8.7 m) and a draught of 10 feet 3 inches (3.1 m). The ship's complement consisted of 60 officers and ratings.

She was powered by two Parsons geared steam turbines, each driving one shaft, using steam provided by two Admiralty three-drum boilers. The engines produced a total of 2,000 shaft horsepower (1,500 kW) and gave a maximum speed of 16 knots (30 km/h; 18 mph). Rye carried a maximum of 160 long tons (163 t) of fuel oil that gave her a range of 2,800 nautical miles (5,200 km; 3,200 mi) at 10 knots (19 km/h; 12 mph).

The turbine-powered Bangors were armed with a 12-pounder 3-inch (76 mm) anti-aircraft gun and a single QF 2-pounder (4 cm) AA gun. In some ships the 2-pounder was replaced a single or twin 20 mm Oerlikon AA gun, while most ships were fitted with four additional single Oerlikon mounts over the course of the war. For escort work, her minesweeping gear could be exchanged for around 40 depth charges.

== Construction and career ==
Rye was built by the Ailsa Shipbuilding Co. Ltd. in Troon, Scotland and commissioned in 1941. Her pennant number was J 76. Rye served in the Mediterranean Sea based in Malta as part of the 14th/17th Minesweeper Flotilla. She took part in the Malta Convoys, notably Operation Harpoon during which she rescued 84 survivors from the SS Chant, and in Operation Pedestal during which she was one of the ships that rescued the SS Ohio. The Rye's captain, Iain Pearson, was awarded a bar to his DSC for service during the Malta Convoys.

After the Mediterranean, Rye returned to Home waters and served with the 14th M/S Flotilla based in Plymouth. She was part of Operation Neptune, the naval component of Operation Overlord (D-Day). The flotilla participated in minesweeping operations from 5–30 June, initially clearing paths through the German minefields to the invasion beaches, and subsequently clearing wider areas to allow transport and supply vessels to operate in safety.

== Postwar ==
Rye was decommissioned on 24 August 1948. She was scrapped at Purfleet in Essex in September 1948. Her ensign is laid up in St Mary's parish church in the town of Rye, East Sussex.

The Rye and District Sea Cadets maintain the traditions of HMS Rye.

== Bibliography ==
- Chesneau, Roger, ed. (1980). Conway's All the World's Fighting Ships 1922–1946. Greenwich, UK: Conway Maritime Press. ISBN 0-85177-146-7.
- Colledge, J. J.; Warlow, Ben (2006) [1969]. Ships of the Royal Navy: The Complete Record of All Fighting Ships of the Royal Navy from the 15th Century to the Present (3rd Rev ed.). London: Chatham Publishing. ISBN 978-1-86176-281-8. OCLC 67375475.
- Crabb, Brian James (2014). Operation Pedestal: The story of Convoy WS21S in August 1942. England: Shaun Tyas. ISBN 978-1-907730-19-1.
- Lenton, H. T. (1998). British & Empire Warships of the Second World War. Annapolis, Maryland: Naval Institute Press. ISBN 1-55750-048-7.
