= HMS Ithuriel (H05) =

Destroyer of the Royal Navy

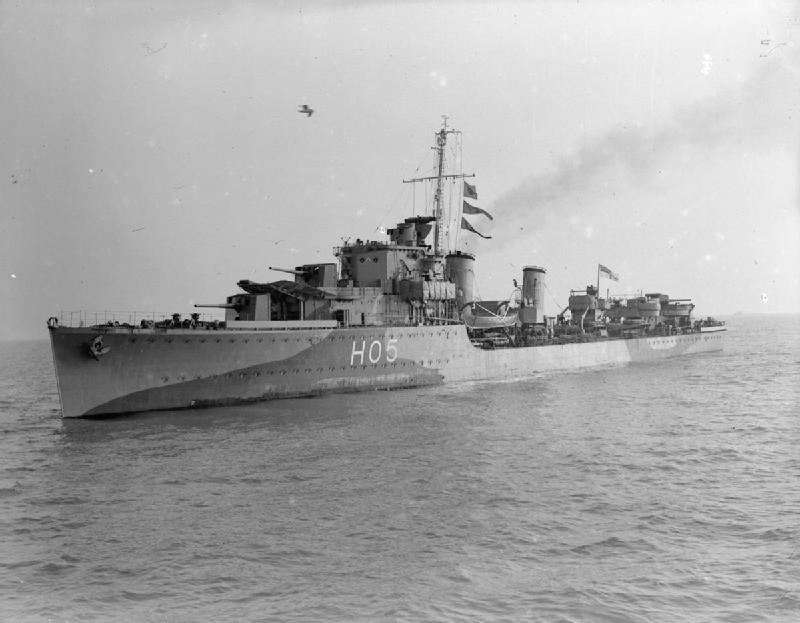

History

United Kingdom
- Name: Ithuriel
- Builder: Vickers-Armstrongs
- Laid down: 24 May 1939
- Launched: 15 December 1940
- Commissioned: 3 March 1942
- Identification: Pennant number: H05
- Fate: Damaged beyond repair by enemy aircraft, 28 November 1942

General characteristics (as built)
- Class & type: I-class destroyer
- Displacement: 1,360 long tons (1,380 t) (standard); 1,880 long tons (1,910 t) (deep load)
- Length: 323 ft (98.5 m)
- Beam: 33 ft (10.1 m)
- Draught: 12 ft 6 in (3.8 m)
- Installed power: 3 Admiralty 3-drum boilers; 34,000 shp (25,000 kW)
- Propulsion: 2 shafts, 2 geared steam turbines
- Speed: 35.5 knots (65.7 km/h; 40.9 mph)
- Range: 5,500 nmi (10,200 km; 6,300 mi) at 15 knots (28 km/h; 17 mph)
- Complement: 145
- Sensors & processing systems: ASDIC; Type 286 search radar
- Armament: 4 × single 4.7 in (120 mm) guns; 1 × single 12 pdr (3 in (76 mm)) AA gun; 4 × single 20 mm (0.8 in) AA guns; 1 × quadruple 21 in (533 mm) torpedo tubes; 1 × rack and 2 throwers for 35 depth charges

Service record
- Operations: Operation Harpoon (1942); Operation Pedestal

HMS Ithuriel was an I-class destroyer built for the Turkish Navy, but was purchased by the Royal Navy in 1939.

== Description ==
The I-class ships were improved versions of the preceding H-class. They displaced 1,370 long tons (1,390 t) at standard load and 1,888 long tons (1,918 t) at deep load. The ships had an overall length of 323 feet (98.5 m), a beam of 33 feet (10.1 m) and a draught of 12 feet 6 inches (3.8 m). They were powered by two Parsons geared steam turbines, each driving one propeller shaft, using steam provided by three Admiralty three-drum boilers. The turbines developed a total of 34,000 shaft horsepower (25,000 kW) and were intended to give a maximum speed of 35.5 knots (65.7 km/h; 40.9 mph). Ithuriel reached a speed of 32.6 knots (60.4 km/h; 37.5 mph) from 34,368 shp (25,628 kW) during her sea trials. The ships carried enough fuel oil to give them a range of 5,500 nautical miles (10,200 km; 6,300 mi) at 15 knots (28 km/h; 17 mph). Their crew numbered 145 officers and ratings.

The ships mounted four 4.7-inch (120 mm) Mark IX guns in single mounts, designated 'A', 'B', 'X' and 'Y' from bow to stern. While under construction, their anti-aircraft (AA) armament was augmented by a single 12-pounder (3 in (76 mm)) AA gun that replaced the planned aft set of torpedo tubes. In addition the intended pair of quadruple mounts for the 0.5 inch Vickers Mark III machine gun were replaced by a pair of 20-millimeter (0.8 in) Oerlikon light AA guns. The Turkish ships were fitted with a single above-water quadruple torpedo tube mount amidships for 21-inch (533 mm) torpedoes. One depth charge rack and two throwers were fitted for 35 depth charges. The Turkish ships were fitted with the ASDIC sound detection system to locate submarines underwater and a Type 286 search radar.

== Construction and career ==
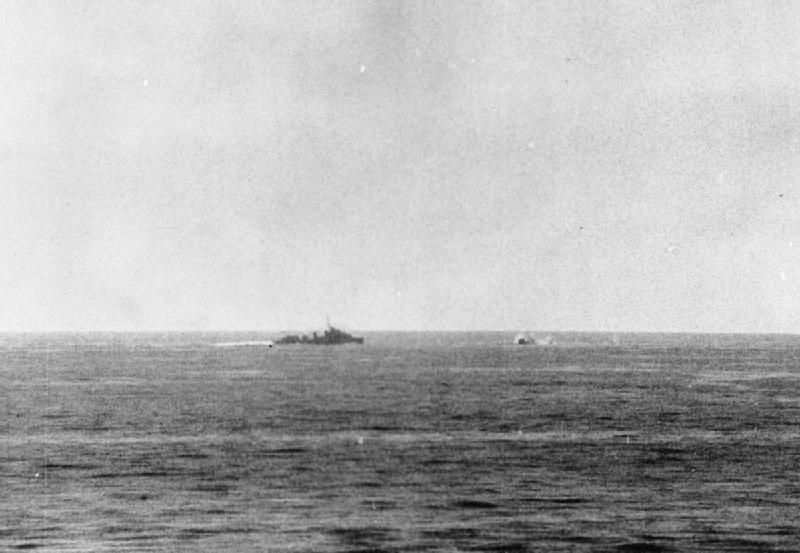
Ithuriel coming in to ram the Cobalto, 12 August 1942

Ithuriel was laid down as Gayret for the Turkish Navy by Vickers Armstrong at their Barrow-in-Furness shipyard on 24 May 1939, but it was taken over by the Royal Navy at the outbreak of the Second World War whilst still under construction. She was launched on 15 December 1940 and commissioned on 3 March 1942. In the Second World War, she took part in Operation Harpoon & Operation Pedestal, the escorting of convoys to Malta in June & August 1942. During Operation Pedestal, she depth charged & rammed the Italian submarine Cobalto, causing the submarine to sink.

Ithuriel was attacked by German aircraft at Bone in Algeria on the night of 27–28 November 1942 and damaged beyond repair. On 29 November, she was beached &temporary repairs were started. In January 1943, repairs proceeded enough to allow for towing. On 27 February, the destroyer was towed to Algiers for survey. In March, Ithuriel was declared beyond local repair and laid up at Algiers.

In August, she was prepared for tow to Gibraltar. On 18 August, she sailed under tow from Algiers to Gibraltar. That September Ithuriel was placed in care and maintenance for use at Gibraltar. In October, she was deployed at Gibraltar for accommodation & training duties.

In July 1944, the vessel was prepared for tow to the United Kingdom. On 1 August, Ithuriel began her passage to Plymouth under tow by the tug Prosperous. On 8 August, she was paid off on arrival at Plymouth and placed on the Disposal List. The destroyer was sold to the British Iron & Steel Corporation for demolition by P & W McLellan. On 11 August, Ithuriel made her final voyage to Bo'ness, near Edinburgh. She arrived on 13 August at the breaker's yard. (Discrepancy in records as to whether she was sold for scrap in 1944 or 1945.)

== Bibliography ==
- Colledge, J. J.; Warlow, Ben (2006) [1969]. Ships of the Royal Navy: The Complete Record of All Fighting Ships of the Royal Navy from the 15th Century to the Present (3rd Rev ed.). London: Chatham Publishing. ISBN 978-1-86176-281-8. OCLC 67375475.
- Crabb, Brian James (2014). Operation Pedestal: The story of Convoy WS21S in August 1942. England: Shaun Tyas. ISBN 978-1-907730-19-1.
- English, John (1993). Amazon to Ivanhoe: British Standard Destroyers of the 1930s. Kendal, England: World Ship Society. ISBN 0-905617-64-9.
- Friedman, Norman (2006). British Destroyers & Frigates: The Second World War and After. Annapolis, Maryland: Naval Institute Press. ISBN 1-86176-137-6.
- Hastings, Max (2021). Operation Pedestal: The Fleet That Battled to Malta, 1942. HarperCollins. ISBN 978-0-06-298015-1.
- Hodges, Peter & Friedman, Norman (1979). Destroyer Weapons of World War 2. Greenwich: Conway Maritime Press. ISBN 978-0-85177-137-3.
- Lenton, H. T. (1998). British & Empire Warships of the Second World War. Annapolis, Maryland: Naval Institute Press. ISBN 1-55750-048-7.
- March, Edgar J. (1966). British Destroyers: A History of Development, 1892-1953; Drawn by Admiralty Permission From Official Records & Returns, Ships' Covers & Building Plans. London: Seeley Service. OCLC 164893555.
- Rohwer, Jürgen (2005). Chronology of the War at Sea 1939–1945: The Naval History of World War Two (Third Revised ed.). Annapolis, Maryland: Naval Institute Press. ISBN 1-59114-119-2.
- Whitley, M. J. (1988). Destroyers of World War Two: An International Encyclopedia. Annapolis, Maryland: Naval Institute Press. ISBN 0-87021-326-1.
