= HMS Speedy (J17) =

Minesweeper of the Royal Navy

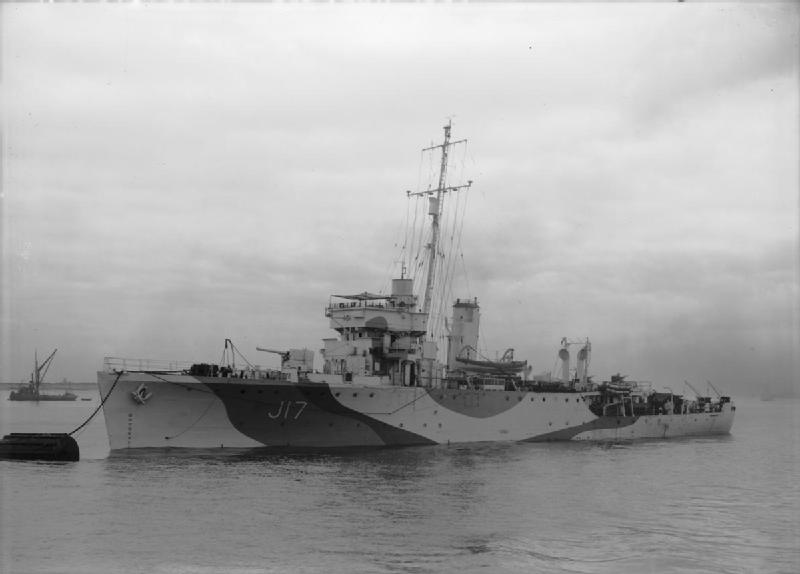
- Speedy in April 1944

History

United Kingdom
- Name: HMS Speedy
- Operator: Royal Navy
- Builder: William Hamilton & Co. / J. S. White & Co.
- Laid down: 1 December 1937
- Launched: 23 November 1938
- Commissioned: 7 April 1939
- Identification: Pennant = N17 / J17
- Fate: Sold 5 November 1946, scrapped 1957

General characteristics
- Class & type: Halcyon-class minesweeper
- Displacement: 815 long tons (828 t) standard; 1,330 long tons (1,351 t) full
- Length: 245 ft 3 in (74.75 m) o/a
- Beam: 33 ft 6 in (10.21 m)
- Draught: 8 ft 9 in (2.67 m)
- Installed power: 1,750 ihp (1,300 kW); 2 × Admiralty 3-drum boilers
- Propulsion: 2 shafts; 2 steam turbines
- Speed: 16.5 knots (30.6 km/h; 19.0 mph)
- Range: 6,000 nmi (11,000 km; 6,900 mi) at 10 knots (19 km/h; 12 mph)
- Complement: 157
- Armament: 2 × single QF 4-inch (100 mm) guns; 1 × quadruple Vickers .50 machine gun mount

HMS Speedy was one of 21 Halcyon-class minesweepers built for the Royal Navy in the 1930s.

== Design and description ==
The Halcyon class designed as a replacement for the preceding Hunt class and varied in size and propulsion. Speedy displaced 815 long tons (828 t) at standard load and 1,330 long tons (1,350 t) at deep load. The ship had an overall length of 245 feet 3 inches (74.8 m), a beam of 33 feet 6 inches (10.2 m) and a draught of 8 feet 9 inches (2.7 m). The ship's complement consisted of 80 officers and ratings.

She was powered by two Parsons geared steam turbines, each driving one shaft, using steam provided by two Admiralty three-drum boilers. The engines produced a total of 1,750 shaft horsepower (1,300 kW) and gave a maximum speed of 16.5 knots (30.6 km/h; 19.0 mph). Speedy carried a maximum of 252 long tons (256 t) of fuel oil that gave her a range of 6,000 nautical miles (11,000 km; 6,900 mi) at 10 knots (19 km/h; 12 mph).

Speedy was armed with two QF 4-inch (10.2 cm) anti-aircraft guns. She was also equipped with eight .303-inch (7.7 mm) machine guns. Later in her career, the rear 4-inch gun mount was removed as were most of the .303 machine guns, one quadruple mount for Vickers .50 machine guns was added as were up to four single or twin mounts for 20 mm Oerlikon AA guns. For escort work, her minesweeping gear could be exchanged for around 40 depth charges.

== Construction and career ==
Speedy was built by William Hamilton & Co. at Port Glasgow, Scotland and completed at J. S. White & Co. at Cowes, Isle of Wight. She was commissioned in 1939. Her pennant number was N 17, later J 17. HMS Speedy saw service in the Mediterranean Sea based at Malta as part of 14th/17th Minesweeper Flotilla. In May 1943 she hit a mine, which resulted in the deaths of four crewmen, with eight injured. The ship was badly damaged but remained afloat and was towed to harbour for repairs. The ship was sold into mercantile service in 1946 and renamed Speedon. She was scrapped at Aden in 1957.

== Bibliography ==
- Chesneau, Roger, ed. (1980). Conway's All the World's Fighting Ships 1922–1946. Greenwich, UK: Conway Maritime Press. ISBN 0-85177-146-7.
- Colledge, J. J.; Warlow, Ben (2006) [1969]. Ships of the Royal Navy: The Complete Record of All Fighting Ships of the Royal Navy from the 15th Century to the Present (3rd Rev ed.). London: Chatham Publishing. ISBN 978-1-86176-281-8. OCLC 67375475.
- Crabb, Brian James (2014). Operation Pedestal: The story of Convoy WS21S in August 1942. England: Shaun Tyas. ISBN 978-1-907730-19-1.
- Lenton, H. T. (1998). British & Empire Warships of the Second World War. Annapolis, Maryland: Naval Institute Press. ISBN 1-55750-048-7.
