= HMS Hythe =

UK Bangor-class minesweeper

Coordinates: 37°4′N 5°0′E

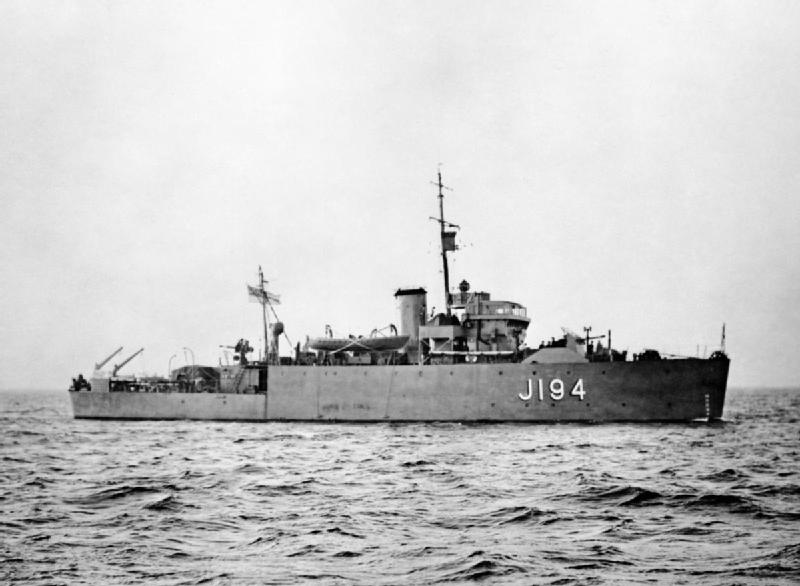

History

United Kingdom
- Name: HMS Hythe
- Builder: Ailsa Shipbuilding Co. Ltd., Troon
- Laid down: 20 July 1940
- Launched: 4 September 1941
- Commissioned: 5 March 1942
- Fate: Sunk on 11 October 1943

General characteristics
- Class & type: Bangor-class minesweeper
- Displacement: 656 long tons (667 t) standard; 820 long tons (833 t) full
- Length: 174 ft (53 m) o/a
- Beam: 28 ft 6 in (8.69 m)
- Draught: 10 ft 3 in (3.12 m)
- Installed power: 2,000 ihp (1,500 kW); 2 × Admiralty 3-drum boilers
- Propulsion: 2 shafts; 2 steam turbines
- Speed: 16 knots (30 km/h; 18 mph)
- Range: 2,800 nmi (5,200 km; 3,200 mi) at 10 knots (19 km/h; 12 mph)
- Complement: 60
- Armament: 1 × single 12-pounder 3-inch (76 mm) anti-aircraft gun; 1 × single QF 2-pounder (4 cm) AA gun

HMS Hythe was a Bangor-class minesweeper built for the Royal Navy during the Second World War.

== Design and description ==
The Bangor class was designed as a small minesweeper that could be easily built in large numbers by civilian shipyards; as steam turbines were difficult to manufacture, the ships were designed to accept a wide variety of engines. Hythe displaced 656 long tons (667 t) at standard load and 820 long tons (830 t) at deep load. The ship had an overall length of 174 feet (53.0 m), a beam of 28 feet 6 inches (8.7 m) and a draught of 10 feet 3 inches (3.1 m). The ship's complement consisted of 60 officers and ratings.

She was powered by two Parsons geared steam turbines, each driving one shaft, using steam provided by two Admiralty three-drum boilers. The engines produced a total of 2,000 shaft horsepower (1,500 kW) and gave a maximum speed of 16 knots (30 km/h; 18 mph). Hythe carried a maximum of 160 long tons (163 t) of fuel oil that gave her a range of 2,800 nautical miles (5,200 km; 3,200 mi) at 10 knots (19 km/h; 12 mph).

The turbine-powered Bangors were armed with a 12-pounder 3-inch (76 mm) anti-aircraft gun and a single QF 2-pounder (4 cm) AA gun. In some ships the 2-pounder was replaced a single or twin 20 mm Oerlikon AA gun, while most ships were fitted with four additional single Oerlikon mounts over the course of the war. For escort work, her minesweeping gear could be exchanged for around 40 depth charges.

== Construction and career ==
Hythe was built by Ailsa Shipbuilding Co. Ltd. in Troon, Scotland and commissioned in 1941. Her pennant number was J 194. So far she has been the only ship of the Royal Navy to bear the name Hythe, after the town of Hythe in Kent, however, the SS Hythe, a cross-channel ferry of the South Eastern and Chatham Railway, built by Denny, Dumbarton, was requisitioned by the Royal Navy in 1914, converted to a minesweeper and became HMS Hythe; whilst in later use as a troop carrier she was run down by HMS Sarnia off Cape Helles in the Dardanelles on 28 October 1915 and sank with the loss of 155 lives.

Hythe saw service in the Mediterranean Sea during the Second World War, where she was based in Malta as part of the 14th/17th Minesweeper Flotilla. She was torpedoed and sunk by the German submarine U-371 commanded by Waldemar Mehl on 11 October 1943 off Bougie, Algeria.

== Bibliography ==
- Chesneau, Roger, ed. (1980). Conway's All the World's Fighting Ships 1922–1946. Greenwich, UK: Conway Maritime Press. ISBN 0-85177-146-7.
- Colledge, J. J.; Warlow, Ben (2006) [1969]. Ships of the Royal Navy: The Complete Record of All Fighting Ships of the Royal Navy from the 15th Century to the Present (3rd Rev ed.). London: Chatham Publishing. ISBN 978-1-86176-281-8. OCLC 67375475.
- Lenton, H. T. (1998). British & Empire Warships of the Second World War. Annapolis, Maryland: Naval Institute Press. ISBN 1-55750-048-7.
