= List of ship launches in 1940 =

The list of ship launches in 1940 includes a chronological list of some ships launched in 1940.

Date	Ship	Class	Builder	Location	Country	Notes
2 January	St. Vincent	Coaster	Charles Hill & Sons Ltd.	Bristol	United Kingdom	For Osborn & Wallis Ltd.
8 January	Barbain	Bar-class boom defence vessel	Blyth Dry Docks & Shipbuilding Co. Ltd	Blyth, Northumberland	United Kingdom	For Royal Navy.
9 January	Athelcrest	Tanker	Sir James Laing & Sons Ltd.	Sunderland	United Kingdom	For Athel Line Ltd.
9 January	Derwenthall	Cargo ship	William Doxford & Sons Ltd.	Pallion	United Kingdom	For West Hartlepool Steam Navigatio Co. Ltd.
9 January	Confield	Cargo ship	J. L. Thompson & Sons Ltd.	Sunderland	United Kingdom	For Confield Steamship Co. Ltd.
9 January	Fernie	Hunt-class destroyer	John Brown and Company	Clydebank	United Kingdom	
9 January	Trevaylor	Cargo ship	Barclay, Curle & Co. Ltd.	Glasgow	United Kingdom	For Hain Steamship Co.
11 January	Dominence	Coaster	James Pollock & Sons	Faversham	United Kingdom	For London & Rochester Trading Co. Ltd.
18 January	Peter Joliffe	Tug	Charles Hill & Sons Ltd.	Bristol	United Kingdom	For Poole Harbour Commissioners.
24 January	Ariosto	Cargo ship	Swan, Hunter & Wigham Richardson Ltd.	Newcastle upon Tyne	United Kingdom	For Ellermans Wilson Line Ltd.
24 January	Catrine	Cargo ship	William Doxford & Sons Ltd.	Pallion	United Kingdom	For Pontypridd Steamship Co.
24 January	Moorwood	C-type coaster	S. P. Austin & Sons Ltd.	Sunderland	United Kingdom	For Wm. France, Fenwick & Co. Ltd.
24 January	Mormacmail	Merchant	Sun Shipbuilding		United States	Converted to escort carrier USS Long Island in 1941
24 January	Gladiolus	Flower-class corvette	Smiths Dock Company	River Tees	United Kingdom	
25 January	Barnby	Cargo ship	Short Brothers Ltd.	Sunderland	United Kingdom	For Rowland & Marwoods Steamship Co. Ltd.
25 January	Ben Hann	Coastal tanker	Rowhedge Ironworks Ltd	Rowhedge	United Kingdom	For National Benzole Co. Ltd.
25 January	Exmoor	Hunt-class destroyer	Vickers-Armstrongs	Tyneside	United Kingdom	
25 January	Hawarden Bridge	Coaster	Scott & Sons Ltd.	Bowling	United Kingdom	For J. Summers & Sons Ltd.
25 January	Ottinge	Cargo ship	William Gray & Co. Ltd.	West Hartlepool	United Kingdom	For Ellerman & Papayannie Lines Ltd.
25 January	Florian	Cargo ship	William Gray & Co. Ltd.	West Hartlepool	United Kingdom	For Constants Ltd.
27 January	Fir	Tree-class trawler	Harland & Wolff	Govan	United Kingdom	For Royal Navy.
29 January	Berkeley	Hunt-class destroyer	Cammel Laird	Birkenhead	United Kingdom	
January	SK-124	Tank barge	Alabama Drydock and Shipbuilding Company	Mobile, Alabama	United States	For Southern Kraft Corporation.
January	SK-125	Tank barge	Alabama Drydock and Shipbuilding Company	Mobile, Alabama	United States	For Southern Kraft Corporation.
January	SK-126	Tank barge	Alabama Drydock and Shipbuilding Company	Mobile, Alabama	United States	For Southern Kraft Corporation.
January	SK-127	Tank barge	Alabama Drydock and Shipbuilding Company	Mobile, Alabama	United States	For Southern Kraft Corporation.
2 February	Kalewa	Cargo ship	William Denny and Brothers Ltd.	Dumbarton	United Kingdom	For British & Burmese Steam Navigation Co. Ltd.
7 February	Burgeo	Ferry	Fleming & Furguson Ltd.	Paisley	United Kingdom	For Government of Newfoundland.
8 February	Barcote	Bar-class boom defence vessel	Blyth Dry Docks & Shipbuilding Co. Ltd	Blyth, Northumberland	United Kingdom	For Royal Navy.
8 February	Holderness	Hunt-class destroyer	Swan Hunter	Wallsend	United Kingdom	
8 February	Madras City	Cargo ship	Furness Shipbuilding Co Ltd	Haverton Hill-on-Tees	United Kingdom	For Reardon Smith Line Ltd.
8 February	Sutlej	Cargo ship	Charles Connell & Co Ltd	Glasgow	United Kingdom	For J. Nourse Ltd.
10 February	Manchester Merchant	Cargo ship	Blythswood Shipbuilding Co. Ltd.	Glasgow	United Kingdom	For Manchester Liners Ltd.
12 February	St. Zeno	Fishing trawler	Cook, Welton & Gemmell Ltd.	Beverley	United Kingdom	For T. Hambling & Co. Ltd.
13 February	Pytchley	Hunt-class destroyer	Scotts	Greenock	United Kingdom	
14 February	Arabis	Flower-class corvette	Harland & Wolff	Belfast	United Kingdom	For Royal Navy.
14 February	Garth	Hunt-class destroyer	John Brown and Company	Clydebank	United Kingdom	
21 February	Glenwood	Cargo ship	Sir James Laing & Sons Ltd.	Sunderland	United Kingdom	For J. I. Jacobs Ltd.
22 February	Angelo	Cargo ship	Swan, Hunter & Wigham Richardson Ltd.	Newcastle upon Tyne	United Kingdom	For Ellermans Wilson Line Ltd.
22 February	Cattistock	Hunt-class destroyer	Yarrow	Glasgow	United Kingdom	
22 February	Heinrich Jessen	Cargo ship	Hong Kong & Whampoa Dock Co. Ltd.	Hong Kong	Hong Kong	For Rhederi M. Jebsen A/S.
22 February	Ribera	Cargo ship	Lithgows Ltd.	Port Glasgow	United Kingdom	For Bolton Steam Shipping Co Ltd.
23 February	Graiglas	Cargo ship	J. L. Thompson & Sons Ltd.	Sunderland	United Kingdom	For Graig Shipping Co. Ltd.
24 February	Anson	King George V-class battleship	Swan Hunter	Wallsend	United Kingdom	
24 February	Periwinkle	Flower-class corvette	Harland & Wolff	Belfast	United Kingdom	For Royal Navy.
24 February	Winkleigh	Cargo ship	William Pickersgill & Co. Ltd.	Southwick	United Kingdom	For W. J. Tatum Ltd.
26 February	Sutherland	Cargo ship	William Doxford & Sons Ltd.	Pallion	United Kingdom	For B. J. Sutherland & Co. Ltd.
27 February	MSC Merlin	Tug	Henry Robb Ltd.	Leith	United Kingdom	For Manchester Ship Canal Company.
27 February	Triton	Lighthouse Tender	Cochrane & Sons Ltd	Selby	United Kingdom	For Trinity House.
28 February	Duke of York	King George V-class battleship	John Brown and Company	Clydebank	United Kingdom	
29 February	Empress Queen	C-type coaster	Ailsa Shipbuilding Co Ltd.	Troon	United Kingdom	For P. & A. Campbell Ltd. Requisitioned by the Admiralty, converted to a troopship.
February	Malangen	Trawler	G. Seebeck A.G.	Wesermünde	Germany	Captured by Norway 13 April 1940 and renamed HNoMS Honningsvåg
February	2 unnamed vessels	Tank barges	Alabama Drydock and Shipbuilding Company	Mobile, Alabama	United States	For private owners.
4 March	Markay	Maritime Commission Type N tanker	Federal Shipbuilding and Drydock Company	Kearny, New Jersey	United States	
6 March	Jean Bart	Richelieu-class battleship	Chantiers de la Loire and Chantiers de Penhoët	Saint-Nazaire	France	
7 March	Clarkia	Flower-class corvette	Harland & Wolff	Belfast	United Kingdom	For Royal Navy.
7 March	Lancastrian Prince	Cargo ship	Smith's Dock Co. Ltd.	Middlesbrough	United Kingdom	For Prince Line Ltd.
7 March	Orient City	Cargo ship	Furness Shipbuilding Co Ltd	Haverton Hill-on-Tees	United Kingdom	For Reardon Smith Line Ltd.
9 March	Seapool	Cargo ship	Burntisland Shipbuilding Company	Burntisland	United Kingdom	For Pool Shipping Co. Ltd.
12 March	Itria	Cargo ship	Barclay, Curle & Co. Ltd.	Glasgow	United Kingdom	For British India Steam Navigation Company.
14 March	Ger-Y-Bryn	Cargo ship	Burntisland Shipbuilding Company	Burntisland	United Kingdom	For Ambrose, Davies & Matthews Ltd.
16 March	PG-555	Fishing trawler	Schichau Seebeckwerft	Bremerhaven	Germany	For Grundmann & Gröschel
21 March	Calendula	Flower-class corvette	Harland & Wolff	Belfast	United Kingdom	For Royal Navy.
21 March	Lavington Court	Cargo ship	Harland & Wolff	Belfast	United Kingdom	For Court Line.
21 March	Picotee	Flower-class corvette	Harland & Wolff	Belfast	United Kingdom	For Royal Navy.
21 March	Rawnsley	Cargo ship	William Doxford & Sons Ltd.	Pallion	United Kingdom	For Red 'R' Shipping Co. Ltd.
21 March	Tottenham	Cargo ship	Caledon Shipbuilding & Engineering Co. Ltd.	Dundee	United Kingdom	For Britain Steamship Co.
22 March	Harpalyce	Cargo ship	Bartram & Sons Ltd	Sunderland	United Kingdom	For J & C. Harrison Ltd.
22 March	Baluchistan	Cargo ship	John Readhead & Sons Ltd.	South Shields	United Kingdom	For Strick Line.
23 March	Debrett	Cargo ship	Harland & Wolff	Belfast	United Kingdom	For Lamport & Holt.
23 March	Industria	Cargo ship	William Gray & Co. Ltd.	West Hartlepool	United Kingdom	For Metcalfe Shipping Co. Ltd.
26 March	Iris	Cable laying ship	Swan, Hunter & Wigham Richardson Ltd.	Newcastle upon Tyne	United Kingdom	For H. M. Postmaster General.
26 March	Dalesman	Cargo ship	Lithgows Ltd.	Port Glasgow	United Kingdom	For T. & J. Harrison.
26 March	Uskbridge	Cargo ship	Burntisland Shipbuilding Company	Burntisland	United Kingdom	For Uskport Steamship Co. Ltd.
27 March	Quorn	Hunt-class destroyer	J. Samuel White	Cowes	United Kingdom	
27 March	Staley Bridge	Coaster	Scott & Sons Ltd.	Bowling	United Kingdom	For J. Summers & Sons Ltd.
March	Hanyang	Cargo ship	Taikoo Dockyard & Engineering Company of Hong Kong Ltd.	Hong Kong	Hong Kong	For China Navigation Co. Ltd.
6 April	Hibiscus	Flower-class corvette	Harland & Wolff	Belfast	United Kingdom	For Royal Navy.
9 April	Howe	King George V-class battleship	Fairfield	Govan	United Kingdom	
9 April	Mendip	Hunt-class destroyer	Swan Hunter	Wallsend	United Kingdom	
9 April	Thistlegorm	Cargo ship	J. L. Thompson & Sons Ltd.	Sunderland	United Kingdom	For The Albyn Line Ltd.
9 April	Tynemouth	Cargo ship	Sir James Laing & Sons Ltd.	Sunderland	United Kingdom	For Burnett Steamship Co.
10 April	Marietta E.	Cargo ship	William Hamilton & Co. Ltd.	Port Glasgow	United Kingdom	For Leith Hill Shipping Co. Ltd.
10 April	Trevethoe	Cargo ship	Alexander Stephen & Sons Ltd.	Linthouse	United Kingdom	For Hain Steamship Co. Ltd.
11 April	Vizalma	Fishing trawler	Cook, Welton & Gemmell Ltd.	Beverley	United Kingdom	For Atlas Steam Fishing Co. Ltd.
19 April	Barlake	Bar-class boom defence vessel	Blyth Dry Docks & Shipbuilding Co. Ltd	Blyth, Northumberland	United Kingdom	For Royal Navy.
20 April	Heartsease	Flower-class corvette	Harland & Wolff	Belfast	United Kingdom	For Royal Navy
22 April	Anenome	Flower-class corvette	Blyth Dry Docks & Shipbuilding Co. Ltd	Blyth, Northumberland	United Kingdom	For Royal Navy.
22 April	Quantock	Hunt-class destroyer	Scotts	Greenock	United Kingdom	
22 April	Lightning	L-class destroyer	Hawthorn Leslie	Newcastle	United Kingdom	
23 April	Hindustan	Cargo ship	Short Brothers Ltd.	Sunderland	United Kingdom	For Hindustan Steam Shipping Co. Ltd.
23 April	Port Napier	Cargo ship	Swan, Hunter & Wigham Richardson Ltd.	Newcastle upon Tyne	United Kingdom	For Port Line. Requisitioned by the Admiralty and completed as the minelayer HMS Port Napier.
23 April	Putney Hill	Cargo ship	William Doxford & Sons Ltd.	Pallion	United Kingdom	For Putney Hill Steamship Co Ltd.
24 April	Sea Fisher	C-type coaster	S. P. Austin & Sons Ltd.	Sunderland	United Kingdom	For Fenwick, Fisher Steamship Co.
23 April	Welsh Prince	Cargo ship	Blythswood Shipbuilding Co. Ltd.	Glasgow	United Kingdom	For Prince Line Ltd.
24 April	Cleveland	Hunt-class destroyer	Yarrow	Glasgow	United Kingdom	
24 April	City of Calcutta	Cargo liner	Cammell Laird & Co. Ltd.	Birkenhead	United Kingdom	For Ellerman Lines Ltd.
27 April	Lincoln Castle	Paddle steamer	A. & J. Inglis Ltd.	Glasgow	United Kingdom	For London & North Eastern Railway.
29 April	Cape Wrath	Cargo ship	Lithgows Ltd.	Port Glasgow	United Kingdom	For Cape of Good Hope Motorship Co. Ltd.
29 April	Trevily	Cargo ship	Lithgows Ltd.	Port Glasgow	United Kingdom	For Hain Steamship Co.
April	SK-128	Tank barge	Alabama Drydock and Shipbuilding Company	Mobile, Alabama	United States	For Southern Kraft Corporation.
April	SK-129	Tank barge	Alabama Drydock and Shipbuilding Company	Mobile, Alabama	United States	For Southern Kraft Corporation.
4 May	Camellia	Flower-class corvette	Harland & Wolff	Belfast	United Kingdom	For Royal Navy.
7 May	Morialta	Cargo ship	Caledon Shipbuilding & Engineering Co. Ltd.	Dundee	United Kingdom	For Adelaide Steamship Co.
7 May	Nerissa	N-class destroyer	John Brown and Company	Clydebank	United Kingdom	To Poland as Piorun 1940, returned as HMS Noble 1946, sold for scrap in 1955
7 May	Wandby	Cargo ship	Sir James Laing & Sons Ltd.	Sunderland	United Kingdom	For Ropner Shipping Co. Ltd.
8 May	Cape Breton	Cargo ship	William Gray & Co. Ltd.	West Hartlepool	United Kingdom	For Bowring Steamship Co. Ltd.
9 May	Fiddown	Coaster	Goole Shipbuilding & Repairing Co. Ltd.	Goole	United Kingdom	For S. Morris Ltd.
9 May	Quentin	Icemaid type collier	Grangemouth Dockyard Co. Ltd.	Grangemouth	United Kingdom	For G. Gibson & Co. Ltd.
18 May	Rookley	Cargo ship	William Doxford & Sons Ltd.	Pallion	United Kingdom	For Thomasson Shipping Co. Ltd.
21 May	Cape Hawke	Cargo ship	Lithgows Ltd.	Port Glasgow	United Kingdom	For Cape York Motorship Co. Ltd.
21 May	Havildar	Cargo ship	Lithgows Ltd.	Port Glasgow	United Kingdom	For Asiatic Steam Navigation Co. Ltd.
21 May	Itola	Cargo ship	William Gray & Co. Ltd.	West Hartlepool	United Kingdom	For British India Steam Navigation Co. Ltd.
21 May	Pardo	Refrigerated cargo ship	Harland & Wolff	Belfast	United Kingdom	For Royal Mail Line.
22 May	Mallow	Flower-class corvette	Harland & Wolff	Belfast	United Kingdom	For Royal Navy.
22 May	Napier	N-class destroyer	Fairfield	Govan	United Kingdom	For Royal Australian Navy
22 May	Stanmore	Cargo ship	William Pickersgill & Co. Ltd.	Southwick	United Kingdom	For Stanhope Steamship Co. Ltd.
23 May	Bangor	Bangor-class minesweeper	Harland & Wolff	Govan	United Kingdom	For Royal Navy.
23 May	Burnside	Cargo ship	Barclay, Curle & Co. Ltd.	Glasgow	United Kingdom	For Burns, Philip & Co.
23 May	Coreopsis	Flower-class corvette	Harland & Wolff	Belfast	United Kingdom	For Royal Navy.
23 May	Foremost 97	Tug	Scott & Sons Ltd.	Bowling	United Kingdom	Completed as Cardiff for Great Western Railway.
23 May	St. Essylt	Cargo ship	J. L. Thompson & Sons Ltd.	Sunderland	United Kingdom	For South American Saint Line Ltd.
23 May	Tudor Prince	Cargo ship	Smith's Dock Co. Ltd.	Middlesbrough	United Kingdom	For Prince Line Ltd.
May	Assurance	Assurance-class tug	Cochrane & Sons Ltd.	Selby	United Kingdom	For the Admiralty.
May	SK-130	Tank barge	Alabama Drydock and Shipbuilding Company	Mobile, Alabama	United States	For Southern Kraft Corporation.
1 June	Washington	North Carolina-class battleship	Philadelphia Navy Yard	Philadelphia, Pennsylvania	United States	
4 June	Novelist	Cargo ship	Harland & Wolff	Belfast	United Kingdom	For T. & J. Harrison.
4 June	Peony	Flower-class corvette	Harland & Wolff	Belfast	United Kingdom	For Royal Navy.
5 June	Arbutus	flower-class corvette	Blyth Dry Docks & Shipbuilding Co. Ltd	Blyth, Northumberland	United Kingdom	For Royal Navy.
5 June	Dunbar	Bar-class boom defence vessel	Blyth Dry Docks & Shipbuilding Co. Ltd	Blyth, Northumberland	United Kingdom	For Royal Navy.
5 June	Tynedale	Hunt-class destroyer	Alexander Stephens and Sons	Glasgow	United Kingdom	
6 June	Araybank	Cargo ship	Harland & Wolff	Belfast	United Kingdom	For Bank Line.
7 June	Meynell	Hunt-class destroyer	Swan Hunter	Wallsend	United Kingdom	
9 June	Roma	Littorio-class battleship	Cantieri Riuniti dell'Adriatico	Trieste	Italy	For Regia Marina
10 June	Channel Queen	Cargo ship	Burntisland Shipbuilding Company	Burntisland	United Kingdom	For British Channel Islands Shipping Co. Ltd.
13 June	North Carolina	North Carolina-class battleship	New York Naval Shipyard	Brooklyn, New York	United States	
17 June	Eceabat	Ferry	Swan, Hunter & Wigham Richardson Ltd.	Newcastle upon Tyne	United Kingdom	For Turkish Government.
18 June	Erica	Flower-class corvette	Harland & Wolff	Belfast	United Kingdom	For Royal Navy.
18 June	Empire Song	Cargo liner	Greenock Dockyard Co. Ltd.	Greenock	United Kingdom	For Ministry of War Transport.
18 June	Thursobank	Cargo ship	John Readhead & Sons Ltd.	South Shields	United Kingdom	For Bank Line.
20 June	Benalbanach	Cargo ship	Charles Connell & Co Ltd	Glasgow	United Kingdom	For Ben Line.
20 June	Defoe	Cargo ship	Harland & Wolff	Belfast	United Kingdom	For Lamport & Holt.
20 June	Eastgate	Cargo ship	Burntisland Shipbuilding Company	Burntisland	United Kingdom	For Turnbull, Scott & Co. Ltd.
21 June	Charlton Hall	Cargo ship	Sir James Laing & Sons Ltd.	Sunderland	United Kingdom	For C. G. Dunn Shipping Co. Ltd.
22 June	Tower Grange	Cargo ship	William Doxford & Sons Ltd.	Pallion	United Kingdom	For Tower Steamship Co. Ltd.
24 June	Hazelside	Cargo ship	Short Brothers Ltd.	Sunderland	United Kingdom	For Charlton Steam Shipping Co. Ltd.
24 June	Lulworth Hill	Cargo ship	William Hamilton & Co. Ltd.	Port Glasgow	United Kingdom	For Dorset Steamship Co. Ltd.
25 June	Cape Rodney	Cargo ship	Lithgows Ltd.	Port Glasgow	United Kingdom	For Cape of Good Hope Motorship Co. Ltd.
26 June	Crocus	Flower-class corvette	Harland & Wolff	Govan	United Kingdom	For Royal Navy.
26 June	Risaldar	Cargo ship	Lithgows Ltd.	Port Glasgow	United Kingdom	For Asiatic Steam Navigation Co. Ltd.
27 June	Coral Queen	Cargo ship	Burntisland Shipbuilding Company	Burntisland	United Kingdom	For British Channel Traders Ltd.
June	SK-131	Tank barge	Alabama Drydock and Shipbuilding Company	Mobile, Alabama	United States	For Southern Kraft Corporation.
2 July	Gloxinia	Flower-class corvette	Harland & Wolff	Belfast	United Kingdom	For Royal Navy.
4 July	Blackpool	Bangor-class minesweeper	Harland & Wolff	Belfast	United Kingdom	For Royal Navy.
4 July	Nizam	N-class destroyer	John Brown and Company	Clydebank	United Kingdom	For Royal Australian Navy
5 July	Empire Light	Cargo ship	Barclay, Curle & Co. Ltd.	Glasgow	United Kingdom	For Ministry of Shipping.
5 July	Southdown	Hunt-class destroyer	J. Samuel White	Cowes	United Kingdom	
6 July	Itaura	Cargo ship	William Gray & Co. Ltd.	West Hartlepool	United Kingdom	For British India Steam Navigation Co. Ltd.
6 July	Moray Coast	Coaster	Ardrossan Dockyard Ltd.	Ardrossan	United Kingdom	For Coast Lines Ltd.
8 July	Gurkha	L-class destroyer	Cammel Laird	Birkenhead	United Kingdom	
9 July	Duke of Sparta	Cargo ship	William Gray & Co. Ltd.	West Hartlepool	United Kingdom	ForTrent Maritime Co. Ltd.
9 July	Empire Wind	Cargo ship	J.L. Thompson and Sons Ltd.	Sunderland	United Kingdom	For Ministry of Shipping.
9 July	Nestor	N-class destroyer	Fairfield	Govan	United Kingdom	For Royal Australian Navy
10 July	Richmond Hill	Cargo ship	Bartram & Sons Ltd	Sunderland	United Kingdom	For Putney Hill Steamship Co. Ltd.
16 July	Whaddon	Hunt-class destroyer	Alexander Stephens and Sons	Glasgow	United Kingdom	
18 July	Cotswold	Hunt-class destroyer	Yarrow	Glasgow	United Kingdom	
18 July	Duke of Athens	Cargo ship	William Doxford & Sons Ltd.	Pallion	United Kingdom	For Trent Maritime Co. Ltd.
19 July	Silenus	Tanker	Caledon Shipbuilding & Engineering Co. Ltd.	Dundee	United Kingdom	For Axel Johnson. Completed as Athelvictor for Tankers Ltd.
20 July	Shirrabank	Cargo ship	Harland & Wolff	Belfast	United Kingdom	For Bank Line.
23 July	Ardenvohr	Cargo ship	William Denny and Brothers Ltd.	Dumbarton	United Kingdom	For Australind Steam Shipping Co. Ltd.
29 July	Falke	Bussard-class seaplane tender	Schichau	Königsberg	Germany	For the Luftwaffe
31 July	Rumba	Dance-class trawler	Harland & Wolff	Govan	United Kingdom	For Royal Navy.
July	Aircrest	Cargo ship	Lithgows Ltd.	Port Glasgow	United Kingdom	For Crest Shipping Co. Ltd.
1 August	Bathurst	Bathurst-class corvette	Cockatoo Island Dockyard	Sydney	Australia	
3 August	Cornwood	C-type coaster	S. P. Austin & Sons Ltd.	Sunderland	United Kingdom	For Wm. France, Fenwick & Co. Ltd.
5 August	Avonda	Cargo ship	Swan, Hunter & Wigham Richardson Ltd.	Newcastle upon Tyne	United Kingdom	For British India Steam Navigation Co. Ltd.
5 August	Erne	Black Swan-class sloop		Barrow-in-Furness	United Kingdom	
6 August	Blencathra	Hunt-class destroyer	Cammel Laird	Birkenhead	United Kingdom	
6 August	Dalhousie	Cargo ship	Burntisland Shipbuilding Company	Burntisland	United Kingdom	For Dalhousie Steam & Motorship Co. Ltd.
6 August	Empire Thunder	Cargo ship	William Pickersgill & Co. Ltd.	Southwick	United Kingdom	For Ministry of Shipping.
6 August	Fultata	Cargo ship	William Doxford & Sons Ltd.	Pallion	United Kingdom	For British India Steam Navigation Co. Ltd.
6 August	Gentian	Flower-class corvette	Harland & Wolff	Belfast	United Kingdom	For Royal Navy.
8 August	Serenity	Coastal tanker	G. Brown & Co (Marine) Ltd.	Greenock	United Kingdom	For F. T. Everard & Sons Ltd.
10 August	Lismore	Bathurst-class corvette	Mort's Dock and Engineering Co	Sydney	Australia	
15 August	Ranger	Tug	Hong Kong & Whampoa Dock Co. Ltd.	Hong Kong	Hong Kong	For Luzon Stevedoring Co.
15 August	Tudor Prince	Cargo ship	Smith's Dock Co. Ltd.	Middlesbrough	United Kingdom	For Prince Line Ltd.
19 August	Empire Bronze	Ocean type tanker	R & W Hawthorn, Leslie & Co Ltd	Newcastle upon Tyne	United Kingdom	For Ministry of Shipping.
19 August	Fishpool	Cargo ship	Sir James Laing & Sons Ltd.	Sunderland	United Kingdom	For Pool Shipping Co. Ltd.
19 August	Hyacinth	Flower-class corvette	Harland & Wolff	Belfast	United Kingdom	For Royal Navy.
19 August	Liddesdale	Hunt-class destroyer	Vickers-Armstrongs	Newcastle upon Tyne	United Kingdom	
29 August	Empire Bay	Collier	William Gray & Co. Ltd.	West Hartlepool	United Kingdom	For Ministry of Shipping.
20 August	Eridge	Hunt-class destroyer	Swan Hunter	Tyne and Wear	United Kingdom	
22 August	Black Ranger	Tanker	Harland & Wolff	Belfast	United Kingdom	For Royal Fleet Auxiliary.
22 August	Ruotsinsalmi	Minelayer	Wärtsilä Crichton-Vulcan	Turku	Finland	For Finnish Navy
24 August	Reaveley	Cargo ship	William Doxford & Sons Ltd.	Pallion	United Kingdom	For Stephens, Sutton Ltd.
24 August	Vaterland	passenger ship	Blohm & Voss	Hamburg	Germany	For HAPAG
26 August	Coulbeg	Cargo ship	Lithgows Ltd.	Port Glasgow	United Kingdom	For Dornoch Shipping Co. Ltd.
29 August	Sarabande	Dance-class trawler	Harland & Wolff	Govan	United Kingdom	For Royal Navy.
30 August	Rembrandt	Cargo ship	Lithgows Ltd.	Port Glasgow	United Kingdom	For Bolton Steam Shipping Co. Ltd.
2 September	Blyth	Bangor-class minesweeper	Blyth Dry Docks & Shipbuilding Co. Ltd	Blyth, Northumberland	United Kingdom	For Royal Navy.
2 September	Empire Frost	Cargo ship	Lithgows	Greenock	United Kingdom	For Ministry of Shipping
2 September	Hans Albrecht Wedel	Hans Albrecht Wedel-class light seaplane tender	Schichau	Königsberg	Germany	For the Luftwaffe
2 September	HMS Rhododendron	Flower-class corvette	Harland & Wolff	Belfast	United Kingdom	For Royal Navy.
3 September	Edencrag	Cargo ship	Burntisland Shipbuilding Company	Burntisland	United Kingdom	For Hartlepools Steamship Co.
3 September	Empire Meteor	Cargo ship	J.L. Thompson and Sons Ltd.	Sunderland	United Kingdom	For Ministry of Shipping.
3 September	Empire Voice	Cargo ship	Barclay, Curle & Co. Ltd.	Glasgow	United Kingdom	For Ministry of Shipping.
3 September	Fanad Head	Cargo ship	Harland & Wolff	Belfast	United Kingdom	For Ulster Steamship Co.
3 September	Ismalia	Cargo ship	William Gray & Co. Ltd.	West Hartlepool	United Kingdom	For British India Steam Navigation Co. Ltd.
4 September	Atlantic City	Cargo ship	William Doxford & Sons Ltd.	Pallion	United Kingdom	For Leeds Shipping Co. Ltd.
4 September	Empire Lightning	Cargo ship	Short Brothers Ltd.	Sunderland	United Kingdom	For Ministry of War Transport.
4 September	Potaro	Refrigerated cargo ship	Harland & Wolff	Belfast	United Kingdom	For Royal Mail Line.
5 September	Cottesmore	Hunt-class destroyer	Yarrow	Glasgow	United Kingdom	
15 September	Celia	Shakespearian-class trawler	Cochrane & Sons	Selby	United Kingdom	For Royal Navy
16 September	Durward	Icemaid type collier	Grangemouth Dockyard Co. Ltd.	Grangemouth	United Kingdom	For G. Gibson & Co. Ltd.
16 September	North Briton	Cargo ship	John Readhead & Sons Ltd.	South Shields	United Kingdom	For North Shipping Co. Ltd.
17 September	Heather	Flower-class corvette	Harland & Wolff	Belfast	United Kingdom	For Royal Navy.
17 September	Twickenham	Cargo ship	Caledon Shipbuilding & Engineering Co. Ltd.	Dundee	United Kingdom	For Britain Steamship Co.
30 September	Brocklesby	Hunt-class destroyer	Cammel Laird	Birkenhead	United Kingdom	
30 September	Farndale	Hunt-class destroyer	Swan Hunter	Wallsend	United Kingdom	
1 October	Clan Brodie	Cargo ship	Greenock Dockyard Co. Ltd.	Greenock	United Kingdom	For Clan Line Steamers Ltd. Requisition by the Admiralty, completed as HMS Athene.
1 October	Empire Lough	Collier	William Gray & Co. Ltd.	West Hartlepool	United Kingdom	For Ministry of Shipping.
1 October	Sutlej	Black Swan-class sloop	William Denny and Brothers		United Kingdom	
2 October	Jupiter	Sans Souci-class light seaplane tender	Ch. de St. Nazaire Penhoet	Saint-Nazaire	France	Former French Sans Souci
3 October	Empire Breeze	Cargo ship	J. L. Thompson & Sons Ltd.	Sunderland	United Kingdom	For Ministry of Shipping
3 October	Freesia	Flower-class corvette	Harland & Wolff	Belfast	United Kingdom	For Royal Navy.
3 October	Stanford	Cargo ship	William Pickersgill & Co. Ltd.	Southwick	United Kingdom	For Stanhope Steamship Co. Ltd.
4 October	Empire Gold	Dale-class oiler	Furness Shipbuilding Co. Ltd.	Haverton-Hill-on-Tees	United Kingdom	For Ministry of Shipping.
4 October	Pentridge Hill	Cargo ship	Bartram & Sons Ltd	Sunderland	United Kingdom	For Putney Hill Steamship Co. Ltd.
15 October	Eastern City	Cargo ship	William Doxford & Sons Ltd.	Pallion	United Kingdom	For Leeds Shipping Co. Ltd.
15 October	Orchis	Flower-class corvette	Harland & Wolff	Belfast	United Kingdom	For Royal Navy.
16 October	Barmill	Bar-class boom defence vessel	Blyth Dry Docks & Shipbuilding Co. Ltd	Blyth, Northumberland	United Kingdom	For Royal Navy.
16 October	Empire Cliff	Coaster	Goole Shipbuilding & Repairing Co. Ltd.	Goole	United Kingdom	For Ministry of Shipping.
17 October	Kingston Hill	Cargo ship	William Hamilton & Co. Ltd.	Port Glasgow	United Kingdom	For Putney Hill Steamship Co. Ltd.
18 October	Trader	Cargo ship	Charles Connell & Co Ltd	Glasgow	United Kingdom	For T. & J. Harrison.
19 October	Empire Silver	Dale-class oiler	Blythswood Shipbuilding Co. Ltd.	Glasgow	United Kingdom	For Ministry of Shipping. Completed as RFA Denbydale for Royal Fleet Auxiliary.
20 October	Heythrop	Hunt-class destroyer	Swan Hunter	Tyne and Wear	United Kingdom	
23 October	Avon Vale	Hunt-class destroyer	John Brown and Company	Clydebank	United Kingdom	
25 October	Burnie	Bathurst-class corvette	Mort's Dock and Engineering Co	Sydney	Australia	
29 October	Empire Mist	Cargo ship	William Doxford & Sons Ltd.	Pallion	United Kingdom	For Ministry of Shipping.
30 October	Empire Rain	Cargo ship	John Readhead & Sons Ltd.	South Shields	United Kingdom	For Ministry of Shipping.
30 October	Goodwood	C-type coaster	S. P. Austin & Sons Ltd.	Sunderland	United Kingdom	For Wm. France, Fenwick & Co. Ltd.
30 October	Marne	M-class destroyer	Vickers-Armstrong	Walker, Newcastle	United Kingdom	Transferred to Turkey 1959 as Maresal Fevzi Cakmak
30 October	Merkur	Sans Souci-class light seaplane tender	Ch. de St. Nazaire Penhoet	Saint-Nazaire	France	Former French Sans Peur
30 October	Norman	N-class destroyer	John I. Thornycroft & Company	Southampton	United Kingdom	For Royal Australian Navy
30 October	Oakley	Hunt-class destroyer	Vickers-Armstrong	River Tyne	United Kingdom	To the Polish Navy as Kujawiak in 1941
30 October	Saturn	Sans Souci-class light seaplane tender	Ch. de St. Nazaire Penhoet	Saint-Nazaire	France	Former French Sans Reproche
30 October	Suncrest	Cargo ship	Burntisland Shipbuilding Company	Burntisland	United Kingdom	For Crest Shipping Co.
30 October	Uranus	Sans Souci-class light seaplane tender	Ch. de St. Nazaire Penhoet	Saint-Nazaire	France	Former French Sans Pareil
31 October	Peterhead	Bangor-class minesweeper	Blyth Dry Docks & Shipbuilding Co. Ltd	Blyth, Northumberland	United Kingdom	For Royal Navy.
31 October	Empire Strait	Collier	William Gray & Co. Ltd.	West Hartlepool	United Kingdom	For Ministry of Shipping.
31 October	Kingcup	Flower-class corvette	Harland & Wolff	Belfast	United Kingdom	For Royal Navy.
31 October	Newbrough	Cargo ship	Short Brothers Ltd.	Sunderland	United Kingdom	For Northumbrian Shipping Co. Ltd.
31 October	Spiraea	Flower-class corvette	Harland & Wolff	Govan	United Kingdom	For Royal Navy.
October	Lapseki	Ferry	Swan, Hunter & Wigham Richardson Ltd.	Newcastle upon Tyne	United Kingdom	For Turkish Government.
1 November	Antar	Cargo ship	William Doxford & Sons Ltd.	Pallion	United Kingdom	For New Egypt & Levant Shipping Co. Ltd.
2 November	Pampas	Refrigerated cargo ship	Harland & Wolff	Belfast	United Kingdom	For Royal Mail Line.
4 November	Lookout	L-class destroyer	Scotts Shipbuilding & Engineering	Greenock	United Kingdom	
13 November	Empire Deep	Coaster	A & J Inglis Ltd	Glasgow	United Kingdom	For Ministry of Shipping
13 November	Empire Gat	Coaster	A & J Inglis Ltd	Glasgow	United Kingdom	For Ministry of Shipping.
13 November	Empire Sunrise	Cargo ship	J.L. Thompson and Sons Ltd.	Sunderland	United Kingdom	For Ministry of Shipping.
13 November	Stuart Queen	Coaster	Ardrossan Dockyard Ltd.	Ardrossan	United Kingdom	For British Channel Islands Shipping Co. Ltd.
14 November	Murefte	Ferry	Swan, Hunter & Wigham Richardson Ltd.	Newcastle upon Tyne	United Kingdom	For Turkish Government.
15 November	Empire Oil	Dale-class oiler	Blythswood Shipbuilding	Scotstoun	United Kingdom	For the Ministry of Shipping. Completed as RFA Darkdale for Royal Fleet Auxiliary.
15 November	Empire Trust	Cargo liner	Barclay, Curle & Co. Ltd.	Glasgow	United Kingdom	For .
16 November	Bryony	Flower-class corvette	Harland & Wolff	Belfast	United Kingdom	For Royal Navy.
16 November	Goulburn	Bathurst-class corvette	Cockatoo Island Dockyard	Sydney	Australia	
16 November	Jumna	Black Swan-class sloop	William Denny and Brothers		United Kingdom	
16 November	Pimpernel	Flower-class corvette	Harland & Wolff	Belfast	United Kingdom	For Royal Navy.
20 November	Erdek	Ferry	Swan, Hunter & Wigham Richardson Ltd.	Newcastle upon Tyne	United Kingdom	For Turkish Government.
21 November	Empire Comet	Cargo ship	Lithgows Ltd	Port Glasgow	United Kingdom	For Ministry of Shipping
21 November	Empire Dew	Cargo ship	Lithgows Ltd	Port Glasgow	United Kingdom	For Ministry of Shipping
27 November	Rio Hudson	C3 merchant freighter	Sun Shipbuilding	Chester, Pennsylvania	United States	Converted to escort carrier HMS Avenger in 1942
28 November	Abelia	Flower-class corvette	Harland & Wolff	Belfast	United Kingdom	For Royal Navy.
28 November	Empire Silver	Norwegian type tanker	Sir J. Laing & Sons Ltd.	Sunderland	United Kingdom	For Ministry of Shipping.
28 November	Ibis	Black Swan-class sloop	Furness Shipbuilding Co. Ltd		United Kingdom	
28 November	Lance	L-class destroyer	Yarrow Shipbuilders	Scotstoun	United Kingdom	
28 November	Nasprite	Sprite-class tanker	Blythswood Shipbuilding Co. Ltd.	Glasgow	United Kingdom	For Royal Fleet Auxiliary.
29 November	Empire Granite	Dale-class oiler	R. & W Hawthorn, Leslie & Co. Ltd.	Newcastle upon Tyne	United Kingdom	For Ministry of Shipping. Completed as RFA Echodale for Royal Fleet Auxiliary.
29 November	Sarkoy	Ferry	Swan, Hunter & Wigham Richardson Ltd.	Newcastle upon Tyne	United Kingdom	For Turkish Government. Requisitioned by Royal Navy.
30 November	Adamant	Submarine depot ship	Harland & Wolff	Belfast	United Kingdom	For Royal Navy.
30 November	Ikauna	Cargo ship	William Gray & Co. Ltd.	West Hartlepool	United Kingdom	For British India Steam Navigation Co. Ltd.
November	Mudanya	Ferry	Swan, Hunter & Wigham Richardson Ltd.	Newcastle upon Tyne	United Kingdom	For Turkish Government.
2 December	Empire Foreland	Coaster	Goole Shipbuilding & Repairing Co. Ltd.	Goole	United Kingdom	For Ministry of Shipping.
2 December	Empire Stream	Ore carrier	Lithgows Ltd.	Port Glasgow	United Kingdom	For Ministry of Shipping.
4 December	Empire Steel	Ocean type tanker	Cammell Laird & Co. Ltd.	Birkenhead	United Kingdom	For Ministry of Shipping.
4 December	Silverton	Hunt-class destroyer	J. Samuel White	Cowes	United Kingdom	To the Polish Navy as Krakowiak in 1941
9 December	TLC 11	Tank Landing Craft	Harland & Wolff	Belfast	United Kingdom	For Royal Navy.
9 December	TLC 12	Tank Landing Craft	Harland & Wolff	Belfast	United Kingdom	For Royal Navy.
10 December	Ballarat	Bathurst-class corvette	Williamstown Naval Dockyard	Williamstown	Australia	
10 December	Robin Doncaster	Type C2-S cargo ship	Bethlehem Steel	Sparrows Point, Maryland	United States	Built for Robin Line, but requisitioned on completion and delivered to Ministry of Shipping as Empire Curlew.
12 December	Brown Ranger	Tanker	Harland & Wolff	Belfast	United Kingdom	For Royal Fleet Auxiliary.
12 December	Empire Granite	Ocean type tanker	Furness Shipbuilding Co. Ltd.	Haverton-Hill-on-Tees	United Kingdom	For Ministry of Shipping.
12 December	Martin	M-class destroyer	Vickers-Armstrong	Walker, Newcastle	United Kingdom	
12 December	Pandorian	Cargo ship	Swan, Hunter & Wigham Richardson Ltd.	Wallsend	United Kingdom	For Ellerman & Papyanni Lines.
14 December	Elmdale	Cargo ship	Burntisland Shipbuilding Company	Burntisland	United Kingdom	For Morrison Steamship Co.
14 December	Empire Dawn	Cargo ship	William Doxford & Sons	Sunderland	United Kingdom	For Ministry of Shipping
14 December	Lamerton	Hunt-class destroyer	Swan Hunter	Tyne and Wear	United Kingdom	Sold to Indian Navy; commissioned as INS Gomati (D93) in 1953
14 December	Hornet	Yorktown-class aircraft carrier	Newport News Shipbuilding	Newport News, Virginia	United States	
15 December	Empire Moon	Cargo ship	J.L. Thompson and Sons Ltd.	Sunderland	United Kingdom	For Ministry of Shipping.
s16 December	Empire Knolll	Collier	William Gray & Co. Ltd.	West Hartlepool	United Kingdom	For Ministry of Shipping.
16 December	Empire Snow	Cargo ship	C. Connell & Co. Ltd.	Glasgow	United Kingdom	For Ministry of Shipping.
17 December	Alisma	Flower-class corvette	Harland & Wolff	Belfast	United Kingdom	For Royal Navy.
18 December	Rio Parana	C3 merchant freighter	Sun Shipbuilding	Chester, Pennsylvania	United States	Converted to escort carrier HMS Biter in 1942
19 December	Blankney	Hunt-class destroyer	John Brown and Company	Clydebank	United Kingdom	
27 December	Empire Cloud	Cargo ship	William Pickersgill & Sons Ltd	Sunderland	United Kingdom	For Ministry of Shipping
27 December	Empire Hail	Cargo ship	Lithgows Ltd.	Port Glasgow	United Kingdom	For Ministry of Shipping.
27 December	Empire Rainbow	Cargo ship	Greenock Dockyard Co. Ltd.	Greenock	United Kingdom	For Ministry of Shipping
27 December	Empire Summer	Cargo ship	Short Brothers Ltd.	Sunderland	United Kingdom	For Ministry of Shipping.
28 December	Daltonhall	Cargo ship	William Doxford & Sons Ltd.	Pallion	United Kingdom	For West Hartlepool Steam Navigation Co. Ltd.
31 December	Tudor Queen	Cargo ship	Burntisland Shipbuilding Company	Burntisland	United Kingdom	For British Channel Islands Shipping Co. Ltd.
December	Hinsang	Cargo ship	Hong Kong & Whampoa Dock Co. Ltd.	Hong Kong	Hong Kong	For Indo-China Steam Navigation Co. Ltd.
December	Pakhoi	Cargo ship	Taikoo Dockyard & Engineering Company of Hong Kong Ltd.	Hong Kong	Hong Kong	For China Navigation Co. Ltd.
Unknown date	Anna	Tanker			Germany	For Kriegsmarine.
Unknown date	Bishops Pointer	Lighter	W. J. Yarwood & Sons Ltd.	Northwich	United Kingdom	For Liverpool Lighterage Co. Ltd. and/or Bishops Wharf Carrying Co. Ltd.
Unknown date	Caribe II	Cargo ship	Van Diepen Scheepswerf Gebroeders NV	Waterhuizen	Netherlands	For S G Hallstrom, Amsterdam.
Unknown date	Dora	Tanker	D. W. Kremer Sohn	Elmshorn	Germany	For Kriegsmarine.
Unknown date	Else	coastal Tanker	D W Kremer Sohn	Elmshorn	Germany	For Kriegsmarine.
Unknown date	Friedrich Bischoff	Cargo ship	Lübecker Maschinenbau Gesellschaft	Lübeck	Germany	For Argo Reederei Richard Adler & Co
Unknown date	Gemlik	Ferry	Swan, Hunter & Wigham Richardson Ltd.	Newcastle upon Tyne	United Kingdom	For Turkish Government.
Unknown date	Henning Maersk	Tanker	Nakskov Skibs. Akt.	Nakskov	Denmark	For A. P. Moller.
Unknown date	Jeverland	Tanker	Howaltswerke.	Kiel	Germany	Requisitioned by Kriegsmarine on completion.
Unknown date	Justinian	Cargo ship	Nobiskrug Werft	Rendsburg	Germany	For Hilmar Reksten, Bergen, Norway. Seized on completion in May 1942
Unknown date	Karl Meyer	Karl Meyer-class seaplane tender	Norderwerft Koser und Meyer	Hamburg	Germany	For the Luftwaffe
Unknown date	Kilye	Ferry	Swan, Hunter & Wigham Richardson Ltd.	Newcastle upon Tyne	United Kingdom	For Turkish Government.
Unknown date	Max Stinsky	Karl Meyer-class seaplane tender	Norderwerft Koser und Meyer	Hamburg	Germany	For the Luftwaffe
Unknown date	Meads	Tug	Richard Dunston Ltd.	Thorne	United Kingdom	For River Lighterage Co. Ltd.
Unknown date	Otavi	Cargo ship	Kockums Mekaniska Verkstad.	Malmö	Sweden	Completed in 1946 as El Gaucho for Societe Anonyme Comercial de Exportación y Importación y Financiera.
Unknown date	Papendrecht	Tanker	Rotterdamsche Droogdock Maatschappij	Rotterdam	Netherlands	For NV Phs. van Ommeren's Scheepsvaartbedrijf.
Unknown date	Redeemer	Salvage vessel	Rowhedge Ironworks Co. Ltd.	Rowhedge	United Kingdom	For Admiralty.
Unknown date	Springfjord	Cargo ship	Trondheims Mekaniske Verkstad.	Trondheim	Norway	For Springwell Shipping Co. Ltd. Seized by Germany, completed as Rudesheimer of Hansa Line.
Unknown date	Theodora	Tanker	Burmeister & Wain.	Copenhagen	Denmark	For Compagnie Auxilaire de Navigation. Seized by Germany completed s as Heide for J. T. Essberger.
Unknown date	Vista	Tug	Richard Dunston Ltd.	Thorne	United Kingdom	For Vokins & Co.
