= Empire Oil =

Two ships were named Empire Oil:

- MV Empire Oil, a 8,145 GRT tanker built 1940 by Blythwood Shipbuilding
- SS Empire Oil, a 8,029 GRT tanker built 1941 by Furness Shipbuilding
