= Bishopdale =

Bishopdale may refer to:

== Places ==
=== Australia ===
- Bishopdale, a former missionary settlement established at Balgo, Western Australia in 1939

=== New Zealand ===
- Bishopdale, Christchurch, a suburb of Christchurch, New Zealand
- Bishopdale, Nelson, a suburb of Nelson, New Zealand

=== UK ===
- Bishopdale, North Yorkshire, England, a dale in the Yorkshire Dales National Park

== Other uses ==
- RFA Bishopdale, a ship of the Royal Fleet Auxiliary (1936-1959)
