= RFA Dingledale =

1941 Dale-class fleet tanker of the Royal Fleet Auxiliary

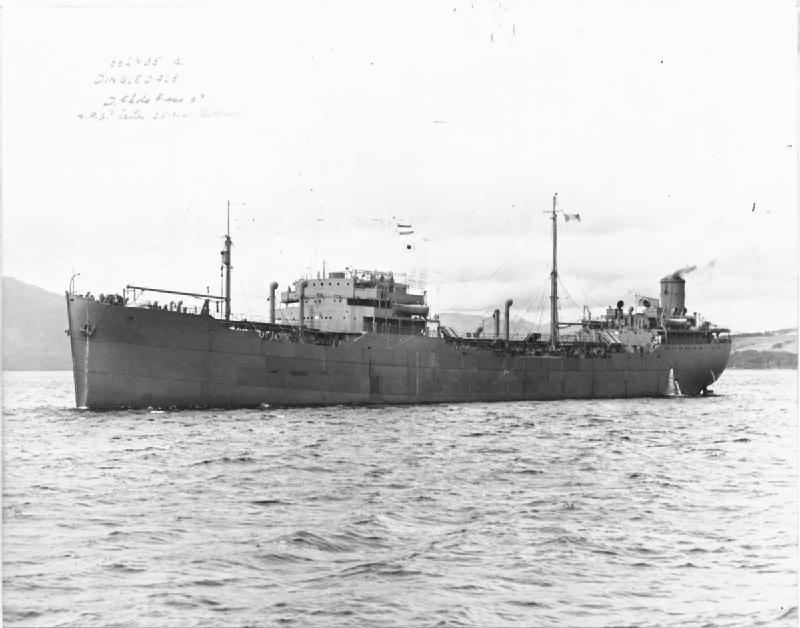

History

United Kingdom
- Name: RFA Dingledale
- Builder: Harland & Wolff, Govan
- Yard number: 1044
- Laid down: 11 December 1939
- Launched: 27 March 1941
- Completed: 10 September 1941
- Commissioned: 10 September 1941
- Decommissioned: 10 May 1959
- Fate: Sold into civilian service on 9 December 1959 as Royaumont; Arrived at Santander for scrapping on 23 January 1967

General characteristics
- Class & type: Dale-class fleet tanker
- Displacement: 16,836 tons full load
- Length: 479 ft 5 in (146.13 m)
- Beam: 61 ft 2 in (18.64 m)
- Draught: 27 ft (8.23 m)
- Propulsion: Burmeister & Wain 8-cylinder diesels with a single shaft 6,800 hp (5,100 kW).
- Speed: 11.5 knots (21.3 km/h)
- Complement: 44

RFA Dingledale (A144) was a Dale-class fleet tanker of the Royal Fleet Auxiliary. She was initially based at Gibraltar, and served as an escort oiler on several Malta Convoys. During Operation Pedestal, together with RFA Brown Ranger, she fuelled one cruiser and 24 destroyers in 14 hours. Narrowly escaping damage during a severe air raid in Bône in December 1942, she survived to join the Pacific Fleet Train, and was present for the Japanese surrender in Tokyo Bay. After the war, she carried out routine freighting duties. She was decommissioned on 10 May 1959, and was laid up at Devonport.
