= RFA Arndale =

1937 Dale-class replenishment oiler for the Royal Fleet Auxiliary

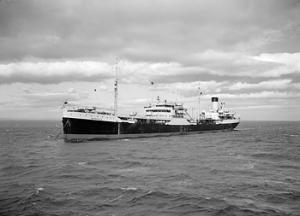

History

United Kingdom
- Name: RFA Arndale
- Ordered: 1936
- Builder: Swan Hunter and Wigham Richardson Ltd, Wallsend
- Laid down: January 1937
- Launched: 5 August 1937
- Commissioned: 28 September 1937
- Decommissioned: 12 August 1959
- Fate: Arrived at Willebroek, Belgium for scrapping on 12 April 1960

General characteristics
- Class & type: Dale-class fleet tanker
- Displacement: 17,210 long tons full load
- Length: 481 ft 7 in (146.79 m)
- Beam: 61 ft 11 in (18.87 m)
- Draught: 27 ft 6 in (8.38 m)
- Propulsion: 1 x 4 cyl Droxford diesel engine with a single shaft. 687 nhp.
- Speed: 11.5 knots (21.3 km/h)
- Complement: 44

RFA Arndale (A133) was a Dale-class fleet tanker of the Royal Fleet Auxiliary, originally one of six ships ordered by the British Tanker Company which were purchased on the stocks by the Admiralty. She was decommissioned on 12 August 1959 and was laid up at Rosyth.

== Career ==
Ordered by the British Tanker Company in 1936, Arndale was built by Swan Hunter and Wigham Richardson Ltd, Wallsend and launched on 5 August 1937. She was taken over by the Admiralty on 28 September 1937 after completing her sea trials, and on 29 September 1937 sailed from the River Tyne bound for Trinidad on her maiden voyage. She went out to the Pacific in 1938, sailing to Auckland, New Zealand via Abadan on the Persian Gulf, before returning to the UK in early 1939. She returned to the Pacific in 1939, and on the outbreak of the Second World War, was travelling back to the UK via the Mediterranean. She arrived at Portsmouth on 31 October, but was involved in a collision with RFA Distol at Gosport Oil Fuel Jetty. In November she sailed to Trinidad, returning to the UK in December via Halifax, Nova Scotia.

After undergoing some repairs on the River Clyde in January 1940, Arndale returned to Trinidad in February, before travelling on to the River Plate and then Port Stanley, Falkland Islands in April. The rest of the year, and into 1941, was spent in the South Atlantic, with calls at Rio de Janeiro and Montevideo, before sailing to Gibraltar in April 1941. Arndale was back in the Caribbean in September 1941, having arrived at Curaçao via Key West and New Orleans. She was once more in service off the South American coastline and in the Caribbean, undergoing repairs at New Orleans from March to April 1942. In May she sailed from Trinidad bound for Cape Town, moving on to Mombasa in July, and then to Durban in November. After a period dry docked between June and July 1943, she sailed to Bandar Abbas in September 1943, she made her way to Trincomalee, via Bombay, Colombo and Addu Atoll. Arndale was active in the Indian Ocean, refuelling British, Australian and US warships, before being assigned to Task Force 67 in Operation Transom, a bombing raid on Japanese targets at Surabaya, Java in April 1944. On 30 May Arndale was involved in a collision, and was by now suffering from engine defects. She underwent repairs at Brisbane in July 1944, but on 28 August 1944 was again involved in a collision, this time with the cruiser HMS Ceylon, during refuelling.

Arndale returned to the Indian Ocean in September, and moved to Australian waters in November. She refuelled warships of the Royal Australian Navy during this period, before being assigned to Force 69 in January 1945, supporting Force 63 for Operation Meridian I on 24 January, and Operation Meridian II on 29 January. Operation Meridian was a two-phase carrier-borne air strike by the British Pacific Fleet against the Japanese oil refineries at Palembang, Sumatra, which supplied approximately a third of Japan's aviation fuel. The strikes on 24 and 29 January 1945 were among the most significant offensive operations conducted by the Royal Navy in the Pacific theatre. Arndale's role as part of Force 69, the logistic support element, was critical to the feasibility of both strikes: the fleet train provided the continuous at-sea replenishment that allowed the carriers to operate far from their nearest base at Fremantle. Operation Meridian I destroyed an estimated 35% of the refinery's output capacity; Operation Meridian II resulted in near-total destruction of the Soengei Gerong refinery. Arndale returned to Australia on 7 February 1945, berthing at Fremantle. In February 1945 she sailed to Manus Island, in the Admiralty Islands, and in March was allocated to Operation Iceberg, the allied invasion of Okinawa. She moved forward to Leyte Gulf in March 1945 with the other auxiliaries and spent the rest of the war attached to the fleet train of the British Pacific Fleet. She was badly damaged by fire in August 1945 and repaired at Brisbane, before visiting Hong Kong in October 1945.

Arndale returned to the UK in March 1946 and underwent a refit at Swan Hunter's yards. Returning to service, she spent her postwar career making regular voyages between the Pacific, Indian Ocean, Caribbean and the UK, supporting fleet operations. On 19 January 1952 she suffered a flooded engine room in heavy weather while in the North Sea off the Scottish coast. She sent out a mayday, and was attended to by the tugs Zest of Invergordon and Hengist of, Rosyth, being towed into Rosyth Dockyard on 21 January 1952. Between July and November 1953 she was refitted at Palmers Yard, Hebburn on Tyne, and between January 1955 and February 1956 she was on charter to London & Overseas Freighters. On 12 August 1959 Arndale was laid up at Rosyth, and on 4 December 1959 she was advertised for sale. She was sold to a Belgian shipbreaking firm in March 1960 and on 12 April 1960 Arndale arrived at Willebroek, Belgium to be scrapped by Sadeica Cie Anonyme. Brussels.
