= RFA Derwentdale (A114) =

1941 Dale-class replenishment oiler for the Royal Fleet Auxiliary

History

United Kingdom
- Name: RFA Derwentdale
- Builder: Harland & Wolff, Govan
- Yard number: 1052
- Laid down: 14 November 1939
- Launched: 12 April 1941
- Completed: 30 August 1941
- Commissioned: 30 August 1941
- Decommissioned: 19 May 1959
- Fate: Sold commercially in December 1959 as Irvingdale 1.; Arrived at Ferrol for scrapping on 23 July 1966

General characteristics
- Class & type: Dale-class fleet tanker
- Displacement: 17,000 tons full load
- Length: 483 ft 4 in (147.32 m)
- Beam: 59 ft 4 in (18.08 m)
- Draught: 27 ft 6.5 in (8.39 m)
- Propulsion: Burmeister & Wain 8-cylinder diesels with a single shaft 6,800 hp (5,100 kW).
- Speed: 11.5 knots (21.3 km/h)
- Complement: 44

RFA Derwentdale (A114) was a Dale-class fleet tanker and landing ship (gantry) of the Royal Fleet Auxiliary. She served during the Second World War.

Built for the Ministry of War Transport, she was taken over by the Admiralty and completed as a Landing Ship Gantry carrying 15 LCMs with accommodation for 150 military personnel. As such, 15 LCMs could be carried on the ships, with two Gantry cranes, one forward of the ship's bridge and one aft, used to lift the landing craft off the deck and lower them to the sea.

== Service ==
Her maiden voyage was as part of convoy ON 19 to Halifax on 22 September 1941. Later Derwentdale took part in the British invasion of Madagascar in 1942, leaving Durban, South Africa on 25 May 1942, and contributing 14 landing craft for the landings at Diego Suarez on 5 May. In November 1942, the British and Americans landed in French North Africa in Operation Torch, with Derwentdale taking part in the landings at Arzew near Oran in Algeria on 9 November. She later took part in the invasions of Sicily and Italy. She was damaged by dive-bombing at Salerno in September 1943 and towed to the UK via Malta. Re-engined with engines from the Denbydale in February 1946, she returned to service as a tanker, her extra accommodation was used for passengers whilst freighting oil on the Trinidad to UK run. She was decommissioned on 19 May 1959 and was laid up at Rosyth, and offered for sale on 20 October. Sold in December 1959 to Kent Line Canada and renamed Irvingdale 1, on 23 July 1966 she was moved to Ferrol, Spain, to be broken up.

Derwentdale was one of the eight RFA ships to be awarded Battle Honours during World War II, and the only to be awarded them three times (North Africa 1942, Sicily 1943 and Salerno 1943).
