= Dale-class oiler =

Class of replenishment oilers for the Royal Fleet Auxiliary

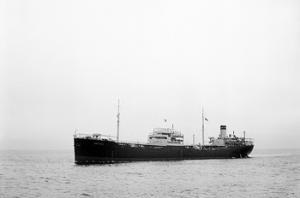
- RFA Abbeydale underway in 1952

Class overview
- Name: Dale class
- Builders: Swan Hunter and Wigham Richardson Ltd; Blythwood Shipbuilding Company Ltd; Cammell Laird; Furness Shipbuilding Company; Harland and Wolff, Govan; Hawthorn Leslie and Company; Lithgows
- Operators: Royal Fleet Auxiliary
- Preceded by: Ol class
- Succeeded by: Sprite class
- Subclasses: 3
- Built: 1936–1941
- In commission: 1937–1969
- Completed: 18
- Lost: 5
- Retired: 13

General characteristics : First group
- Type: Replenishment oiler
- Displacement: Abbeydale and Arndale: 17,210 long tons (17,486 t); Aldersdale: 17,231 long tons (17,508 t); Bishopdale: 17,357 long tons (17,636 t); Boardale and Broomdale: 17,388 long tons (17,667 t)
- Length: Abbeydale, Arndale and Bishopdale: 481 ft (147 m); Aldersdale: 482 ft (147 m); Boardale and Broomdale: 483 ft (147 m)
- Beam: Abbeydale, Arndale and Aldersdale: 62 ft (19 m); Bishopdale: 61 ft (19 m); Boardale and Broomdale: 61 ft 8 in (18.80 m)
- Draught: 27 ft 6 in (8.38 m)
- Propulsion: Abbeydale and Arndale: Droxford Diesel Engines; Bishopdale and Broomdale: Burmeister and Wain Engines
- Speed: 11.5 knots (13.2 mph; 21.3 km/h)
- Range: 880 tons of fuel oil
- Capacity: 11,650 long tons (11,837 t)
- Complement: 40

General characteristics : Second group
- Displacement: 17,000 long tons (17,273 t)
- Length: 483 ft (147 m)
- Beam: 58 ft 6 in (17.83 m)
- Draught: 27 ft 6 in (8.38 m)
- Propulsion: Burmeister & Wain 8-clylinder diesels with a single shaft
- Speed: 13 knots (15 mph; 24 km/h)
- Range: 1000 tons of fuel oil; 75 tons of lubricating oil
- Capacity: 12,000 long tons (12,193 t)
- Complement: 40

General characteristics : Third group (as second group except:)
- Displacement: 17,210 long tons (17,486 t)
- Length: Darkdale, Denbydale, Derwentdale, Dewdale, Ennerdale and Echodale: 483 ft (147 m); Dingledale, Dinsdale, Eaglesdale and Easedale: 479 ft (146 m)
- Beam: Darkdale, Denbydale, Derwentdale, Dewdale, Ennerdale and Echodale: 59 ft 4 in (18.08 m); Dingledale, Dinsdale, Eaglesdale and Easedale: 61 ft 3 in (18.67 m)
- Draught: 27 ft 6 in (8.38 m)
- Propulsion: Darkdale, Denbydale, Derwentdale, Dewdale, Dingledale, Dinsdale and Echodale: Burmeister & Wain eight-cylinder diesels with a single shaft; Eaglesdale, Easedale and Ennerdale: triple-expansion steam engines with one shaft

The Dale class were a class of replenishment oilers taken up for service with the Royal Fleet Auxiliary, supporting the Royal Navy during the inter-war period. They went on to see action during the Second World War and supported British and allied fleet units in Cold War conflicts such as the Korean War.

== Class overview ==
The ships were eventually acquired in three batches. The first consisted of the acquisition of six tankers under construction for the British Tanker Company in 1937. The tankers all had slightly different designs and dimensions, but had a deadweight capacity of 11,650 tons of fuel oil. These initial eight were supplemented with the purchase of two tankers under construction for Royal Dutch Shell in 1938. These two new tankers were slightly larger and faster than their earlier class members. With the outbreak of the Second World War looming the Ministry of War Transport had ordered a number of new tankers to the designs used by the Royal Dutch Shell. Of these, ten were taken over by the Royal Fleet Auxiliary while under construction, and were subsequently incorporated into their Dale class. There were plans to take over an eleventh ship, to be named RFA Eppingdale, but this was not carried out and the vessel was retained by the Ministry of War Transport. All of the ships were named after English dales, and were identified with the suffix '-dale' in their names.

== Group I ==
The first group of six ships were under construction at a variety of yards when they were bought. Swan Hunter and Wigham Richardson Ltd and Harland and Wolff built two each, while Cammell Laird and Co. and Lithgows each produced one. The ships saw active service during the war, in the Arctic, Atlantic and the Far East. Aldersdale was bombed and sunk while sailing as part of Convoy PQ 17 in 1942, while Boardale was wrecked during the operations off Narvik in 1940. Abbeydale was torpedoed in the Mediterranean and broke in half, but was later repaired, Bishopdale was nearly destroyed by a kamikaze attack in the Pacific, and Broomdale was accidentally torpedoed by HMS Severn at Trincomalee in 1944. Those ships that survived the war remained in service with the Royal Fleet Auxiliary, with most being disposed of in the early 1960s. The longest-lived was Bishopdale, which despite being decommissioned in 1959, was not scrapped until 1970.

== Group II ==
The Royal Fleet Auxiliary made two further purchases the following year, when they acquired two tankers being built for Royal Dutch Shell at the yards of Harland and Wolff and the Blythswood Shipbuilding Company Ltd. These were taken into service as Cairndale and Cedardale. Entering service just prior to the outbreak of war, both ships went on to be heavily engaged. Cairndale made numerous voyages from Britain to the African coast before being torpedoed and sunk in the Eastern Atlantic in 1941 by the Italian submarine Guglielmo Marconi. Cedardale saw service in the Far East, and survived the war. She continued in service throughout the 1940s and 1950s, and was scrapped in 1960.

== Group III ==
The third group was the largest of the Dale class. Ten new oilers that had been ordered by the Ministry of War Transport were acquired by the Royal Fleet Auxiliary to expand their capabilities. The first were ready for service in January 1939, with the final ships being completed by mid-1942. As with their earlier sisters, all saw active service in a variety of theatres. U-boats scored several kills among the third group, Darkdale and Dinsdale were both torpedoed and sunk in 1941. Denbydale was badly damaged by Italian frogmen of the Decima Flottiglia MAS in harbour at Gibraltar in 1941, and was written off. She did however continue in service throughout the war as a fuel and accommodation hulk, and was finally towed back to Britain for scrapping in 1955. Three of the ships, Derwentdale, Dewdale and Ennerdale, were completed as Landing Ships (Gantry) and given light anti-aircraft armament. Now capable of deploying 250 troops aboard 15 LCMs, they initially took part in Operation Torch, and went on to see action at later allied amphibious landings in the Mediterranean and Pacific. All three survived the war, though Ennerdale was badly damaged by a magnetic mine in December 1945, and were converted back into oilers. The survivors all continued in service until their increasing obsolescence led to their retirement from service in the late 1950s, with most having scrapped by the early 1960s.

== Ships ==
Name	Pennant	Builder	Laid down	Launched	Completed	Fate
Group I
Abbeydale	A109	Swan Hunter and Wigham Richardson Ltd		28 December 1936	4 March 1937	Scrapped in 1960
Aldersdale	X34	Cammell Laird and Co.	September 1936	7 July 1936	17 September 1937	Sunk on 7 July 1942
Arndale	A133	Swan Hunter and Wigham Richardson Ltd		5 August 1937	September 1937	Scrapped in 1960
Bishopdale	A128	Lithgows		31 March 1937		Scrapped in 1970
Boardale		Harland and Wolff		22 April 1937	7 June 1937	Wrecked on 30 April 1940
Broomdale	A168	Harland and Wolff		2 September 1937	3 November 1937	Scrapped in 1960
Group II
Cairndale	X36	Harland and Wolff		25 October 1938	26 January 1939	Sunk on 30 May 1941
Cedardale	A380	Blythswood Shipbuilding Company Ltd		25 March 1939	25 May 1939	Scrapped in 1960
Group III
Darkdale		Blythswood Shipbuilding Company Ltd	October 1939	30 July 1940	November 1940	Sunk on 22 October 1941
Denbydale		Blythswood Shipbuilding Company Ltd	26 December 1939	19 October 1940	30 January 1941	Scrapped in 1955
Derwentdale	A114	Harland and Wolff	14 November 1939	12 April 1941	30 August 1941	Sold commercially in 1959. Ultimately scrapped in 1966.
Dewdale	A151	Cammell Laird	29 December 1939	17 February 1941	14 June 1941	Scrapped in 1960
Dingledale	A144	Harland & Wolff	11 December 1939	27 March 1941	10 September 1941	Scrapped in 1967
Dinsdale	X106	Harland & Wolff	1939	21 October 1941	11 April 1942	Sunk on 1 June 1942
Eaglesdale	A104	Furness Shipbuilding Company	20 December 1940	18 November 1941	9 January 1942	Scrapped in 1959
Easedale	A105	Furness Shipbuilding Company	15 February 1941	18 December 1941	12 February 1942	Scrapped in 1960
Echodale	A170	Hawthorn Leslie	4 January 1940	29 November 1940	4 March 1941	Scrapped in 1961
Ennerdale	A173	Swan Hunter and Wigham Richardson Ltd		27 January 1941	11 July 1941	Scrapped in 1959

== See also ==
- List of replenishment ships of the Royal Fleet Auxiliary
- List of amphibious warfare ships of the Royal Fleet Auxiliary
