= Operation Isabella =

Nazi German plan to invade Iberia

During World War II, Operation Isabella was a Nazi German plan to be put into effect after the collapse of the Soviet Union to secure bases in Spain and Portugal for the continuation of the strangulation of Great Britain. This concept was laid out by Adolf Hitler in May 1941 but was never executed.

Isabella was an early development version of a smaller-scale invasion plan later called Operation Ilona. Much like the related Operation Felix, the plan called for invasion of mainland Spain, as well as the capture of Portugal, Andorra, Gibraltar, and forward operating bases in the Azores and Cape Verde Islands. However, unlike Felix, Isabella assumed that the Spanish forces would at least be sympathetic to the Axis cause and that the invasion of Spain proper would be started only to help the Spaniards if the Allies invaded the Iberian Peninsula. To secure the southern flank of the operation, the Wehrmacht was also to capture the Vichy French port of Dakar in North Africa. The strategic objective of the operation would be to prevent the British from using convoy routes to and from the Middle East and India, both through the Suez Canal and Gibraltar and around the Cape of Good Hope.

Although the plan was never put into force, General Franz Halder mentions in his diaries that a forward logistics base for the invasion was prepared in Bordeaux.

== See also ==
- Portugal in World War II
- Spain in World War II
