= Operation Felix =

Codename for a proposed German WWII invasion

- Part of the Western Front of the Second World War
- Invasion plans of Nazi Germany and probable routes of British invasion.
- Operational scope: Iberian Peninsula
- Planned: June–August 1940
- Planned by: OKW
- Objective: Capture Gibraltar
- Outcome: Eventual cancellation and diversion of German forces

Operation Felix (German: Unternehmen Felix) was the codename for a proposed German Wehrmacht campaign to cross into Spain and to seize Gibraltar early in the Second World War. The planned operation presupposed the co-operation of the Spanish dictator, Francisco Franco; it did not occur chiefly because of Franco's reluctance to enter the war - partially due to the influence of British intelligence and the previous destruction of the Spanish country in the Spanish Civil War.

== Background ==
Reminiscing about the Spanish Civil War, Republican minister Federica Montseny wrote to historian Burnett Bolloten in 1950 that the government had planned to offer the Canary or the Balearic Islands to Germany in exchange for its neutrality. However, the Largo Caballero government could not provide written proof of its proposal and the Germans continued to support the Nationalists.

After the Fall of France in June 1940, Hermann Göring advised Adolf Hitler to occupy Spain and North Africa, rather than to invade the British Isles. Similarly, before the armistice with France had been signed, General Heinz Guderian also argued for seizing Britain's strategically-important naval base of Gibraltar. Guderian even urged Hitler to postpone the armistice so that he could rush on through Spain with two Panzer divisions, take Gibraltar and invade French North Africa. General Alfred Jodl, Chief of Staff of Oberkommando der Wehrmacht (OKW) operations, presented Hitler with a formal plan to cut Britain from the east of its empire by invading Spain, Gibraltar, North Africa and the Suez Canal, instead of invading Britain.

On 12 July 1940, the OKW set up a special group for the necessary planning. On 22 July, Admiral Wilhelm Canaris, the head of the Abwehr and an acknowledged expert on Spain, travelled with several other German officers to Madrid, Spain, where they held talks with the Spanish dictator, General Francisco Franco, and Spanish War Minister General Juan Vigón. They then travelled on to Algeciras, where they stayed some days to reconnoitre the approaches to Gibraltar, and they returned to Germany with the conclusion that Franco's regime was reluctant to enter the war. Canaris's group determined that Gibraltar might be seized by an air-supported ground assault by at least two infantry regiments, three engineer battalions and 12 artillery regiments. Canaris declared that without 380 mm (15 in) heavy assault cannon, which he knew were unavailable, Gibraltar could not be taken. When he reported to Field Marshal Wilhelm Keitel, Canaris gave his opinion that even if Germany were able, with the co-operation of Spain, to seize Gibraltar, the British would land in Morocco and French West Africa.

In August, Canaris met with Franco's brother-in-law, Ramón Serrano Súñer, who was about to become the Spanish Foreign Minister. Canaris urged Serrano Súñer to do what he could to convince Franco to stay out of the war. Soon afterward, Franco dispatched Serrano Súñer to Berlin to get an idea of Hitler's attitude since Canaris had assured him that Germany would not forcibly intervene in Spain. When Serrano Súñer met Hitler on 16 September, Hitler did not press very hard for Spanish involvement in the war, perhaps because he planned to meet Franco himself very soon.

On 24 August, Hitler approved a general plan to seize Gibraltar. On 23 October, he met Franco at Hendaye, France, and proposed for Spain to enter the war on the Axis side as early as January 1941. Gibraltar would be taken by special Wehrmacht units and turned over to Spain, but Franco refused the offer and emphasized Spain's need for large-scale military and economic assistance. Hitler took offence when Franco expressed doubts about the possibility of a German victory in fighting the British on its home territory. Franco also pointed out that even if the British Isles were invaded and conquered, the British government, as well as most of the British Army and the powerful Royal Navy, would probably retreat to Canada and continue the Battle of the Atlantic with the support of the United States.

A meaningless memorandum of understanding was signed at Hendaye by Franco and Hitler, with neither side getting what it wanted. A few days later, Hitler was reported to have told Benito Mussolini, "I would rather have four of my own teeth pulled out than go through another meeting with that man again!"

== Planning ==
Despite those problems, German military leaders proceeded to prepare for a large-scale operation against Gibraltar, codenamed Operation Felix. The plan called for two German army corps to enter Spain across the Pyrenees. One corps, under General Ludwig Kübler, was to cross Spain and assault Gibraltar, and the other, commanded by General Rudolf Schmidt, was to secure its flanks. Air support would need one fighter and two dive-bomber wings. The overall command of Felix was to be assigned to Field Marshal Walther von Reichenau. The plan also made provisions for the occupation of Spanish possessions in North Africa: Spanish Morocco, Río de Oro, and the Canary Islands, whose ports could then be used as bases for German U-boats.

=== Proposed German order of battle ===
Expeditionary Corps (forming the covering force); General Rudolf Schmidt

- 16th Motorized Infantry Division (to concentrate at Valladolid)
- 16th Panzer Division (Cáceres)
- SS Division Totenkopf (Seville)

49 Gebirgsarmeekorps or Army Mountain Corps (forming the assault force); General Ludwig Kübler

- Grossdeutschland Infantry Regiment
- 98th Regiment of the 1st Mountain Division
- 26 medium and heavy artillery battalions
- 3 observation battalions
- 3 engineer battalions, which would use up to 150 "Goliath" remotely-controlled mine clearing vehicles
- 2 Nebelwerfer battalions
- Regiment Brandenburg (detachment of 150)

=== Diplomatic issues ===
On November 12 1940, Hitler issued Führer Directive No. 18, which stated that "political measures to induce the prompt entry of Spain into the war have been initiated.... The aim of German intervention in the Iberian Peninsula (code name Felix) will be to drive the English out of the Western Mediterranean". It also mentioned the potential invasion of Portugal if the British gained a foothold and requested for the occupation of Madeira and the Azores to be investigated.

On December 5, Hitler met with the German High Command and decided to request permission from Franco for German troops to cross the Spanish border on 10 January 1941. It was planned that General Jodl would go to Spain to make preparations for the attack on Gibraltar as soon as Canaris had obtained Franco's agreement. Accordingly, Canaris met with Franco on 7 December and put to the need for Spain's immediate entry into the war. Franco responded that Spain was simply not capable of supporting the German Army because of shortages of food and the crippled infrastructure and nature of the country still recovering from its recent civil war, which had just officially ended on 1 April 1939. He also expressed his fear that a German seizure of Gibraltar would lead to the loss of the Canary Islands and of Spanish Africa by a British counterinvasion.

On receiving Canaris's report, Hitler decided that Operation Felix should be cancelled. His disappointment was reflected in a later letter to Mussolini in which he said, "I fear that Franco is committing here the greatest mistake of his life".

In the opening weeks of 1941, unsuccessful efforts were made by the ambassadors in Berlin and Rome to encourage the Spanish government to change its stance. Franco answered negatively to another request from Hitler to join the war that was received on 6 February citing the precarious state of Spain's economy and army. German Foreign Minister Joachim von Ribbentrop told Hitler that in his opinion, "Franco has no intention of ever joining the war". In February 1941, the OKW advised the naval high command that Operation Felix was out of the question for the time being since the troops that were earmarked for it would soon be needed elsewhere.

== British countermeasures ==
The British were well aware of Gibraltar's strategic value and its vulnerability to attack from the Spanish mainland. On the outbreak of war with Italy, most of the civilian population were evacuated to the United Kingdom and other parts of the Empire, except for those in vital jobs in the dockyard or who were members of the Gibraltar Defence Force. The garrison was more than doubled, and the anti-aircraft defences were greatly improved. Work started on a programme of improvements to Gibraltar's fortifications, including a new network of tunnels deep inside the Rock and a system of strongpoints and minefields covering the land border.

=== British garrison: spring 1941 ===
- 2nd Battalion, The King's Regiment
- 2nd Battalion, Somerset Light Infantry
- 4th Battalion, The Black Watch (from July 1940)
- 4th Battalion, Devonshire Regiment (from July 1940)
- 3rd Heavy Regiment, Royal Artillery, with 8 x 9.2 inch, 7 x 6 inch and 6 x twin 6 pounder coast artillery guns
- 10th Anti Aircraft Regiment, Royal Artillery, with 4 x 3 inch, 4 x 3.7 inch, and 2 x 2 pounder anti-aircraft guns
- 82nd Heavy AA Regiment, Royal Artillery, (from July 1940), with 16 x 3.7 inch guns, 8 x 40mm 40mm Bofors AA guns and radar
- 3rd Searchlight Battery, Royal Artillery.
- "Special Detachment" of No. 1 Tunnelling Company, Royal Canadian Engineers (from November 1940)
- No. 2 Tunnelling Company, Royal Canadian Engineers (from March 1941)
- Royal Engineers, Royal Signals and supporting arms.

A further countermeasure was the creation of a group of specialist army and navy officers known as the 128th Liaison Delegation Party, which would be activated in the event of the German Army moving into Spain. It had two alternative roles. The initial role would be to provide support to General Franco should he decide to resist the Germans and to provide liaison for any British force sent to support the Spanish forces. The second role, in the event of Franco colluding with the Germans, was to demolish Spanish ports and infrastructure and to organise resistance and sabotage with the participation of the Special Operations Executive. That role became pre-eminent later in the war when the group was renamed the Joint Intelligence Centre.

== Felix-Heinrich ==
On Hitler's insistence, the OKW developed a revised plan for the capture of Gibraltar, which might have been implemented once the German invasion of the Soviet Union had been completed. Codenamed Felix-Heinrich, the plan was submitted to General Franz Halder on 10 March 1941. It proposed that as soon as the invading forces in the Soviet Union reached a line between Kiev and Smolensk, hopefully by 15 July, units could then be withdrawn to prepare for the Gibraltar operation, which it was thought could begin on 15 October. Felix-Heinrich would broadly follow the original plan, with the same forces, but with new supporting units.

== See also ==
- Axis ship-watching activities in the Gibraltar area
- Military history of Gibraltar during World War II
- Operation Isabella
- Operation Pilgrim
- Spain in World War II
