= RFA Broomdale =

1937 Dale-class replenishment oiler for the Royal Fleet Auxiliary

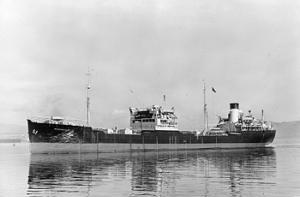

History

United Kingdom
- Name: RFA Broomdale
- Ordered: 1936
- Builder: Harland & Wolff, Govan
- Laid down: January 1937
- Launched: 2 September 1937
- Commissioned: 3 November 1937
- Decommissioned: 12 April 1959
- Fate: Arrived at Bruges for scrapping on 2 January 1960

General characteristics
- Class & type: Dale-class fleet tanker
- Displacement: 17,388 long tons full load
- Length: 483 ft 1 in (147.24 m)
- Beam: 61 ft 8 in (18.80 m)
- Draught: 27 ft 5 in (8.36 m)
- Propulsion: Burmeister & Wain 6-cylinder diesels with a single shaft. 490 nhp
- Speed: 11.5 knots (21.3 km/h)
- Complement: 44

RFA Broomdale (A168) was a Dale-class fleet tanker of the Royal Fleet Auxiliary. She spent much of her career in the Indian Ocean and Far East.

== Construction and design ==
The ship was ordered from the British Tanker Company of London from Harland & Wolff and was laid down on 29 December 1936 with Yard number 975. She was one of six tankers purchased during construction by the British Government to allow replacement of worn out ships of the Royal Fleet Auxiliary. She was launched as Broomdale on 2 September 1937, and was completed on 3 November 1937, entering service the same day.

Broomdale was 481 feet 6 inches (146.76 m) long overall and 464 feet 3 inches (141.50 m) between perpendiculars, with a beam of 62 feet (19 m) and a draught of 21 feet (6.4 m). She was powered by Doxford diesel engines rated at 4,000 brake horsepower (3,000 kW), giving a speed of 11.5 knots (21.3 km/h; 13.2 mph). Broomdale displaced 17,338 long tons (17,616 t), with a deadweight tonnage of 11,650 long tons (11,840 t). The ship had a Gross register tonnage of 8334 tons and a Net register tonnage of 4967 tons. The ship had a complement of 40.

== Service ==
While undergoing sea trials at Glasgow on 4 February 1938, Broomdale was involved in a collision with the New Zealand Shipping Company's cargo passenger ship SS Ruahine. Broomdale underwent repairs at Greenock. She spent the first year of the war operating between bases in Scotland and Norway, on 16 May 1940 she was attacked by four dive bombers and suffered minor damage from two near misses. Towards the end of 1940 she was moved to operations in the South Atlantic based at Port Stanley.

In April 1942 she was assigned to the British Eastern Fleet at Ceylon. She took part in Operation Stab and spent the next three years fuelling and escorting convoys across the Indian Ocean. On 14 April 1944 she sustained minor damage from the explosion of the ammunition ship Fort Stikine, and then in August was accidentally torpedoed by the submarine HMS Severn, rupturing two tanks and killing one.

After a brief trip back to the UK and the end of hostilities she was sent to the Far East, visiting Shanghai, Tokyo, Yokohama and Hong Kong.

She was refitted in 1947 and continued service across the world until sold in November 1959 and broken up two months later.
