= RFA Easedale =

1942 Dale-class replenishment oiler for the Royal Fleet Auxiliary

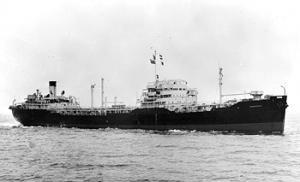

History

United Kingdom
- Name: RFA Easedale
- Builder: Furness Shipbuilding Company
- Laid down: 15 February 1941
- Launched: 18 December 1941
- Commissioned: 12 February 1942
- Decommissioned: 5 February 1959
- Fate: Arrived at Willebroek for scrapping on 7 March 1960

General characteristics
- Class & type: Dale-class fleet tanker
- Displacement: 16,820 tons full load
- Length: 479 ft (146.00 m)
- Beam: 61 ft 2 in (18.64 m)
- Draught: 27 ft 1 in (8.26 m)
- Propulsion: 3 cyl Triple expansion steam. 674 nhp. One shaft.
- Speed: 11.5 knots (21.3 km/h)
- Complement: 44

RFA Easedale (A105) was a Dale-class fleet tanker of the Royal Fleet Auxiliary.

She was decommissioned on 5 February 1959 and was laid up at Devonport Dockyard.
