= RFA Cedardale =

British fleet auxiliary vessel

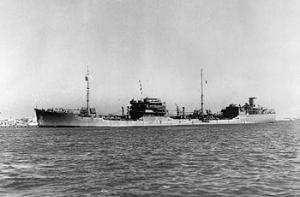

History

United Kingdom
- Name: RFA Cedardale
- Builder: Blythswood Shipbuilding Company Ltd, Scotstoun
- Launched: 25 March 1939
- Commissioned: 25 May 1939
- Decommissioned: 15 November 1959
- Fate: Sold for scrapping at Hong Kong on 2 February 1960

General characteristics
- Class & type: Dale-class fleet tanker
- Displacement: 17,000 long tons (17,273 t)
- Length: 483 ft (147 m)
- Beam: 58 ft 6 in (17.83 m)
- Draught: 27 ft 6 in (8.38 m)
- Propulsion: Burmeister & Wain 8-clylinder diesels with a single shaft
- Speed: 13 knots (15 mph; 24 km/h)
- Range: 16,400 nautical miles (30,370 km) at 11.5 knots (21 km/h)
- Capacity: 12,000 long tons (12,193 t)
- Complement: 40

RFA Cedardale (A380) was a Dale-class fleet tanker of the Royal Fleet Auxiliary. She was originally one of two ships which were purchased by the British Admiralty from Anglo-Saxon Petroleum for evaluation purposes. Cedardale was decommissioned on 15 November 1959 and laid up at Hong Kong.

== Career ==
Cedardale was built by Blythswood Shipbuilding Company, Scotstoun and launched on 25 March 1939. Her engines and machinery were fitted at James Watt Dock, Greenock, with her sea trials taking place in the Firth of Clyde on 24 May 1939. After the successful completion of these, Cedardale was accepted into Admiralty service on 25 May, departing two days later, on 27 May on her maiden voyage to Abadan, on the Persian Gulf. The first months of World War II were spent in the Red Sea and Eastern Mediterranean.

After returning to the UK in early 1940, Cedardale was despatched to Trinidad, and then to Freetown, where in July 1940 she was attached to Force R. She was based at Freetown until August 1942, during which time she refuelled several Royal Navy ships. Cedardale was at New Orleans in September and October 1942, undergoing repairs, refit and docking. She then sailed to the Seychelles, via Curaçao, Simonstown and Mauritius, remaining based in the Indian Ocean, operating between Mombasa, Addu Atoll, Trincomalee and Bombay until April 1943. She then returned to the Mediterranean for service with the allied forces gathering for Operation Husky, the allied invasion of Sicily. Attached as part of Force R, she provided refuelling support to the destroyers involved in the operation. The rest of 1943 was spent in the Mediterranean, with port calls at Port Said, Haifa, Alexandria, Malta and Tripoli.

Cedardale returned to the Indian Ocean in early 1944, with service at Diego Suarez, Colombo and Trincomalee. In March 1945 she was moved to the Pacific Ocean to support allied operations there, assigned to the British Pacific Fleet. Deployed off Leyte Gulf, she was part of Task Force 112 in Operation Iceberg, the British Fleet Train's contribution to the allied assault on Okinawa. The next few months were spent in these waters, often based out of Manus, Admiralty Islands, refuelling British and Australian vessels. After the surrender of Japan she sailed to Singapore, via Shanghai and Subic Bay, remaining there until December 1945, when she returned to the UK.

The postwar years were spent deployed to the Far East, making frequent voyages to and from the UK via the Indian Ocean and the Mediterranean. On 13 September 1958 she was one of several British ships, including RFA Sea Salvor, which took part in rescue and salvage operations after a two ship collision in the Gulf of Oman resulted in a large fire, with 24 deaths. Cedardale salvaged 11,000 tons of oil. She was laid up at Hong Kong on 15 November 1959, and advertised for sale on 3 December 1959. On 2 February 1960 she was sold for scrapping to Matthews Wighton at Hong Kong.
