= MV Esso Cadillac =

History
- Name: Empire Bronze (1940–46); Esso Cadillac (1946–56); Maribella II (1956–59)
- Owner: Ministry of War Transport (1940–46); Anglo American Oil Co Ltd (1946–56); Mariblanca Navigazione SA (1956–59)
- Operator: A Weir & Co Ltd (1940–42); Anglo American Oil Co Ltd (1942–56); Chandris (England) Ltd (1956–59)
- Port of registry: (United Kingdom) South Shields (1940–56); (Liberia) Monrovia (1956–59)
- Builder: R & W Hawthorn, Leslie & Co Ltd, Newcastle upon Tyne.
- Yard number: 627
- Launched: 19 August 1940
- Completed: November 1940
- Out of service: 14 August 1959
- Identification: UK Official Number 168646 (1940–56); Code Letters GMYV (1940–56)
- Fate: Scrapped

General characteristics
- Tonnage: 8,149 GRT; 4,770 NRT
- Length: 465 ft 3 in (141.81 m)
- Beam: 59 ft 3 in (18.06 m)
- Depth: 33 ft 8 in (10.26 m)
- Propulsion: 1 x 4SCSA diesel engine
- Speed: 10.5 knots (19.4 km/h)

Esso Cadillac was an 8,149 GRT tanker which was built in 1940 as Empire Bronze for the Ministry of War Transport (MoWT). She was sold into civil service in 1946 and renamed Esso Cadillac. Another change of ownership in 1956 saw her renamed Maribella II and she served under this name until scrapped in 1959.

== Description ==
Empire Bronze was built by R & W Hawthorn, Leslie & Co Ltd, Newcastle upon Tyne. She was yard number 627. Launched on 19 August 1940, she was completed in November 1940.

The ship was 465 feet 3 inches (141.81 m) long, with a beam of 59 feet 3 inches (18.06 m) and a depth of 33 feet 8 inches (10.26 m). She was propelled by a 4-stroke Single Cycle Single Action diesel engine which had eight cylinders of 25 9/16 inches (649 mm) bore by 22 1/8 inches (560 mm) stroke. The engine was built by Hawthorn Leslie. She had a GRT of 8,149 with a NRT of 4,770.

== Career ==
Empire Bronze's port of registry was South Shields. She was initially operated under the management of A Weir Ltd. Empire Bronze was a member of a number of convoys during the Second World War.

HX 152

Convoy HX 152 departed Halifax, Nova Scotia on 28 September 1941 and arrived at Liverpool on 14 October. Empire Bronze was described as "an odd-looking ship".

HX 196

Convoy HX 196 departed Halifax, Nova Scotia on 29 June 1942 and arrived at Liverpool on 10 July.

In 1942, management of Empire Bronze was transferred to Anglo-American Oil Co Ltd. In 1946, the ship was sold to Anglo-American Oil and renamed Esso Cadillac. Her port of registry remained at South Shields. In 1956, Esso Cadillac was sold to Mariblanca Navigazione SA, Panama and was renamed Maribella II. She was operated under the management of Chandris (England) Ltd. Maribella II was in service until 1959, arriving at Okinawa, Japan on 14 August 1959 for scrapping by Hanwa Co Ltd.

== Official Numbers and Code Letters ==
Official Numbers were a forerunner to IMO Numbers. Empire Bronze and Esso Cadillac had the UK Official Number 168646 and used the Code Letters GMYV.
