= RFA Echodale =

1941 Dale-class replenishment oiler for the Royal Fleet Auxiliary

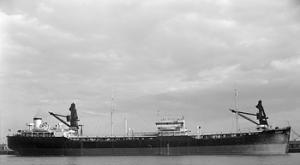

History

United Kingdom
- Name: RFA Echodale
- Builder: Hawthorn Leslie and Company
- Laid down: 8 January 1940
- Launched: 29 November 1940
- Commissioned: 4 March 1941
- Decommissioned: 12 April 1959
- Fate: Arrived at Spezia for scrapping on 20 September 1961

General characteristics
- Class & type: Dale-class fleet tanker
- Displacement: 17,000 tons full load
- Length: 483 ft 4 in (147.32 m)
- Beam: 59 ft 4 in (18.08 m)
- Draught: 27 ft 6.5 in (8.39 m)
- Propulsion: Burmeister & Wain 8-cylinder diesels with a single shaft 6,800 hp (5,100 kW).
- Speed: 11.5 knots (21.3 km/h)
- Complement: 44

RFA Echodale (A170) was a Dale-class fleet tanker of the Royal Fleet Auxiliary.

She was decommissioned on 12 April 1959 and was laid up at Devonport Dockyard.
