= RFA Ennerdale (A173) =

1941 Dale-class replenishment oiler for the Royal Fleet Auxiliary

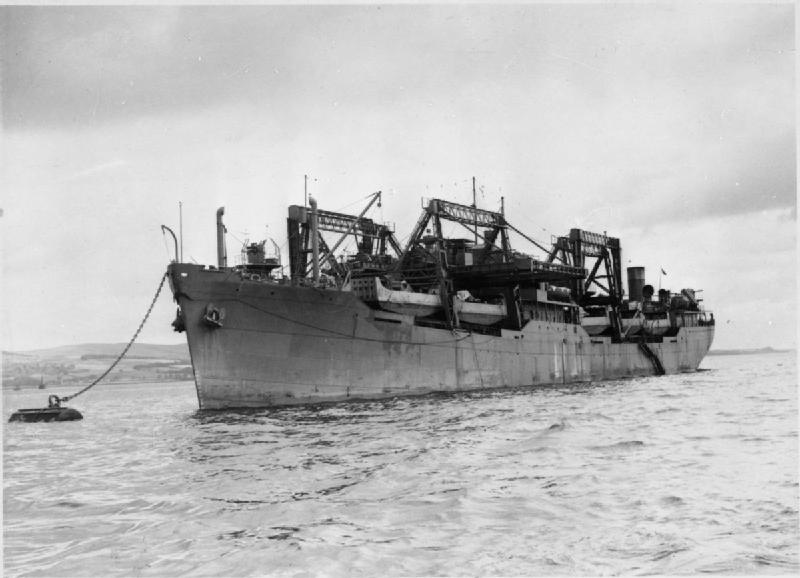

History

United Kingdom
- Name: RFA Ennerdale
- Builder: Swan Hunter
- Laid down: 1939
- Launched: 27 January 1941
- Commissioned: 11 July 1941
- Decommissioned: March 1958
- Fate: Sold for scrapping, broken up 1959

General characteristics
- Class & type: Dale-class fleet tanker
- Displacement: 16,782 long tons (17,051 t)
- Length: 483 ft (147 m)
- Beam: 59 ft 6 in (18.14 m)
- Draught: 27 ft 6 in (8.38 m)
- Propulsion: 1 × triple expansion steam engine, 1 shaft
- Speed: 11.5 knots (13.2 mph; 21.3 km/h)
- Complement: 44

RFA Ennerdale (A173) was a Dale-class fleet tanker and landing ship (gantry) of the Royal Fleet Auxiliary.

Taken over by the Admiralty and completed as a Landing Ship Gantry carrying 15 LCMs with accommodation for 150 military personnel. Took part in the North African, Italian, and Far East landings.

In August 1943, Captain S.T. Dunster was awarded the OBE. The citation read:

"The ship [RFA Ennerdale] played a vital part in carrying oil and petrol to forces operating off the coast of North Africa and was the focus of sustained and heavy air attacks. So skillfully was she handled by her Master and so efficient was her barrage that she sustained no damage, and performed invaluable work. In addition to this service, her Master did well in two Malta Convoys earlier in the war. His courage and resource have been unfailing."

In December 1945 she was damaged by a mine at Port Swettenham in Malaya, and returned to the UK for repair. After the war she resumed freighting duties as a tanker.

Ennerdale was sold to the British Iron & Steel Corporation for scrapping and broken up 1959–60.
