= RFA Dewdale (A151) =

1941 Dale-class replenishment oiler for the Royal Fleet Auxiliary

History

United Kingdom
- Name: RFA Dewdale
- Builder: Cammell Laird
- Laid down: 1939
- Launched: 17 February 1941
- Commissioned: 14 June 1941
- Decommissioned: 6 May 1959
- Fate: Arrived Antwerp for scrapping, 23 December 1959

General characteristics
- Class & type: Dale-class fleet tanker
- Displacement: 16,782 long tons (17,051 t)
- Length: 483 ft (147 m)
- Beam: 59 ft 6 in (18.14 m)
- Draught: 27 ft 6 in (8.38 m)
- Propulsion: 1 × 8-cylinder B&W diesel, 502 nhp, 1 shaft
- Speed: 11.5 knots (13.2 mph; 21.3 km/h)
- Complement: 70

Service record
- Operations: World War II; Operation Torch; Operation Tiderace

RFA Dewdale (A151) was a Dale-class fleet tanker and landing ship (gantry) of the Royal Fleet Auxiliary.

Taken over by the Admiralty and completed as a Landing Ship Gantry carrying 15 LCMs with accommodation for 150 military personnel. Her landing craft were in the first assault waves during the North African landings in 1943. Credited with shooting down two Ju 88s at Bougie, she was later damaged by bombing at Algiers and returned to UK for repairs in October 1944. Later in the war she served in the eastern Mediterranean and with the Eastern Fleet during the Malaya Landings.

Reconverted to a tanker at Portsmouth by March 1947, she resumed freighting duties before being sold to Netransmar Cie. SA for scrap in 1959.
