= RFA Abbeydale =

1937 Dale-class replenishment oiler for the Royal Fleet Auxiliary

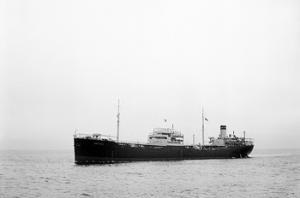

History

United Kingdom
- Name: RFA Abbeydale
- Ordered: 1936
- Builder: Swan Hunter and Wigham Richardson Ltd, Wallsend
- Launched: 28 December 1936
- Commissioned: 4 March 1937
- Decommissioned: 18 September 1959
- Honours and awards: North Africa 1942
- Fate: Arrived at ship breakers for scrapping on 4 September 1960

General characteristics
- Displacement: 17,210 tons full load
- Length: 481 ft 6 in (146.76 m)
- Beam: 61 ft 8 in (18.80 m)
- Draught: 27 ft 6 in (8.38 m)
- Propulsion: 1 × 4 cyl Doxford diesel engine; 687 nhp; One shaft
- Speed: 11.5 knots (21.3 km/h)
- Complement: 44

RFA Abbeydale (A109) was a fleet tanker of the Royal Fleet Auxiliary and was originally one of six ships ordered by the British Tanker Co which were purchased on the stocks by the Admiralty. She was built by Swan Hunter and Wigham Richardson Ltd and launched on 28 December 1936. Abbeydale served until being decommissioned on 18 September 1959 and laid up at HMNB Devonport. She was then sold for scrapping, arriving at the Thos. W. Ward breakers' yards at Barrow-in-Furness on 4 September 1960.

== Career ==
Ordered by the British Tanker Company in 1936, Abbeydale was built by Swan Hunter and Wigham Richardson Ltd, Wallsend and launched on 28 December 1936. She was taken over by the Admiralty on 4 March 1937 after completing her sea trials, and on 5 March 1937 sailed from the River Tyne bound for Trinidad on her maiden voyage. She made several voyages between Abadan on the Persian Gulf, and on the outbreak of the Second World War she was returning to the UK from Australia and New Zealand. She sailed to Trinidad in October 1939 and in December was at Kingston, Jamaica. On 29 December 1939 the German newspaper Bremer Zeituag falsely reported Abbeydale as one of a number of ships that had been sunk. Early 1940 was spent in the Caribbean and Pacific, calling at Callao, Colón, Kingston and Bermuda. On 30 March 1940 she caught fire at Bermuda while moored alongside RFA Orangeleaf and both ships were damaged.

Abbeydale returned to the UK in May 1940. She was refitted on the River Clyde in November and December 1940, returning to the Caribbean in early 1941. From there she operated in the South Atlantic, calling at Rio de Janeiro, Montevideo and Port Stanley, Falkland Islands. She underwent repairs at Trinidad in September 1941 and at New Orleans from December 1941 to January 1942. Abbeydale arrived at Freetown in February 1942, and sailed from there to Saint Helena. She operated from Saint Helena and into the Atlantic over the next few months, refuelling Royal Navy warships. In October she was refitted at Gibraltar as a defensively equipped merchant ship and in November was assigned to support Operation Torch, the Allied invasion of North Africa. For her service she was awarded the battle honour "North Africa 1942". She sustained some damage that month after colliding with a sunken wreck off Oran, damage that had been repaired by December. In January 1943 Abbeydale returned to the UK to undergo more thorough repairs and refitting, and in March sailed for New York with a convoy, before returning to the Mediterranean with a convoy the following month.

In May 1943 she was assigned to Operation Husky, the Allied invasion of Sicily. On 18 June 1943 Abbeydale sailed from Gibraltar bound for Alexandria in Convoy XTG 2. On 27 June 1943 she was torpedoed by U-73 off the Algerian coast. There were no fatalities, but Abbeydale was severely damaged, breaking in two. HMS Salvestor towed the damaged vessel to Algiers, with both parts later towed to Taranto dockyard, the aft section arriving on 14 October 1944 and the fore section on 18 October 1944. Work to reunite the halves did not begin until 30 May 1945, and the repaired Abbeydale did not return to service until June 1946.

Postwar, Abbeydale spent most of her time sailing between the UK, the Persian Gulf, Indian Ocean and the Pacific, with occasional visits to the Caribbean. On 19 June 1954, while sailing from Finnart to the Persian Gulf, she was involved in a collision with the British steamer Charles Dickens at Aden. The Charles Dickens struck the moored Abbeydale while attempting to berth, with both vessels sustaining some damage. On 18 September 1959 Abbeydale was laid up at Devonport, and was put up for sale on 5 July 1960. She was sold on 11 August 1960 to British Iron & Steel Corporation for scrapping, and on 4 September 1960 arrived under tow from the tug Campaigner at Thos. W. Ward breakers' yards at Barrow-in-Furness. Her scrapping began on 14 September 1960.
