= RFA Darkdale =

Dale-class replenishment oiler for the Royal Fleet Auxiliary

Coordinates: 15°55′07″S 5°43′21″W

History

United Kingdom
- Name: Empire Oil (1940); RFA Darkdale (1940–41)
- Owner: Ministry of Shipping (1940); Admiralty (1940–41)
- Operator: Royal Fleet Auxiliary (1940–41)
- Port of registry: Glasgow, United Kingdom (1940); Royal Navy (1940–41)
- Builder: Blythswood Shipbuilding Company, Scotstoun
- Laid down: October 1939
- Launched: 23 July 1940
- Completed: November 1940
- Identification: United Kingdom Official Number 165991
- Fate: Sunk 22 October 1941

General characteristics
- Class & type: Dale-class fleet tanker
- Tonnage: 8,145 GRT, 4,743 NRT
- Length: 468 feet 0 inches (142.65 m)
- Beam: 56 feet 3 inches (17.15 m)
- Draught: 33 feet 3 inches (10.13 m)
- Depth: 39 feet 8 inches (12.09 m)
- Installed power: Diesel engine
- Propulsion: Screw propeller
- Armament: 1 × 4.7-inch gun; 1 × 12-pounder gun; 2 × "Pig trough" rocket launchers; 2 × Hotchkiss machine guns; 2 × Marlin machine guns; 2 × Lewis guns; Parachute and cable rockets

RFA Darkdale was a Dale-class fleet tanker of the Royal Fleet Auxiliary (RFA), launched on 23 July 1940 as Empire Oil, completed in November 1940 and transferred to the RFA as Darkdale. She was sunk during the Second World War on 22 October 1941 by the German submarine U-68. Her wreck in James Bay off Jamestown, Saint Helena continued to leak oil, posing a potential environmental threat to the coastal waters of Saint Helena, until Ministry of Defence divers drained the ship's tanks in 2015.

== Description ==
Empire Oil was 468 feet 0 inches (142.65 m) long, with a beam of 56 feet 3 inches (17.15 m). She had a depth of 39 feet 8 inches (12.09 m), and a draught of 33 feet 3 inches (10.13 m). She was assessed at 8,145 GRT, 4,743 NRT. The ship was powered by a four-stroke single cycle single acting diesel engine which had six cylinders of 29 1/8 inches diameter by 59 1/16 inches stroke. The engine was built by J G Kincaid & Co Ltd, Greenock, Renfrewshire. As RFA Darkdale, her armament comprised a 4.7-inch gun, a 12-pounder gun, two "pig trough" rocket launchers, two Hotchkiss machine guns, two Marlin machine guns and two Lewis guns with parachute and cable rockets.

== History ==
Empire Oil was built by Blythswood Shipbuilding Company of Scotstoun, Glasgow. She was laid down in October 1939, launched on 23 July 1940, completed in November 1940. Built for the Ministry of Shipping, her port of registry was Glasgow. The United Kingdom Official Number 165991 was allocated. Empire Oil was subsequently transferred to the Royal Fleet Auxiliary as RFA Darkdale.

In August 1941 she arrived at Saint Helena, as fleet oiler for the South Atlantic and refuelled a number of Royal Navy ships there including the cruiser HMS Dorsetshire and the aircraft carrier HMS Eagle. At anchor in James Bay in the early hours of 22 October 1941, she was struck by four torpedoes from the German submarine U-68, commanded by Karl-Friedrich Merten, broke in two and sank. Forty-one men were lost and two men on deck were blown clear and survived. Seven men, including the captain, were ashore. The lost crew are commemorated on the Cenotaph at Jamestown and at the Tower Hill Memorial in London.

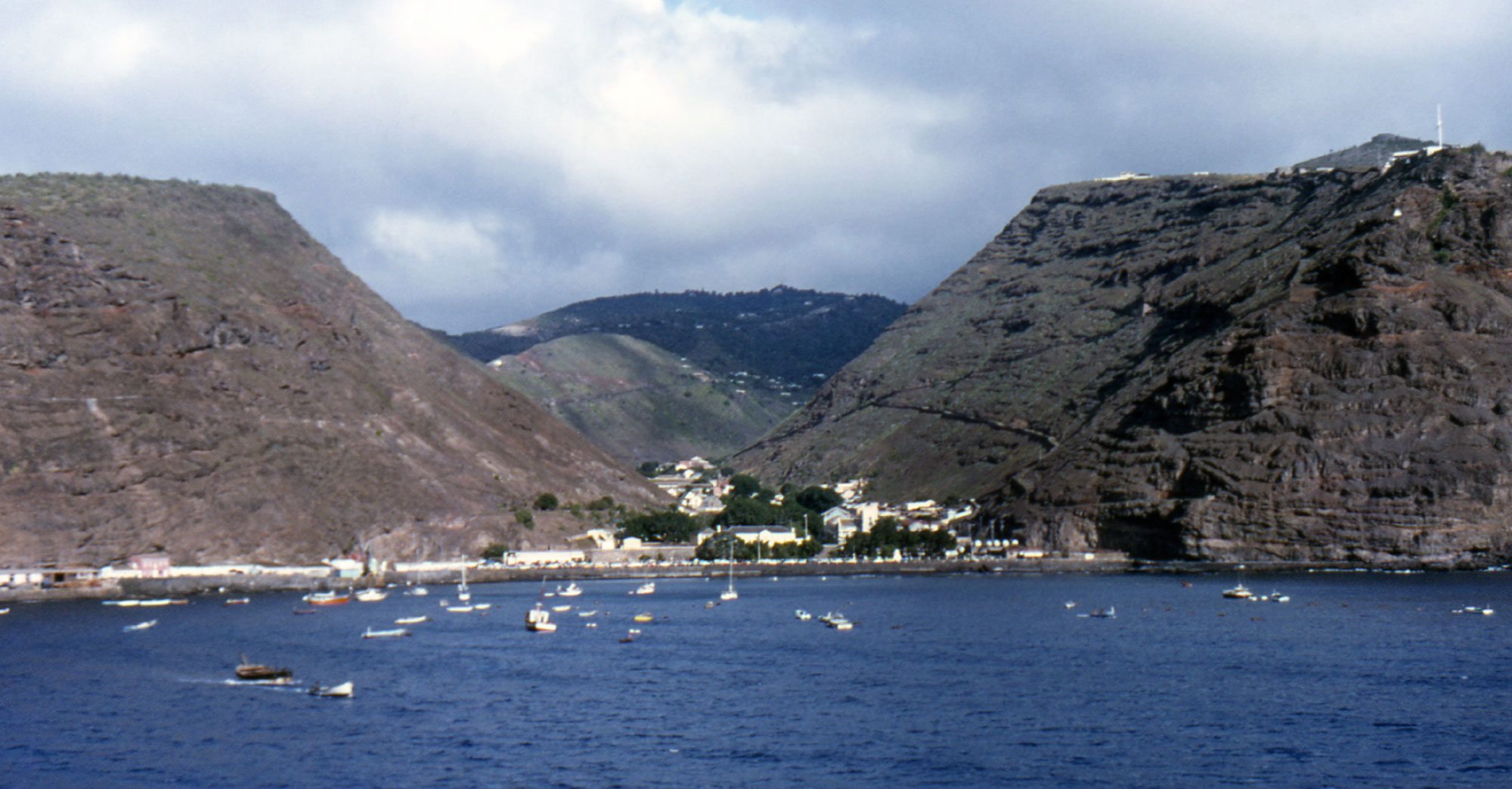
View from James Bay towards Jamestown, Saint Helena

The wreck leaked fuel oil, posing a potential environmental threat to the coastal waters of Saint Helena. In April 2012 a team from Salvage and Marine Operations, an arm of the Defence Equipment and Support organisation Ministry of Defence (MOD), left for Saint Helena to examine the wreck. The ice patrol ship HMS Protector surveyed it in October 2012 to provide additional sonar imagery. In 2015, Salvage and Marine Operations divers drained 1,944 cubic metres (68,700 cu ft) of oil from the ship's tanks. Royal Navy divers also removed 38 shells from the two main guns.
