= HMS Teviot Bank =

Cargo steamship that was a Royal Navy auxiliary minelayer in WW2

History
- Name: 1938: Teviotbank; 1940: Teviot Bank; 1955: Nella
- Namesake: 1938: River Teviot
- Owner: 1938: Bank Line; 1956: Cia de Nav Nella SA
- Operator: 1938: Andrew Weir & Co; 1940: (United Kingdom) Royal Navy
- Port of registry: 1938: (United Kingdom) Glasgow; 1955: Panama
- Builder: J Readhead & Sons, S Shields
- Yard number: 511
- Launched: 1 December 1937
- Completed: February 1938
- Commissioned: 1939
- Decommissioned: 1944
- Identification: 1938: UK official number 165927; Call sign GDGZ; 1940: Pennant number M04; 1956: Call sign HPVL
- Fate: Scrapped in 1971

General characteristics
- Type: 1938: Cargo ship; 1939: Auxiliary minelayer
- Tonnage: 5,087 GRT, 2,981 NRT
- Length: 423.7 ft (129.1 m)
- Beam: 56.7 ft (17.3 m)
- Draught: 25 ft 0 1/4 in (7.63 m)
- Depth: 24.8 ft (7.6 m)
- Decks: 1
- Installed power: 524 NHP
- Propulsion: 1 × Propeller; 1 × Triple-expansion engine
- Speed: 12 knots (22 km/h)
- Sensors & processing systems: 1938: Echo sounding device; 1959: Wireless direction finding, radiotelephone
- Armament: 1 × 4-inch gun; 1 × 2-pounder gun; 4 × Oerlikon 20 mm cannons; 4 × 0.5-inch machine guns; 280 × mines
- Notes: Sister ships: Tielbank, Testbank

HMS Teviot Bank was a Bank Line steamship that was built in England in 1938 as the cargo ship Teviotbank. In the Second World War she was a Royal Navy auxiliary minelayer. By 1956 a Panamanian company had bought her and renamed her Nella. She was scrapped in Italy in 1971.

This was the first of two Bank Line ships called Teviotbank. The second was a motor ship that was built in 1967, sold in 1979, and scuttled in 1993.

== Building & identification ==
In 1937 and 1938 John Readhead & Sons built three sister ships in their shipyard at South Shields on the River Tyne for Bank Line. Tielbank was yard number 509, launched in June 1937 and completed that August. Testbank was yard number 510, launched in September 1937 and completed that November. Teviotbank was yard number 511, launched on 1 December 1937 and completed in February 1938.

Teviotbank's registered length was 423.7 ft (129.1 m), her beam was 56.7 ft (17.3 m) and her depth was 24.8 ft (7.6 m). Her tonnages were 5,087 GRT and 2,981 NRT. She had a single screw, driven by a three-cylinder triple-expansion steam engine that was rated at 524 NHP and gave her a speed of 12 knots (22 km/h).

Bank Line registered Teviotbank at Glasgow. Her UK official number was 165927 and her wireless telegraph call sign was GDGZ.

== Minelayer ==
After the UK entered the Second World War in September 1939, the Admiralty requisitioned Teviotbank and had her converted into a minelayer. She had capacity to carry and lay 280 mines. She was armed with one QF 4-inch naval gun Mk V, one QF 2-pounder naval gun, four Oerlikon 20 mm cannons and four Vickers .50 machine guns. She was commissioned as HMS Teviot Bank, with the pennant number M04.

Sweden was exporting iron ore to Germany through ports in Norway. In March 1940, Teviot Bank and Royal Navy minelaying destroyers from flotilla D20 were sent on Operation Wilfred, which was to two minefields off the Norwegian coast with the intention of preventing German cargo ships from reaching those ports. The minelayers were on their way to Norwegian waters when Germany invaded Norway on 9 April. Teviot Bank was meant to lay a minefield off Stadlandet in western Norway, but this was immediately cancelled to release her escort ship for fleet duty.

In September 1940 Teviot Bank laid 541 mines in fjords between the Faroe Islands, to restrict neutral shipping movements. In February 1941 Teviot Bank was damaged by a near miss off the east coast of Britain. She spent four weeks being repaired. In July 1941 she was transferred to reinforce ships laying the Northern Barrage.

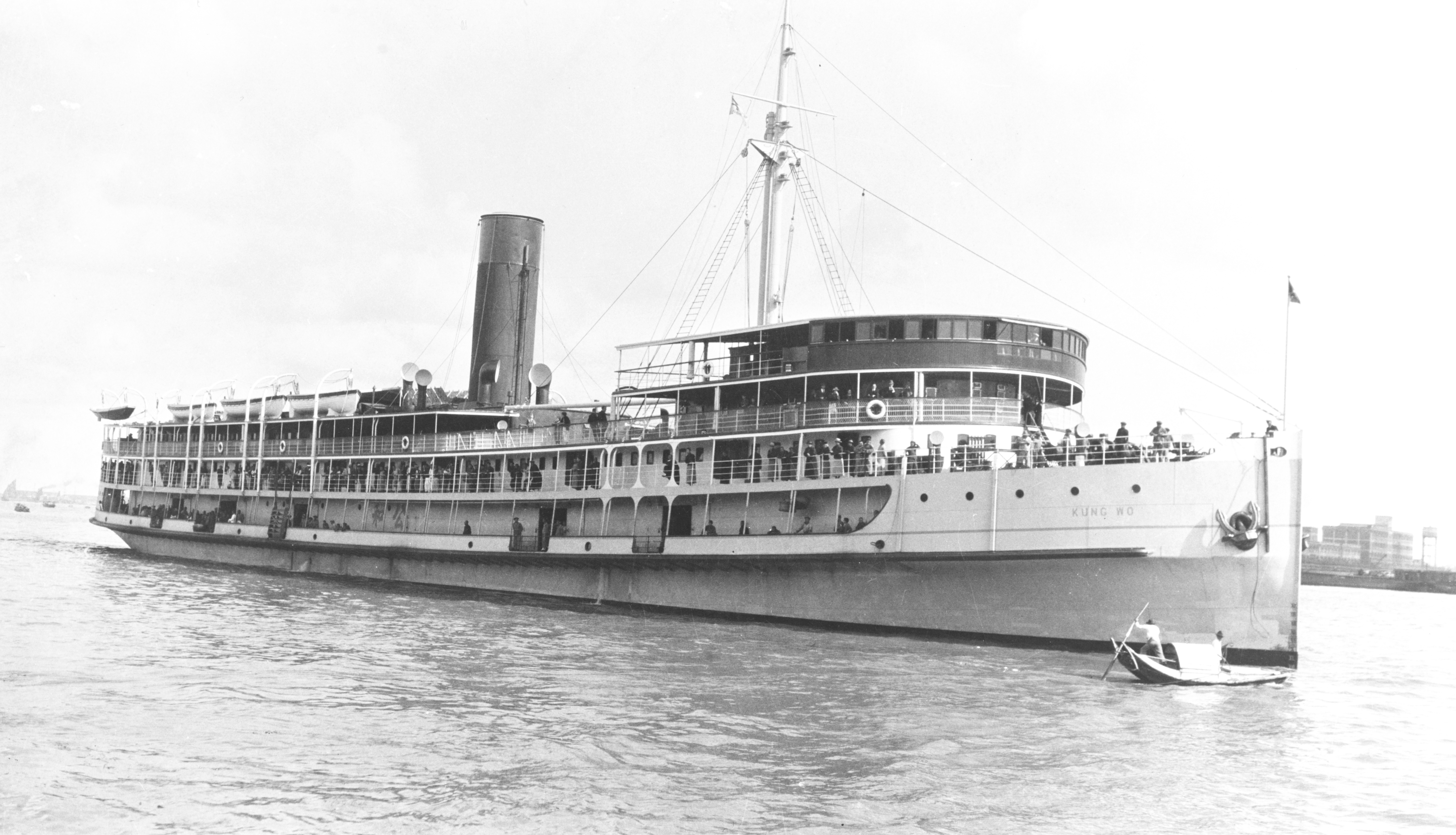
The Indo-China Steam Navigation Company Ltd. passenger ship Kung Wo, which was converted into a minelayer, and with Teviot Bank mined the eastern entrance to the Port of Singapore.

By December 1941 Teviot Bank was in Singapore. She worked with Kung Wo, an Indo-China Steam Navigation Company Ltd. passenger ship that had been converted into an auxiliary minelayer, to lay a large anti-submarine minefield across the eastern entrance to the Port of Singapore.

In March 1942 Teviot Bank laid a minefield in the South Preparis Channel in the Andaman Islands. That December she laid a deep anti-submarine minefield at the entrance to the Red Sea off Aden.

In 1944 Teviot Bank was sent west from the East Indies to lay a minefield in the Mediterranean off Anzio in Italy, but she was diverted and the plan was cancelled. Later she laid a minefield off Capri.

== Post-war service ==
The ship was returned to her owners and resumed merchant trade as Teviot Bank. By 1956 the Compañía de Navegacion Nella SA had bought her and renamed her Nella. She was registered under the Panamanian flag of convenience, and her Panamanian call sign was HPVL. By 1959 her navigation equipment included wireless direction finding and radiotelephone.

On 16 February 1971 Nella arrived in La Spezia in Italy to be scrapped. Ship breaking started on 23 February.

== Bibliography ==
- Lenton, HT; Colledge, JJ (1968). British and Dominion Warships of World War II. Garden City, NY: Doubleday & Co.
- Lloyd's Register of Shipping (PDF). Vol. II.–Steamers and Motorships of 300 Tons Gross and Over. London: Lloyd's Register of Shipping. 1938 – via Southampton City Council.
- Mercantile Navy List. London. 1939 – via Crew List Index Project.
- "New Entries, 2". Register Book. Vol. I Register of Ships. London: Lloyd's Register of Shipping. 1955 – via Internet Archive.
- Register Book. Vol. I Register of Ships. London: Lloyd's Register of Shipping. 1959 – via Internet Archive.
- Rohwer, Jürgen (2005). Chronology of the War at Sea 1939–1945: The Naval History of World War Two (Third Revised ed.). Annapolis, MD: Naval Institute Press. ISBN 1-59114-119-2.
