= SS Testbank =

British cargo steamship that was destroyed in the 1943 air raid on Bari

Coordinates: 41°07′31″N 16°52′0″E

History

United Kingdom
- Name: Testbank
- Namesake: River Test
- Owner: Bank Line
- Operator: Andrew Weir & Co
- Port of registry: Glasgow
- Builder: J Readhead & Sons, S Shields
- Yard number: 510
- Launched: 6 September 1937
- Completed: 6 November 1937
- Identification: UK official number 165919; Call sign GDDZ
- Fate: Sunk, 2 December 1943

General characteristics
- Type: Cargo ship
- Tonnage: 5,083 GRT, 2,981 NRT
- Length: 423.7 ft (129.1 m)
- Beam: 56.7 ft (17.3 m)
- Draught: 25 ft 0 1/4 in (7.63 m)
- Depth: 24.8 ft (7.6 m)
- Decks: 1
- Installed power: 524 NHP
- Propulsion: 1 × Propeller; 1 × triple-expansion engine
- Speed: 12 knots (22 km/h)
- Crew: 1943: 75, including DEMS gunners
- Sensors & processing systems: Echo sounding device
- Notes: Sister ships: Tielbank, Teviotbank

SS Testbank was a British cargo steamship that was built in England in 1937 and sunk with heavy loss of life in the air raid on Bari in December 1943. She was the first of two Bank Line cargo ships to be called Testbank. The second was a motor ship that was built in 1961, sold and renamed in 1978, and scrapped in 1987.

== Building ==
In 1937 and 1938 John Readhead & Sons built three sister ships in their shipyard at South Shields on the River Tyne for Bank Line. Tielbank was yard number 509, launched in June 1937 and completed that August. Testbank was yard number 510, launched on 6 September 1937 and completed that November. Teviotbank was yard number 511, launched in December 1937 and completed in February 1938.

Testbank's registered length was 423.7 ft (129.1 m), her beam was 56.7 ft (17.3 m) and her depth was 24.8 ft (7.6 m). Her tonnages were 5,083 GRT and 2,981 NRT. She had a single screw, driven by a three-cylinder triple-expansion steam engine that was rated at 524 NHP and gave her a speed of 12 knots (22 km/h).

On 6 November 1937, John Readhead & Sons delivered Testbank to Bank Line, who registered her at Glasgow. Her UK official number was 165919 and her wireless telegraph call sign was GDDZ.

== War service ==
Testbank tramped in the Second World War. On 10 September 1939 she left Brisbane for Sydney. She called Melbourne, Newcastle, NSW, and again at Sydney, where she left for Britain on 22 October. She sailed via Colombo, the Suez Canal and Gibraltar, where she joined Convoy HG 10 bound for home waters. Testbank was carrying a cargo of air raid shelters. She arrived in Newport, Wales, on 17 December.

On 31 December 1939 Testbank left Newport for Milford Haven, where she arrived on New Year's Day 1940. The next day she left to join Convoy OB 64, which dispersed in the Atlantic on 5 December. Testbank sailed via the Panama Canal and Esquimalt to Vancouver, where she was in port from 13 to 19 February. She called at Chemainus and Victoria, BC, whence she sailed on 24 February to return home. She sailed via the Panama Canal to Halifax, Nova Scotia, where she joined Convoy HX 30 bound for home waters. She was carrying a cargo of grain, lead and timber. She reached The Downs off the Kent coast on 9 April.

Testbank began her next voyage by joining Convoy OA 139, which assembled off Southend-on-Sea and sailed on 1 May 1940. OA 139 dispersed at sea, and Testbank continued to Barry in Wales. On 13 May she left Barry for Milford Haven, where she oeft on 14 May to join Convoy OB 148. This became Convoy OG 30F, which took her as far as Gibraltar. She continued independently to Bône in Algeria, where she was in port from 26 May to 2 June, during the Battle of France. She returned via Gibraltar, where she joined Convoy HG 33F for home waters. She detached from HG 33F, and reached The Downs on 13 June. The next day she joined Convoy FN 195B off Southend, which was headed for Methil on the Firth of Forth.

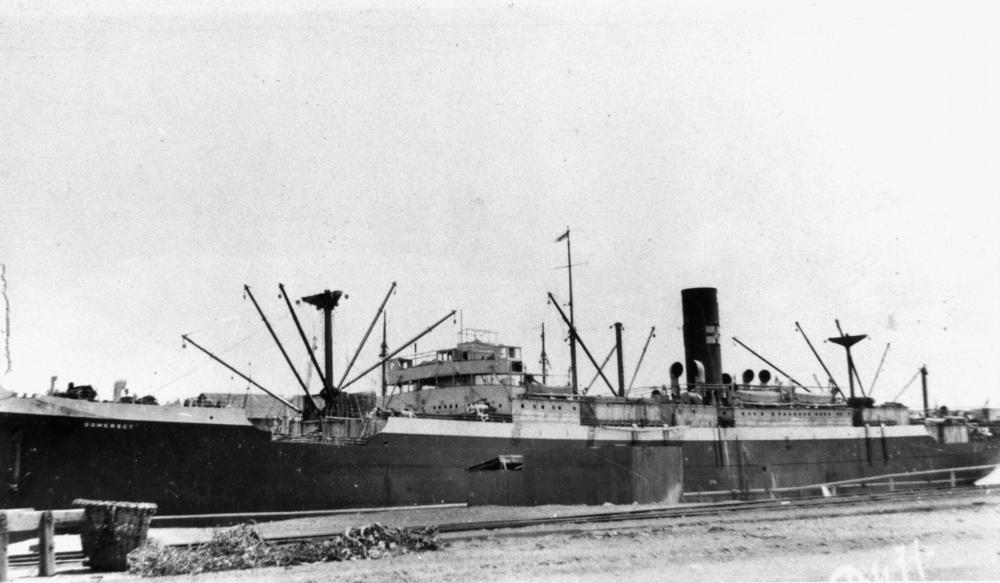
The Federal SN Co refrigerated cargo ship Somerset, which was sunk in an air attack on Convoy SL 72

On 26 June 1940 Testbank left the River Tyne with Convoy FS 205 to waters off Southend, where she joined outward bound Convoy OA 176. This dispersed at sea, after which Testbank continued unescorted to Durban and Cape Town, reaching the latter on 7 August 1940.

=== Collision with Ceramic ===
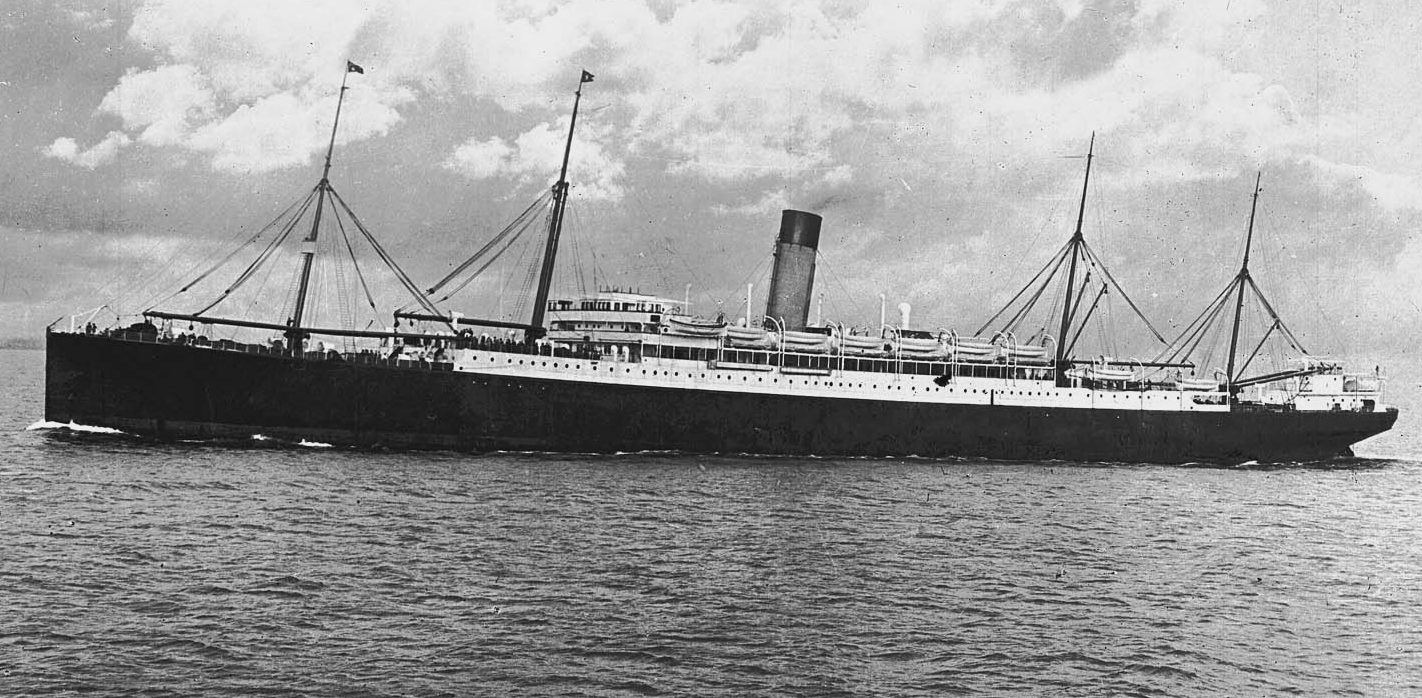
The Shaw, Savill & Albion liner Ceramic, with which Testbank collided off Cape Town on 11 August 1940

The next day Testbank left Cape Town, but on 11 August she collided with the Shaw, Savill & Albion liner Ceramic. Under wartime conditions, both ships were sailing without navigation lights. Testbank's lookout saw Ceramic ahead at a range of about 1 1/2 nautical miles (2.8 km), but Ceramic's lookout failed to see Testbank until the two ships were within about 350 yards (320 m) of each other. Both ships took avoiding action, but too late.

The combined impact speed was about 25 kn (46 km/h). Testbank struck Ceramic's starboard side in way of her Number 1 hold, crushing Testbank's bow by about 20 ft (6 m), and making a hole about 40 by 40 ft (12 by 12 m) in Ceramic's hull. Unusually for a ship of her era, Testbank had her crew accommodation in her aftercastle instead of her forecastle. This saved the men's lives. Testbank returned to Cape Town for repairs, and a tug helped Ceramic to reach Walvis Bay.

=== Return to service ===
On 3 March 1941 Testbank left Cape Town for Durban. She called at Lourenço Marques and Beira in Mozambique, and then returned via Cape Town and Freetown in Sierra Leone, where she joined Convoy SL 72. On 11 May a German aircraft attacked SL 72, sinking the refrigerated cargo ship Somerset. Testbank and the remainder of SL 72 reached Liverpool on 14 June.

On 8 June 1941 Testbank left Liverpool with Convoy OB 331, which dispersed at sea on 19 June. She continued unescorted to Tampa, where she was in port from 30 June to 14 July, loading phosphate. She returned unescorted as far as Halifax, NS, where she joined Convoy HX 140, with which she reached Liverpool on 6 August 1941.

On 12 August 1941Testbank left Liverpool with Convoy OS 6, which took her as far as waters off Freetown. She continued unescorted via Cape Town, Durban, Aden and the Suez Canal to Alexandria in Egypt, where she was in port from 2 to 22 December. Thence she went back through the Suez Canal to Calcutta, where she was in port from 15 to 30 January 1942. She returned home via Vizag, Durban, Cape Town and Freetown, where she joined Convoy SL 104. She reached Belfast Lough on 12 April, where she joined Convoy BB 161 to Milford Haven. There she joined Convoy WP 142 to The Solent, and arrived at Southampton on 18 April.

On 25 April 1942 Testbank left Cowes Roads with Convoy PW 146, which was headed for Milford Haven. She continued independently to Newport, where she was in port from 27 April to 18 May. She then returned to Milford Haven, whence she joined Convoy OS 29, which took her as far as Freetown. Testbank continued via Cape Town, Durban and Aden to Suez, and thence via Aden again to Basra in Iraq, where she was in port from 12 September until 1 October. She then sailed to Bandar Abbas in Iran, where she joined Convoy PB 4. This was headed for Bombay, but Testbank detached for Karachi, and then continued via Colombo and Vizag to Calcutta, where she was in port from 22 October until 3 November.

=== Rescue of Dona Aurora survivors ===
From Calcutta, Testbank sailed via Vizag and Durban to Trinidad. While crossing the South Atlantic she rescued 50 survivors of the US cargo ship Dona Aurora, which an Italian submarine had sunk on Christmas Day. In Trinidad she joined Convoy TAG 35 to Guantánamo in Cuba. Thence Convoy GN 35 took her to New York, where she joined Convoy HX 224 to home waters. She detached from HX 224 to reach Loch Ewe, where she joined Convoy WN 392, which took her around the north of Scotland to Methil. There she joined southbound Convoy FS 1034, from which she detached to reach Hull on 10 February 1943.

=== Final voyage ===
On 2 March 1943 Testbank left Immingham to join northbound Convoy FN 958, which took her to Methil. There she joined Convoy EN 202, which took her to Loch Ewe. She continued to the Firth of Clyde, where she joined Convoy KMS 11G. This took her to Gibraltar, where she joined Convoy TE 20. She detached from TE 20 to reach Algiers, where she seems to have been in port from 3 to 17 April. She briefly joined Convoy ET 18, then called at Melilla, and continued to Gibraltar, where she joined Convoy MKS 12. On 4 May MKS 12 merged with Convoy SL 128 bound for Liverpool. Testbank detached in home waters, and reached Cardiff on 14 May.

Testbank sems to have been in Barry from 21 to 31 May 1943, and then sailed to Milford Haven, where she joined Convoy OS 49KM: a large convoy of 76 merchant ships and 13 escorts. This divided at sea, where Testbank became part of the even larger Convoy KMS 16, which comprised 121 merchant ships and 17 escorts. Ships in KMS 16 were bound for various Mediterranean ports. Testbank detached for Philippeville in Algeria, where she was in port from 19 to 26 June.

On 26 June 1943 Testbank left Philippeville to join Convoy XTG 2, which took her to Gibraltar. There she joined Convoy OS 51 to Freetown, where she joined Convoy SL 134. She detached from SL 134 and crossed the Atlantic independently to Vitória, Brazil, where she loaded iron ore. She left Vitória on 18 August 1943 and re-crossed the Atlantic to Dakar in Senegal, where she was in port from 30 August until 6 September. She joined Convoy SL 136, which on 14 September merged with Convoy MKS 24. The combined convoy reached Liverpool on 25 September.

On 27 October 1943 Testbank left Liverpool with Convoy OS 57, which was a large convoy of 78 ships and nine escorts. On 9 November it divided at sea, with one part forming Convoy KMS 31. Testbank continued with KMS 31 into the Mediterranean, where she detached to call at Augusta, Sicily from 16 to 17 November. She continued to Bari, where she arrived on 19 November with stores for the Allied campaign in Italy.

=== Loss ===
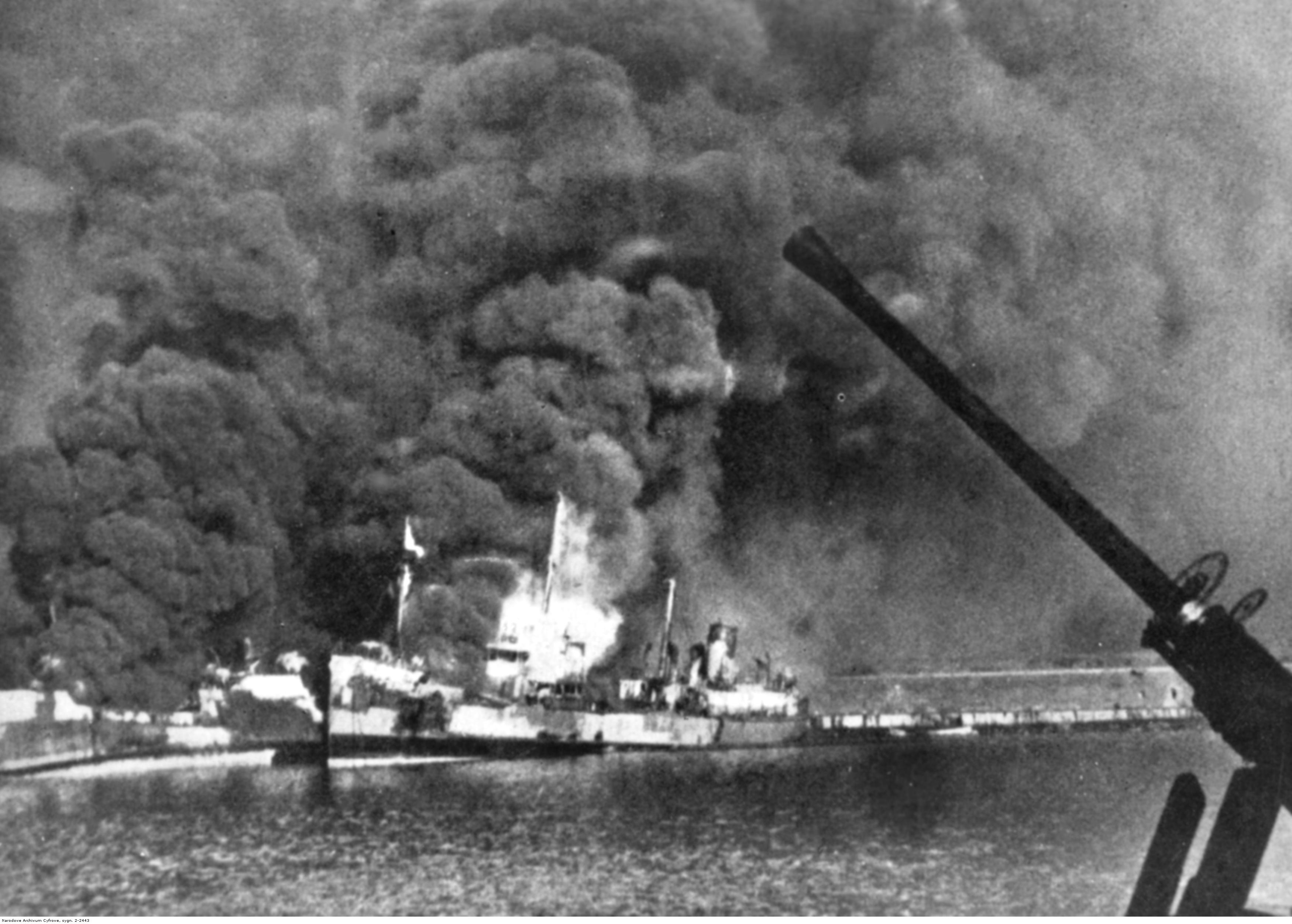
The Liberty ship John Harvey on fire in the air raid on Bari

Testbank was still in Bari on 2 December. Dozens of Allied cargo ships were in port, and at night the harbour was illuminated to discharge supplies around the clock to supply Allied forces fighting the Battle of Monte Cassino. On the evening of 2 December, 105 German Junkers Ju 88 bomber aircraft attacked the port. Dozens of ships were hit. They included the Liberty ships John L. Motley, which was carrying ammunition, and John Harvey, which was secretly carrying mustard gas, forbidden by the 1925 Geneva Protocol. A bunk petrol pipeline on one of the quays was severed and set on fire. Testbank was sunk, with the loss of 70 of her 75 crew and DEMS gunners.

== Bibliography ==
- Lloyd's Register of Shipping (PDF). Vol. II.–Steamers and Motorships of 300 Tons Gross and Over. London: Lloyd's Register of Shipping. 1938 – via Southampton City Council.
- Mercantile Navy List. London. 1938 – via Crew List Index Project.
