= SS Ceramic =

1913 ship sunk in World War II

Coordinates: 40°30′N 40°20′W

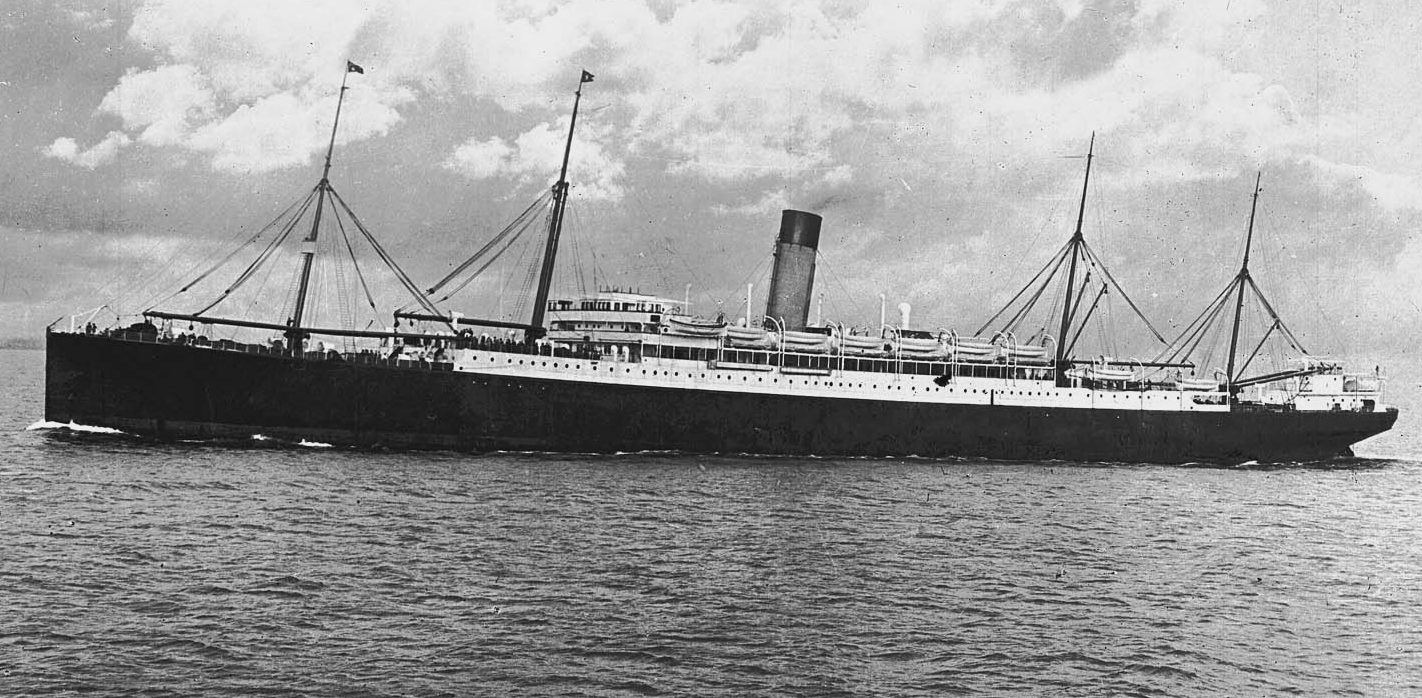
- Ceramic

History

United Kingdom
- Name: Ceramic
- Owner: Ocean Steam Nav Co (1913–34); Shaw, Savill & Albion (1934–42)
- Operator: White Star Line (1913–34); Shaw, Savill & Albion (1934–42)
- Port of registry: Liverpool (1913–34); Southampton (1934–42)
- Route: Liverpool – South Africa – Australia
- Builder: Harland and Wolff, Belfast
- Cost: £436,000
- Yard number: 432
- Launched: 11 December 1912
- Completed: 5 July 1913
- Maiden voyage: 24 July 1913
- Refit: 1920, 1936
- Identification: UK Official number 135474; Code letters JCNK (until 1933); Call sign MCP (1913–30); Call sign GLST (1930–42)
- Fate: Torpedoed and sunk, 6–7 December 1942

General characteristics
- Type: Cargo liner
- Tonnage: 1913–20: 18,481 GRT, 11,729 NRT; 1920–36: 18,495 GRT, 11,718 NRT; 1936–42: 18,713 GRT, 11,582 NRT
- Length: 655.1 ft (199.7 m)
- Beam: 69.4 ft (21.2 m)
- Draught: 47 ft 10 in (14.58 m)
- Depth: 43.8 ft (13.4 m)
- Decks: 3 as built, later 4
- Installed power: 9,000 ihp (6,711 kW) as built, 1,692 NHP after 1936 refit
- Propulsion: 2 × Triple expansion engines; 1 × Low pressure Turbine; 3 Screw propellers
- Speed: 16 knots (30 km/h)
- Capacity: 600 3rd class passengers as built; refrigerated cargo: 321,306 cu ft (9,098 m^{3})
- Crew: 264 crew + 14 DEMS gunners (1942)
- Sensors & processing systems: Wireless direction finding by 1930; Echo sounding device by 1933
- Armament: Two stern-mounted; QF 4.7-inch (120 mm) guns

SS Ceramic was an ocean liner built in Belfast for White Star Line in 1912–13 and operated on the Liverpool – Australia route. Ceramic was the largest ship serving the route until P&O introduced RMS Mooltan in 1923.

In 1934 Shaw, Savill & Albion Line absorbed White Star's Australia service and acquired Ceramic. The liner served as a troopship in both World Wars. In 1942 a U-boat sank her, leaving only one survivor from the 656 people aboard.

This was the first of two ships to be called Ceramic. The second was a Shaw, Savill & Albion refrigerated cargo steamship that was built in England in 1948 and scrapped in 1972.

== Building ==
Harland and Wolff built Ceramic as hull 432 on the Number One slipway of its Belfast yard, launching her on 11 December 1912 and completing her on 5 July 1913. Her total cost was £436,000.

Ceramic's engines were what was called "combination machinery". She had three propellers, with a pair of four-cylinder triple expansion engines driving her port and starboard props and exhaust steam from their low pressure cylinders powering a single low-pressure steam turbine that drove her middle screw. Harland and Wolff and White Star Line had successfully tested this arrangement in 1908 on Laurentic and had since applied it to the three giant Olympic-class ocean liners. Between them Ceramic's three engines were rated at 9,000 ihp (6,711 kW) and gave her a speed of 16 knots (30 km/h).

Ceramic's registered length was 655.1 ft (199.7 m). Her beam was 69.4 ft (21.2 m) and her depth was 43.8 ft (13.4 m). As built, she had three decks and her tonnages were 18,481 GRT and 11,718 NRT. Some of her holds were refrigerated. In later years her refrigerated cargo capacity was cited as 321,340 cu ft (9,099 m^{3}) in 1930 and 321,306 cu ft (9,098 m^{3}) in 1936.

White Star Line registered Ceramic at Liverpool. Her UK official number was 135474 and her code letters were JCNK. She carried wireless telegraphy equipment, operated by the Marconi Company on the standard 300 and 600 metre wavelengths. Her original call sign was MCP.

== White Star service ==
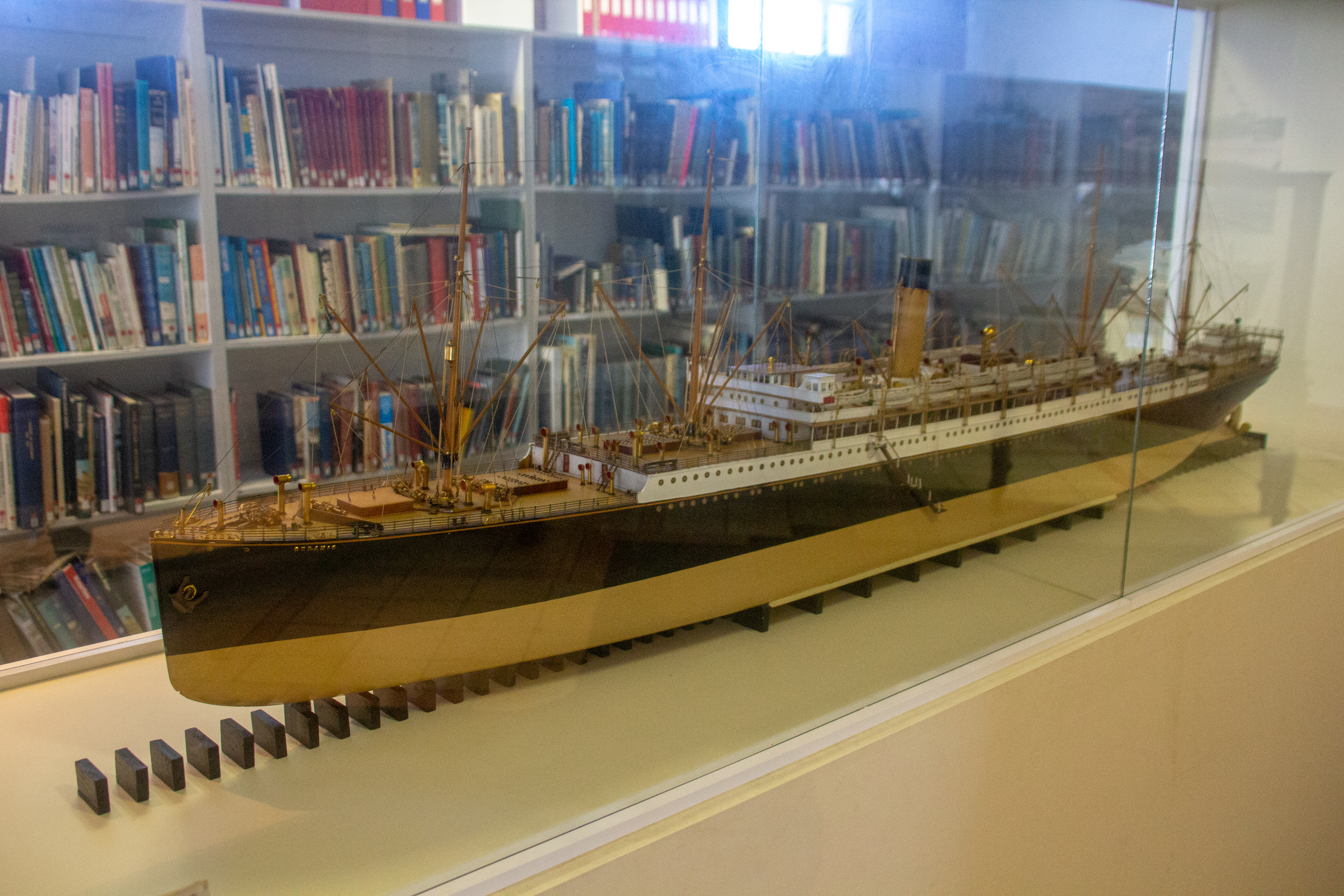
Model at the South African Maritime Museum

Ceramic's maiden voyage began on 24 July 1913 when she left Liverpool for Australia. At the time she was the largest liner on the route between the two countries. In 1914 she was requisitioned for the First Australian Imperial Force as the troopship HMAT (His Majesty's Australian Transport) Ceramic, with the pennant number A40.

She was armed with two stern-mounted QF 4.7-inch (120 mm) naval guns. Her navigation equipment included wireless direction finding by 1930 and echo sounding by 1933.

In 1916 Ceramic took the Territorial Army 25th (County of London) Cyclist Battalion to India, leaving Devonport on 3 February and reaching Bombay on 25 February.

Ceramic survived a number of attacks. In May 1916 she was in the Mediterranean carrying 2,500 troops when two torpedoes from an unidentified attacker missed her. On 9 June 1917 she was in the English Channel when again a torpedo from an unidentified attacker missed her. On 21 July in the North Atlantic off the Canary Islands a surfaced U-boat chased her for 40 minutes. Ceramic fired on the U-boat with her 4.7 inch stern guns and outran her attacker.

In May 1917 Ceramic was transferred from Australian control to the UK Shipping Controller under the Liner Requisition Scheme. In 1919 she was returned to White Star Line and in 1920 Harland and Wolff refitted her as a civilian liner. The refit slightly increased her tonnage to 18,495 GRT. She resumed civilian service on 18 November 1920 when she left Liverpool for Glasgow and Sydney.

Ceramic ran aground on the River Clyde at Glasgow on 12 January 1925. She later was refloated and dry docked.

On 18 December 1930, Ceramic collided with the Pacific Steam Navigation Company's 6,469 GRT cargo motor ship Laguna in the River Thames near Gravesend. Both ships were slightly damaged.

== Shaw, Savill and Albion peacetime service ==
In 1934 White Star merged with Cunard. Ceramic was sold to Shaw, Savill and Albion but kept the same route and name. She started her first voyage for her new owner on 25 August, when she left Liverpool for Brisbane. From 1930 her three-letter wireless call sign was superseded by the four-letter call sign GLST.

In June 1936 Harland and Wolff's yard in Govan, Glasgow began a refit to modernise Ceramic. Her forward bridge deck was glassed in, a verandah café was added aft. The refit changed her tonnages to 18,713 GRT and 11,582 NRT. Despite being 23 years old, she remained a popular ship on the route between the UK and Australia.

As refitted, she had 36 corrugated furnaces with a combined grate area of 725 square feet (67 m^{2}). The furnaces heated six double-ended boilers with a combined heating surface of 30,090 square feet (2,795 m^{2}). The boilers supplied steam at 215 lb_{f}/in^{2} to Ceramic's two triple-expansion engines. Her three engines were now rated at 1,692 NHP. Ceramic resumed service on 15 August 1936.

== Second World War service ==
When the Second World War broke out on 1 September 1939 Ceramic was at Tenerife on her regular route to South Africa and Australia. She continued as scheduled, unescorted, reaching Australia in October. She left Sydney on 1 November and returned unescorted until she reached Freetown, Sierra Leone, where she joined Convoy SL 13F, becoming the convoy vice-commodore's ship. SL 13F left port on 19 December and reached Liverpool on 3 January 1940.

In February 1940 Ceramic was commissioned as a troop ship. She kept her usual route, leaving Liverpool unescorted on 19 February and reaching Sydney on 14 April. She left Sydney for home on 20 April, and after her regular calls in Australia and South Africa she put into Freetown on 2 June. If she was seeking a home-bound convoy she found none, for she sailed the next day unescorted and reached Liverpool on 13 June.

=== Collision with Testbank ===
On 20 July 1940 Ceramic left Liverpool with Convoy OB 186. This dispersed at sea two days later as scheduled.

In the South Atlantic in the small hours of 11 August 1940 the Bank Line cargo ship Testbank sighted Ceramic about a mile and a half ahead. Under wartime navigation regulations both ships were sailing without navigation lights. Ceramic's lookout failed to see Testbank until the two ships were about 350 yards (320 m) from each other. Both ships took avoiding action but were too late to avoid a collision.

About 0200 hrs Testbank rammed Ceramic's starboard bow. The combined speed of the collision was about 25 knots (46 km/h). It shortened the cargo ship's bow by about 20 feet (6 m) and opened a hole about 40 feet (12 m) wide in the liner's Number One Hold, but both ships stayed afloat. Testbank's cargo was 9,000 tons of iron ore, which would have sunk her very quickly if she had shipped enough water. In the event she was able to return to Cape Town under her own power.

As a precaution, Ceramic's 279 passengers were taken off and transferred by boats to the P&O liner RMS Viceroy of India. Ceramic reached Walvis Bay in South West Africa with the aid of a tug and escorted by a Royal Navy warship. She arrived on 16 August and stayed for emergency repairs until 24 September. She reached Cape Town on 27 September and stayed there for almost £50,000 worth of further repairs. On 10 December Ceramic resumed her passage to Australia, reaching Sydney on 18 January 1941. Apart from a visit to Newcastle, New South Wales Ceramic stayed in Sydney until 21 March, when she left for home. She made her usual calls in South Africa at the end of April and reached Liverpool on 28 May.

=== Further war service ===
On 28 or 29 June 1941 Ceramic left Liverpool with Convoy WS 9B, which reached Freetown on 13 July. She continued unescorted via South Africa as usual, reaching Sydney on 4 September, where she stayed until 1 October. She then visited Newcastle and Brisbane before leaving Sydney for home on 12 October. Instead of returning by her usual route Ceramic turned east across the Tasman Sea, called at Wellington, New Zealand 19–27 October and then crossed the Pacific. In November she passed through the Panama Canal and reached Halifax, Nova Scotia. There she joined Convoy HX 163, which left on 3 December and reached Liverpool on 19 December.

In January 1942 Ceramic left Liverpool with Convoy ON 59 until it dispersed as scheduled in the North Atlantic. Because of the threat of enemy attack her Atlantic route from Liverpool to Cape Town was extended westwards. She steamed west unescorted across the North Atlantic to Halifax, arriving on 7 February. On 15 February she left Halifax and under naval escort to Rio de Janeiro, Brazil, arriving on 5 March. She continued unescorted via South Africa to Australia, reaching Sydney on 29 April.

Again she continued east to return home, this time calling at Lyttelton, New Zealand on 2 June before crossing the Pacific and the passing through Panama Canal. In Cristóbal, Colón she joined Convoy Convoy CW 2/1, which left on 3 July and reached Key West on 12 July, where most of its ships including Ceramic joined Convoy KN 119. This left Key West the same day and reached Hampton Roads, Virginia on 17 July. Ceramic continued unescorted, calling at New York 24–27 July and continuing to Halifax where she joined Convoy HX 201. This left on 2 August and reached Liverpool on 14 August. On this voyage Ceramic carried 372 passengers to Liverpool.

=== Loss ===
Approximate position of Ceramic's wreck in the North Atlantic

On 3 November 1942 Ceramic left Liverpool for Australia via Saint Helena and South Africa. She was carrying 377 passengers, 264 crew (including three women), 14 DEMS gunners and 12,362 tons of cargo. 244 of the passengers were military or naval, including at least 145 British Army, 30 Royal Navy, 14 Royal Australian Navy and 12 Royal Marines. 31 of her British Army passengers were QAIMNS nursing sisters. The other 133 passengers were fare-paying civilians, of whom 43 were women and 14 were children, the youngest being a one-year-old baby girl. Six were doctors, five of whom were South African. One passenger was Rudolph Dolmetsch (1906–42), classical musician and composer, then serving as Regimental Bandmaster with the Royal Artillery. There were a total of 655 people on board, of whom 91 were women and children.

Ceramic sailed with Convoy ON 149 until it dispersed as scheduled in the North Atlantic. She then continued unescorted as planned. As on her previous departure in January, she first headed west because of the threat of enemy attack.

At midnight on 6–7 December, in cold weather and rough seas in the mid-Atlantic, U-515 hit Ceramic with a single torpedo. These were followed two or three minutes later by two more that hit Ceramic's engine room, stopping her engines and her electric lighting. The liner radioed a distress signal, which was received by the Emerald-class cruiser HMS Enterprise. The crippled liner stayed afloat and her complement abandoned ship in good order, launching about eight lifeboats all full of survivors.

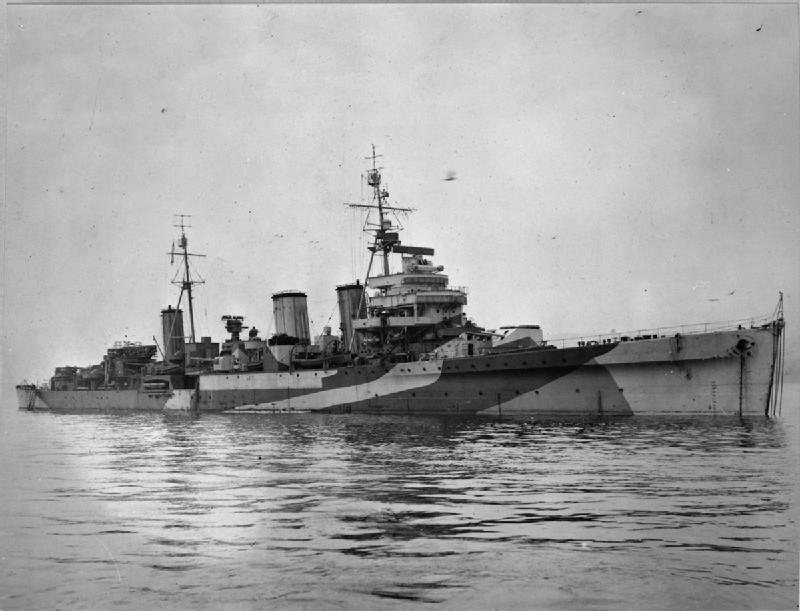
The light cruiser HMS Enterprise received Ceramic's distress signal

About three hours later U-515 fired two more torpedoes, which broke the ship's back and sank her immediately. By now it was very stormy and raining. The heavy sea capsized some of the lifeboats and left many people struggling in the water. Those boats that were not capsized stayed afloat only by constant bailing.

Next morning the BdU ordered U-515 to return to the position of the sinking to find out the ship's destination. About noon the U-boat commander, Kapitänleutnant Werner Henke, decided to rescue the Ceramic's skipper. In heavy seas, he sighted one of the lifeboats and its occupants waved to him. The storm was now almost Force 10 and almost swamping U-515's conning tower, so Henke ordered his crew to make do with the first survivor they could find. This turned out to be Sapper Eric Munday of the Royal Engineers, whom they rescued from the water and took prisoner aboard the submarine.

No other occupants of the lifeboats survived. The storm was too severe for neutral rescue ships from São Miguel Island in the Azores to put to sea. On 9 December the Portuguese Douro-class destroyer NRP Dão was sent to search for survivors, but found none.

Munday was kept prisoner aboard U-515 for a month, including Christmas and New Year, until she completed her patrol. When she returned to Lorient, Brittany on 6 January 1943 he was landed at Lorient U-boat base and sent to Stalag VIII-B in Upper Silesia, where he remained a prisoner of war until 1945.

== See also ==
- List by death toll of ships sunk by submarines

== Bibliography ==
- Crabb, Brian James (2006). Beyond the Call of Duty. The Loss of British Commonwealth Mercantile and Service Women at Sea During the Second World War. Shaun Tyas: Donington. ISBN 1 900289 66-0.
- Dunn, Laurence (1964). Famous liners of the past – Belfast Built. London: Adlard Coles Ltd.
- Hardy, Clare (2012). SS Ceramic – The Untold Story. CreateSpace Independent Publishing Platform.
- Harnack, Edwin P (1930) [1903]. All About Ships & Shipping (3rd ed.). London: Faber and Faber. p. 463.
- The Marconi Press Agency Ltd (1914). The Year Book of Wireless Telegraphy and Telephony. London: The Marconi Press Agency Ltd.
- Slader, John (1988). The Red Duster at War. London: William Kimber & Co Ltd. p. 234. ISBN 0-7183-0679-1.
- Talbot-Booth, EC (1942) [1936]. Ships and the Sea (Seventh ed.). London: Sampson Low, Marston & Co. Ltd. pp. 413, 451.
- Wilson, RM (1956). The Big Ships. London: Cassell & Co.
