= UK–Calcutta Conference =

The UK–Calcutta Conference was a shipping conference established in 1875 to regulate the tea trade. Following the opening of the Suez Canal, the travel time between the United Kingdom and India was halved, resulting in surplus capacity. There followed surplus capacity on the UK-India roots and the conference amounted to a supply regulating mechanism.
