= RMS Viceroy of India =

Former British ocean liner

Coordinates: 36°26′N 0°24′W

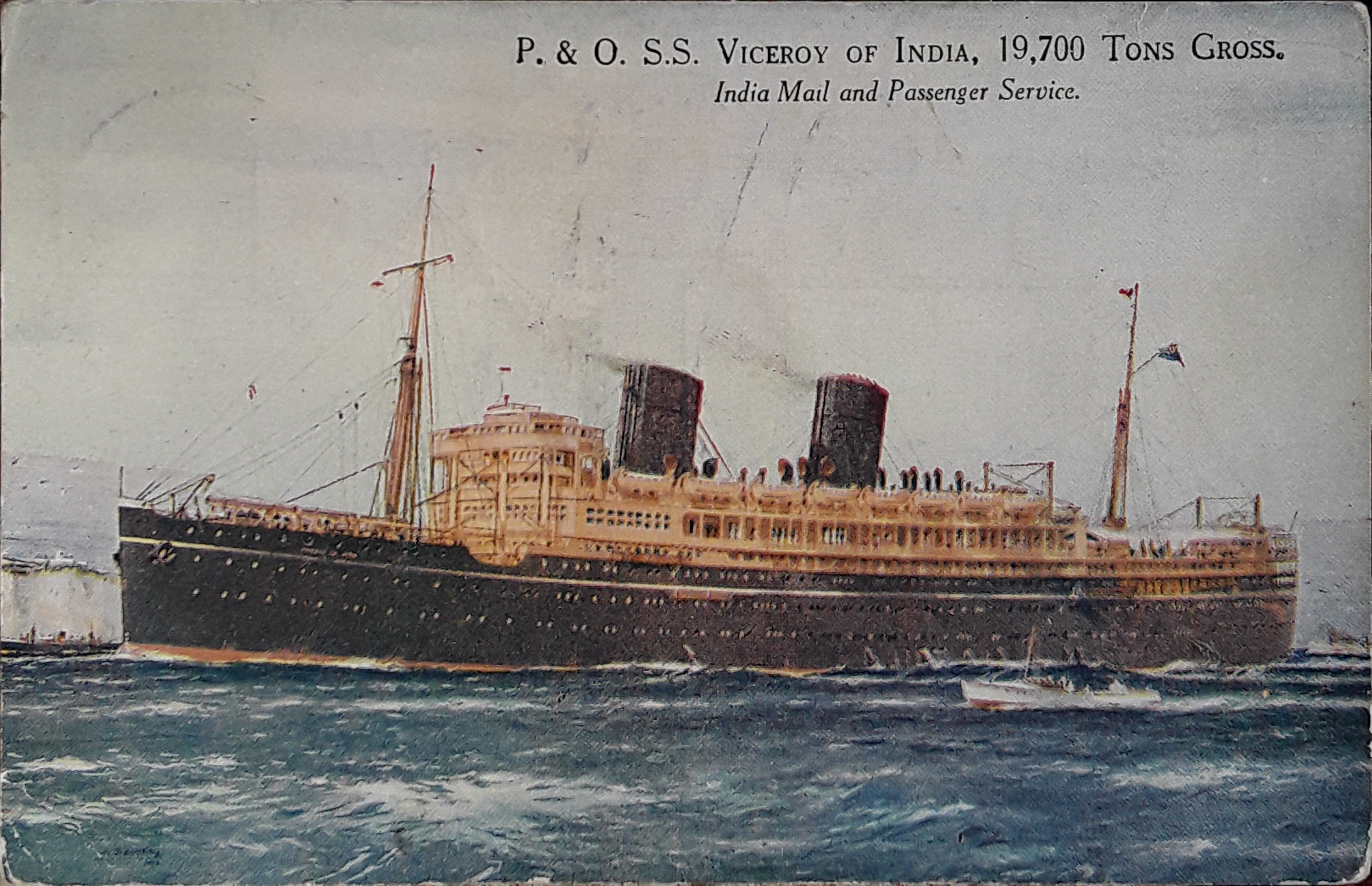
- 1935 postcard of Viceroy of India in civilian service

History

United Kingdom
- Name: RMS Viceroy of India
- Namesake: Viceroy & Governor-General of India
- Owner: P&O
- Operator: P&O Steam Navigation Co
- Port of registry: (United Kingdom) Glasgow
- Route: Tilbury — Bombay
- Builder: Alexander Stephen & Sons, Glasgow, Scotland
- Cost: £1,090,987
- Yard number: 519
- Laid down: April 1927
- Launched: 15 September 1928
- Christened: By Dorothy, Countess of Halifax, wife of the 1st Earl of Halifax, Viceroy of India
- Completed: March 1929
- Maiden voyage: 7 March 1929
- In service: 7 March 1929
- Out of service: 11 November 1942
- Home port: Tilbury
- Identification: UK official number 160238; code letters LCTV (until 1933); call sign GLVX (from 1930)
- Fate: Sunk, 11 November 1942

General characteristics
- Type: Ocean liner
- Tonnage: 19,648 GRT; 14,069 tonnage under deck; 10,069 NRT; 9,180 LT DWT
- Length: 586.1 ft (178.6 m) moulded; 612.3 ft (186.6 m) o/a
- Beam: 76.2 ft (23.2 m)
- Draught: 28 ft 2.75 in (8.60 m)
- Depth: 41.5 ft (12.6 m)
- Decks: 5
- Installed power: 3,565 NHP; 17,000 shp (13,000 kW)
- Propulsion: Turbo-electric transmission; twin screw
- Speed: 19 knots (35 km/h; 22 mph) or 20 knots (37 km/h; 23 mph)
- Capacity: Passengers: 415 1st class; 258 2nd class; Cargo: 217,752 cu ft (6,166 m^{3})
- Crew: 14 officers; 19 petty officers; 59 seamen; 18 engineers; 53 firemen; 248 pursers and stewards; 1 surgeon and 1 assistant; (413 total)
- Sensors & processing systems: direction finding equipment

RMS Viceroy of India was an ocean liner of P&O. She was a British Royal Mail Ship on the Tilbury–Bombay route and was named after the Viceroy of India. In World War II, she was converted to and used as a troopship. She was sunk in the Mediterranean Sea in November 1942 by German submarine U-407.

== Building ==
P&O ordered the ship from Alexander Stephen & Sons, Glasgow in 1927. She was originally to be called Taj Mahal, after the 17th-century mausoleum of Mumtaz Mahal in Agra. She was laid down in April 1927, launched in September 1928 and completed in March 1929. She cost £1,090,987

She had six water-tube boilers with a combined heating surface of 32,500 square feet (3,019 m^{2}) that supplied steam at 400 lb_{f}/in^{2} to two turbo generators. These supplied current to electric motors with a combined rating of 3,565 NHP that drove twin screw propellers. British Thomson-Houston (BT-H) of Rugby, Warwickshire built the turbo-generators and motors.

Each turbo-generator ran at 2,690–3,110 RPM, producing three-phase current at 2,720 volts and rated at 900 kW. Each propeller shaft was driven by two three-phase 3,150 volt electric motors running at 109 RPM and giving 8,500 shp (6,300 kW) per shaft. At reduced power of up to 11,600 shp (8,700 kW) only one turbo-generator was needed to supply current to both motors, thus maximising fuel economy.

Viceroy of India's indoor swimming pool

The accommodation aboard was considered luxurious by the standards of the era. The first class state rooms were especially so, but standards were high in all classes on this ship. All cabins were single berth with interconnecting doors, with extra rooms for servants who often travelled with colonial families. Her onboard amenities also included the then unusual luxury of an indoor swimming pool. Much of the interior decoration was designed by Elsie Mackay, youngest daughter of James Mackay, 1st Earl of Inchcape, who was the chairman of P&O from 1914 until his death in 1932.

Viceroy of India carried cargo as well as passengers, and her holds were refrigerated for carrying perishables.

== Launch and commissioning ==
The ship was launched as Viceroy of India on 15 September 1928 by Dorothy, Countess of Halifax, the wife of the Viceroy of India, E. F. L. Wood, 1st Earl of Halifax. The name had been changed to avoid offending Indians, particularly Muslims, for whom the Taj Mahal mausoleum is sacred.

Fitting out at Shieldhall Wharf, Glasgow, began on 8 January 1929. Viceroy of India was finished in P&O's traditional colours: her hull black with a white band, her boot topping red, her upper works and lifeboats buff, her large vents black, her small vents buff and her two funnels black.

During fitting out she was damaged amidships by Donaldson South American Line's 7,131 GRT cargo ship Corinaldo, which was trying to dock in poor visibility. However, by 17 February Viceroy of India was ready for sea trials, on which she averaged 19.6 knots (36.3 km/h). She was completed in March 1929.

== P&O turbo-electric ships ==
Viceroy of India was Britain's first large turbo-electric passenger ship. At about the same time as she was built, P&O also had RMS Mooltan's performance increased by the addition of BT-H turbo generators and propulsion motors to supplement her quadruple-expansion engines.

P&Os first experiences of turbo-electric propulsion led the company to specify the same form of transmission for a pair of liners that it ordered in 1930: RMS Strathnaver (completed in 1931) and RMS Strathaird (completed in 1932). Each "Strath" was only about 2,600 GRT bigger than Viceroy of India but they produced about 77% more power, which made them about 3 knots (5.6 km/h) faster than Viceroy of India.

== Civilian service ==
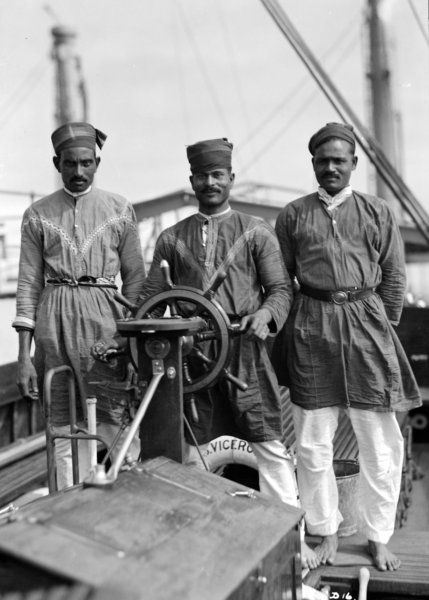
Three of Viceroy of India's Lascar crew

Viceroy of India was handed over to P&O on 7 March 1929 and made her maiden voyage on the Indian mail route. Viceroy of India was also suited for leisure cruises, which she made every year until the outbreak of World War II in September 1939.

On 9 August 1929, she collided with the tug Olanda at Venice, Italy. Olanda was beached after the collision.

On 23 November 1929 Viceroy of India rescued 25 crew members from the Italian cargo steamship Maria Luisa, which sank in the eastern Mediterranean off the coast of Egypt.

In February 1930 Viceroy of India was berthed in Bombay when the 6,070 GRT British India Line ship Warfield collided with her. The collision pushed the liner against a dockside crane, which she demolished. Viceroy of India herself escaped serious damage.

Later in 1930 Viceroy of India twice assisted the Greek cargo steamship Theodoros Bulgaris in the Bay of Biscay. In September she stood by when Theodoros Bulgaris' cargo of grain shifted in storms and the Greek merchantman's crew were transferred to another vessel. On 31 December 1930 Theodoros Bulgararis sank, and Viceroy of India rescued all of the crew.

In September 1932, Viceroy of India set a new record time between London and Bombay of 17 days, 1 hour, 42 minutes.

On 5 September 1935 the Cunard White Star liner Doric and the Chargeurs Réunis cargo steamship Formigny collided off Cape Finisterre. Doric stayed afloat but her 736 passengers were transferred to other ships as a precaution; 241 of them were transferred to Viceroy of India.

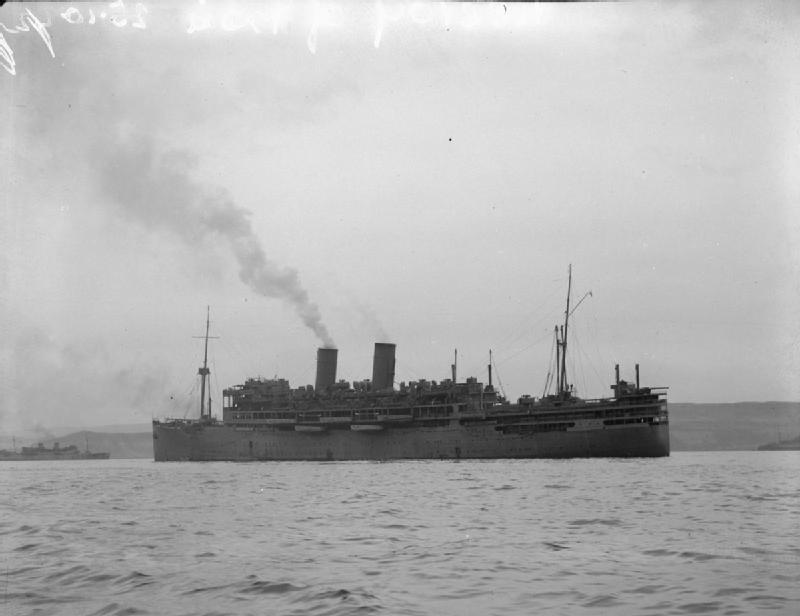
Viceroy of India as a troopship on the River Clyde in World War II

In February 1939, Viceroy of India cruised to the South Atlantic, where she became the first P&O liner to visit the island of Tristan da Cunha.

On 11 August 1940 the Bank Line cargo ship Testbank collided with the Shaw, Savill & Albion liner Ceramic in the South Atlantic off Walvis Bay. Both ships stayed afloat, but Ceramic's 279 passengers were transferred to Viceroy of India as a precaution.

== War service and sinking ==
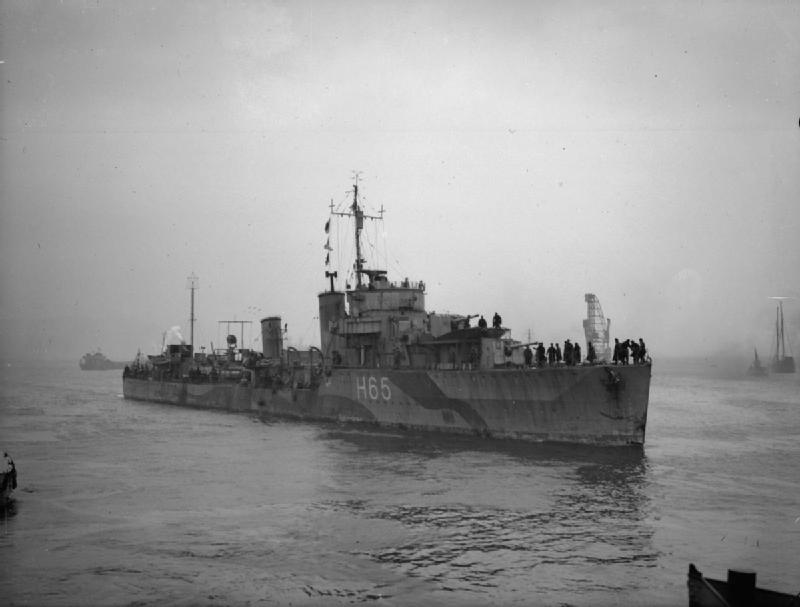
After U-407 torpedoed Viceroy of India, HMS Boadicea towed the troopship. When Viceroy sank, the destroyer rescued 450 people.

On 12 November 1940 the Ministry of War Transport requisitioned Viceroy of India to be a troopship. She returned to the River Clyde for the conversion.

In 1942 Viceroy of India sailed in Convoy KMF-1A carrying Allied troops from Britain to invade French North Africa in Operation Torch. Early on 11 November 1942 she was returning empty from Algiers bound for Gibraltar. At 0524 hrs she was about 34 miles (55 km) northwest of Oran when German submarine U-407 fired a spread of four torpedoes at her. Two hit the ship, killing four crew members. At 0531 hrs U-407 fired a stern-tube torpedo at her but missed. The B-class destroyer HMS Boadicea took Viceroy of India in tow but she sank stern first and Boadicea rescued all 432 surviving crew and 22 passengers.

== Notes ==
Approximate position of Viceroy of India's wreck in the Mediterranean off Algeria
