= Ernst-Ulrich Brüller =

"German U-boat commander (1917–1997)"

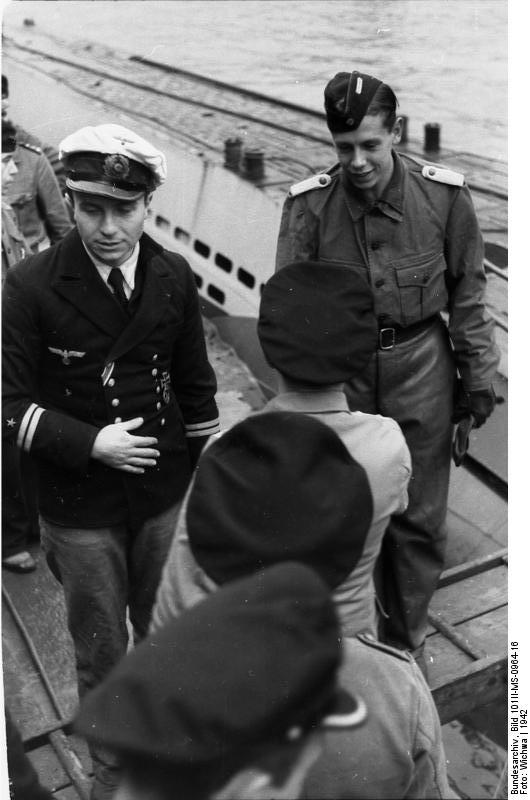
- Kapitänleutnant Ernst-Ulrich Brüller (left), the commander of German submarine U-407 in La Spezia, Italy in 1942
- Born: 23 September 1917; Opole, Kingdom of Prussia
- Died: 28 February 1997 (aged 79); Germany
- Military career
- Allegiance: Nazi Germany
- Branch: Kriegsmarine
- Service years: 1936–1945
- Rank: Kapitänleutnant
- Units: 9th U-boat Flotilla; 29th U-boat Flotilla
- Commands: U-407
- Conflicts: World War II: Battle of the Atlantic; Battle of the Mediterranean
- Awards: Iron Cross 2nd Class; U-boat War Badge; Iron Cross 1st Class; Bronze Medal of Military Valor; U-boat Front Clasp

Ernst-Ulrich Brüller (23 September 1917 – 28 February 1997) was a German U-boat commander during World War II. Under Brüller's command, the submarine U-407 was credited with sinking one Allied ship totaling 19,627 gross register tons (GRT), and damaging two Allied warships, HMS Newfoundland and HMS Birmingham for a further 17,900 GRT.

== Biography ==
=== Early career ===
Ernst-Ulrich Brüller was born on 23 September 1917 in Opole (German: Oppeln), then part of Upper Silesia in the Kingdom of Prussia. Brüller joined the Kriegsmarine on 3 April 1936 as an Offiziersanwärter (officer candidate) and trained aboard the training ship Gorch Fock from 14 June 1936 to 12 September 1936 before becoming a Seekadett on 10 September 1936 and being stationed aboard the cruiser Emden from 13 September 1936 until 30 March 1937. Brüller passed the formal ensign exam at Mürwik Naval School and was promoted to the aspirant rank of Fähnrich zur See on 1 May 1937. From 28 November 1937 to 2 March 1938 Brüller underwent more training as an ensign before being attached to the 1st U-boat training flotilla in Danzig (Gdańsk) as an adjutant. Brüller was promoted to the rank of Oberfähnrich zur See on 1 July 1938 before being formally commissioned as a Leutnant zur See on 1 October 1938.

From March to April 1940 Brüller was the First Watch Officer (1WO) of U-4 under Kapitänleutnant Hans-Peter Hinsch. From May 1940 to 15 November 1940 Brüller was the Second Watch Officer (2WO) aboard U-28 under Kapitänleutnant Friedrich Guggenberger. Brüller would later be Guggenberger's First Watch Officer aboard U-28 before being placed as the acting commander of U-7, a training vessel. Brüller underwent U-boat commander training courses in Memel with the 24th U-boat Flotilla from 15 February 1940 until 20 March 1940. From 21 March 1940 to 23 September 1941 Brüller commanded U-23, a training submarine.

=== U-407 ===
On 1 October 1940 Brüller was commissioned as Oberleutnant zur See and given command of U-407, Brüller would command U-407 for the majority of the submarine's service from 18 December 1941 to 14 January 1944. As commander of U-407 Brüller sank one Allied ship, RMS Viceroy of India totaling 19,627 gross register tons (GRT), and damaged two light cruisers, HMS Newfoundland and HMS Birmingham, for a further 17,900 GRT. On 1 April 1943 Brüller was promoted to the rank of Kapitänleutnant. During this time U-407 was part of the 9th U-boat Flotilla and the 29th U-boat Flotilla.

=== Later career ===
Following his service with U-407 Brüller was placed in command 1st Submarine Training Division (1. U-Lehrdivision) in Hamburg-Finkenwerder. Brüller surrendered on 8 May 1945 to British forces and became a prisoner of war.

== Later life ==
Brüller survived the war. He died on 28 February 1997 at the age of 79 in Germany.

== Awards ==
- Iron Cross 2nd Class - 15 April 1940.
- U-boat War Badge - 8 July 1940.
- Iron Cross 1st Class - 16 November 1940.
- Bronze Medal of Military Valor - 29 March 1943.
- U-boat Front Clasp in Bronze - 17 October 1944.
