= German submarine U-407 =

German type VII C world war II submarine

History

Nazi Germany
- Name: U-407
- Ordered: 16 October 1939
- Builder: Danziger Werft, Danzig
- Yard number: 108
- Laid down: 12 September 1940
- Launched: 16 August 1941
- Commissioned: 18 December 1941
- Fate: Sunk on 19 September 1944

General characteristics
- Class & type: Type VIIC submarine
- Displacement: 769 tonnes (757 long tons) surfaced; 871 t (857 long tons) submerged
- Length: 67.10 m (220 ft 2 in) o/a; 50.50 m (165 ft 8 in) pressure hull
- Beam: 6.20 m (20 ft 4 in) o/a; 4.70 m (15 ft 5 in) pressure hull
- Draught: 4.74 m (15 ft 7 in)
- Installed power: 2,800–3,200 PS (2,100–2,400 kW; 2,800–3,200 bhp) (diesels); 750 PS (550 kW; 740 shp) (electric)
- Propulsion: 2 shafts; 2 × diesel engines; 2 × electric motors
- Speed: 17.7 knots (32.8 km/h; 20.4 mph) surfaced; 7.6 knots (14.1 km/h; 8.7 mph) submerged
- Range: 8,500 nmi (15,700 km; 9,800 mi) at 10 knots (19 km/h; 12 mph) surfaced; 80 nmi (150 km; 92 mi) at 4 knots (7.4 km/h; 4.6 mph) submerged
- Test depth: 230 m (750 ft); Crush depth: 250–295 m (820–968 ft)
- Complement: 4 officers, 40–56 enlisted
- Armament: 5 × 53.3 cm (21 in) torpedo tubes (4 bow, 1 stern); 14 × torpedoes; 1 × 8.8 cm (3.46 in) deck gun (220 rounds); 1 × 3.7 cm (1.5 in) Flak M42 AA gun; 2 × 2 cm (0.79 in) C/30 AA guns

Service record
- Part of: 5th U-boat Flotilla; 18 December 1941 – 31 August 1942; 9th U-boat Flotilla; 1 September – 30 November 1942; 29th U-boat Flotilla; 1 December 1942 – 19 September 1944
- Identification codes: M 08 300
- Commanders: Kptlt. Ernst-Ulrich Brüller; 18 December 1941 – 14 January 1944; Oblt.z.S. Hubertus Korndörfer; 14 January 1944 – 8 September 1944; Oblt.z.S. Hans Kolbus; 9 September 1944 – 19 September 1944
- Operations: 12 patrols: 1st patrol: 15 August – 9 October 1942; 2nd patrol: 2 – 26 November 1942; 3rd patrol: 17 January 1943 – 26 February 1943; 4th patrol: a. 21 April – 8 May 1943; b. 12 – 28 May 1943; 5th patrol: 7 – 30 July 1943; 6th patrol: 17 August – 8 September 1943; 7th patrol: 9 – 12 September 1943; 8th patrol: 11 November – 12 December 1943; 9th patrol: 29 January – 12 March 1944; 10th patrol: 13 April – 10 May 1944; 11th patrol: 21 August – 4 September 1944; 12th patrol: 9 – 19 September 1944
- Victories: 3 merchant ships sunk (26,892 GRT); 1 merchant ship total loss (7,176 GRT); 1 merchant ship damaged (6,207 GRT); 2 warships damaged (17,900 tons)

German submarine U-407 was a Type VIIC U-boat built for Nazi Germany's Kriegsmarine during World War II. She was laid down on 12 September 1940 by Danziger Werft, Danzig as yard number 108, launched on 16 August 1941 and commissioned on 18 December 1941 under Oberleutnant zur See Ernst-Ulrich Brüller.

== Design ==
German Type VIIC submarines were preceded by the shorter Type VIIB submarines. U-407 had a displacement of 769 tonnes (757 long tons) when at the surface and 871 tonnes (857 long tons) while submerged. She had a total length of 67.10 m (220 ft 2 in), a pressure hull length of 50.50 m (165 ft 8 in), a beam of 6.20 m (20 ft 4 in), a height of 9.60 m (31 ft 6 in), and a draught of 4.74 m (15 ft 7 in). The submarine was powered by two Germaniawerft F46 four-stroke, six-cylinder supercharged diesel engines producing a total of 2,800 to 3,200 metric horsepower (2,060 to 2,350 kW; 2,760 to 3,160 shp) for use while surfaced, two Siemens-Schuckert GU 343/38–8 double-acting electric motors producing a total of 750 metric horsepower (550 kW; 740 shp) for use while submerged. She had two shafts and two 1.23 m (4 ft) propellers. The boat was capable of operating at depths of up to 230 metres (750 ft).

The submarine had a maximum surface speed of 17.7 knots (32.8 km/h; 20.4 mph) and a maximum submerged speed of 7.6 knots (14.1 km/h; 8.7 mph). When submerged, the boat could operate for 80 nautical miles (150 km; 92 mi) at 4 knots (7.4 km/h; 4.6 mph); when surfaced, she could travel 8,500 nautical miles (15,700 km; 9,800 mi) at 10 knots (19 km/h; 12 mph). U-407 was fitted with five 53.3 cm (21 in) torpedo tubes (four fitted at the bow and one at the stern), fourteen torpedoes, one 8.8 cm (3.46 in) SK C/35 naval gun, (220 rounds), one 3.7 cm (1.5 in) Flak M42 and two 2 cm (0.79 in) C/30 anti-aircraft guns. The boat had a complement of between forty-four and sixty.

== Service history ==
The boat's career began with training at 5th U-boat Flotilla on 18 December 1941, followed by active service on 1 September 1942 as part of the 9th Flotilla. However, within 3 months, she transferred for operations in the Mediterranean with 29th Flotilla for the remainder of her service.

In twelve patrols she sank three merchant ships – including the 19,627 GRT RMS Viceroy of India on 11 November 1942 – for a total of 26,892 gross register tons (GRT), one merchant ship damaged of 6,207 GRT, two warships damaged (17,900 tons) and one more ship a total loss 7,176 GRT; however, some sources claim that the damaging of HMS Newfoundland is to be attributed to the Italian submarine Ascianghi.

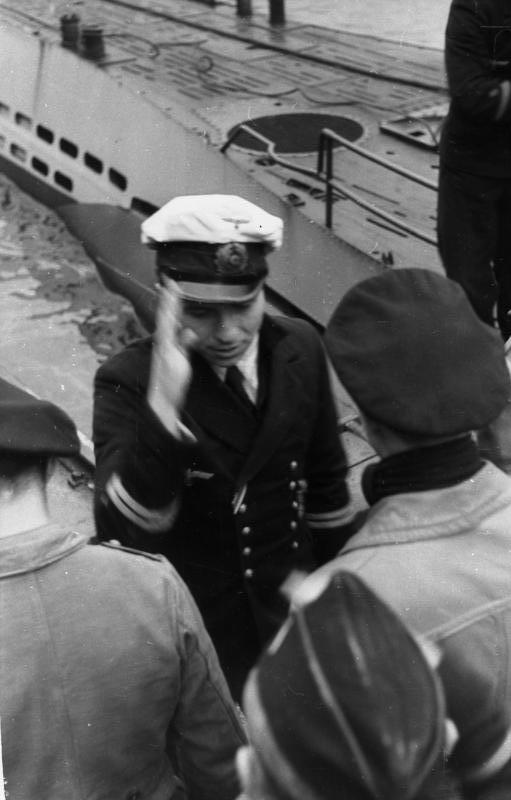
1942: Ernst-Ulrich Brüller on U-407 (La Spezia)

=== Wolfpacks ===
U-407 took part in four wolfpacks, namely:

- Vorwärts (25 August – 26 September 1942)
- Tiger (26 – 28 September 1942)
- Delphin (4 – 10 November 1942)
- Wal (10 – 15 November 1942)

=== Fate ===
U-407 was sunk on 19 September 1944 in the Mediterranean in position, south of Milos, 36°27′N 24°33′E, by depth charges from HMS Troubridge, HMS Terpsichore and ORP Garland. There were five crew members killed.

== Summary of raiding history ==
Date	Ship Name	Nationality	Tonnage (Note: Merchant ship tonnages are in gross register tons. Military vessels are listed by tons displacement.)	Fate
11 November 1942	Viceroy of India	United Kingdom	19,627	Sunk
23 July 1943	HMS Newfoundland	Royal Navy	8,800	Damaged
28 November 1943	HMS Birmingham	Royal Navy	9,100	Damaged
27 February 1944	Rod el Farag	Egypt	55	Sunk
29 February 1944	Ensis	United Kingdom	6,207	Damaged
16 April 1944	Meyer London	United States	7,210	Sunk
16 April 1944	Thomas G. Masaryk	United States	7,176	Total loss

== See also ==
- Mediterranean U-boat Campaign (World War II)

== Bibliography ==
- Busch, Rainer; Röll, Hans-Joachim (1999). German U-boat commanders of World War II : a biographical dictionary. Translated by Brooks, Geoffrey. London, Annapolis, Md: Greenhill Books, Naval Institute Press. ISBN 1-55750-186-6.
- Busch, Rainer; Röll, Hans-Joachim (1999). Deutsche U-Boot-Verluste von September 1939 bis Mai 1945 [German U-boat losses from September 1939 to May 1945]. Der U-Boot-Krieg (in German). Vol. IV. Hamburg, Berlin, Bonn: Mittler. ISBN 3-8132-0514-2.
- Gröner, Erich; Jung, Dieter; Maass, Martin (1991). U-boats and Mine Warfare Vessels. German Warships 1815–1945. Vol. 2. Translated by Thomas, Keith; Magowan, Rachel. London: Conway Maritime Press. ISBN 0-85177-593-4.
- Sharpe, Peter (1998). U-Boat Fact File. Great Britain: Midland Publishing. ISBN 1-85780-072-9.
