= Bank Line =

Former British commercial shipping line

Bank Line house flag

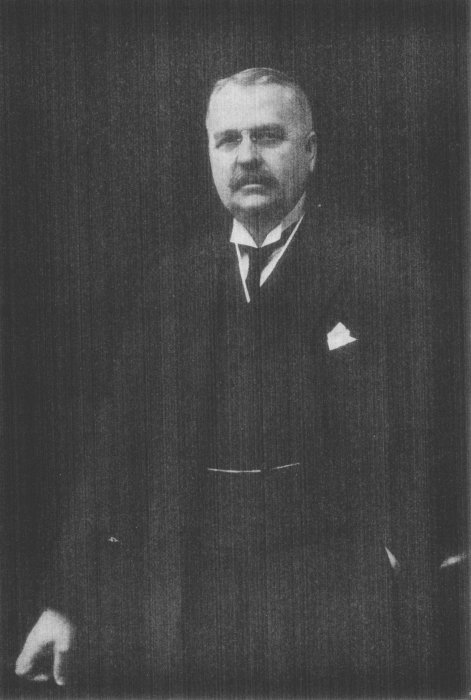
Andrew Weir, 1st Baron Inverforth

The Bank Line was a British commercial shipping line that was established in 1905 by Andrew Weir. The company was sold to the Swire Group in 2003, eventually ceasing operations in 2009. Initially a tramp operator of sailing vessels, it developed into a major company operating shipping lines all over the world.

== History ==
Andrew Weir, from Glasgow, Scotland, who came from a family of cork merchants, became a ship owner in 1885 when he purchased a barque, already known as the Willowbank. He then rapidly developed a fleet of sailing vessels that became the largest fleet sailing under the British flag. Weir purchased his first steamship in 1896. Named the Duneric, this was the first of the vessels that he had had built not to have the suffix “bank”, which was not used for his steamships. Bank Line Ltd formally came into operation in 1905, when the Head Office was moved to London, close to the Baltic Exchange, where shipping contracts are exchanged. Until then most of the ships owned by Weir had been operated by one-ship companies. By 1917, Weir had sold the last of his windjammers and the use of “bank” in the vessel's name had temporarily died out. Weir purchased 43 steamships between 1896 and World War I.

Starting out in business as a tramp operator of sailing ships, Andrew Weir saw the opportunity presented by the introduction of steamships to enter liner shipping conferences. Routes developed included India to Africa and South Africa to South-East Asia. The Bank Line's Pacific Islands service began initially as a charter business for Lever Brothers, a major soap manufacturer, carrying copra and coconut oil to Lever's factories in Europe. Ships on this service were among the few Bank Line vessels that regularly visited the United Kingdom and this fact, plus the exotic locations visited, made the route popular with the Bank Line's sailors. Eight further steamships were purchased after World War I to use on the liner routes. In 1919 the company also took over the management of the fleet of the British-Mexican Petroleum Company, eventually operating 12 steam tankers.

After World War I, Bank Line ordered 18 oil-fired twin-screw motor vessels from Harland & Wolff in Glasgow and these went into service between 1924 and 1926. All had “bank” as a suffix to the name: some were named after trees, such as Elmbank and Olivebank, while others took their names from Scottish geographical features, such as Clydebank. The first ship delivered was the Inverbank and this gave its name to the whole class of vessels. Eight of these were lost during the Second World War and one, the Speybank was captured and used as a minelayer. The last of the class was scrapped in 1960. Bank Line also ordered 12 new steamships and motorships from Workman, Clark and Company in Belfast between 1928 and 1934. Most of these also had the “bank” name suffix. The three that didn't were passenger ships that often carried indentured Indian labourers to work on sugar plantations. In addition to these new vessels the Line also bought-in a number of existing ships. From 1934 to 1940 a further 19 cargo ships were delivered by Harland & Wolff, Workman Clark, William Doxford & Sons and John Readhead & Sons.

Many Bank Line vessels were sunk in World War II and by the end of the war the Line was left with 31 ships, of which six were steamships. Many of the vessels were by then over 20 years old. Six new ones were added between 1952 and 1955, but the major expansion began in 1957. The new ships, which were mainly 12,000dwt tweendeck vessels, were larger and faster and consisted of 24 vessels from Doxford's, 23 from Harland & Wolff in Belfast and 2 from Swan Hunter on the River Tyne. All were built to standard Bank Line designs. From 1963 a further 36 vessels of 15,000+dwt were built in the same shipyards. The last Bank Line order was placed in 1977 and delivered in 1979.

In the 1950s Bank Line was heavily involved in the liner trade but also continued to carry out tramping. Many of the liner services operated through Calcutta, with routes to eastern, southern and western Africa, Argentina and the west coast of South America. Other routes included the United States Gulf to Australia and New Zealand and the Papua New Guinea and Pacific Islands to Europe service. Durban was an important centre as the Oriental African Line resumed service after the war and began to visit Japan again and was extended to serve Taiwan, the Philippines, East Malaysia, and Thailand. Over time the Bank Line began to suffer from the movement towards container shipping and also changes to trading circumstances such as the decline in jute exports through Calcutta, the sale of Papua New Guinea copra to Japan rather than Europe, and the boycott of trading with South Africa by India because of apartheid. In 1979 the company took delivery of its last six multipurpose ships, known as the “Fish” class because they were all named after fish, such as Troutbank and Roachbank. By the second half of the 1970s, the Bank Line's business was centered on the US Gulf, involving liner sailings from ports such as Houston and New Orleans to South Africa, Australia and New Zealand, the UK and the rest of Europe. For a time the South Pacific trade was consolidated into the Australian and New Zealand routes but this proved inefficient. In 1977 the Bank Line partnered with the Shaw, Savill & Albion Line to form the Bank and Savill Line to provide container services between the US Gulf and Australia and New Zealand. Three container vessels were commissioned for this route. Difficulties were experienced because of the incompatible container systems used by southern hemisphere and USA shippers.

In the 1990s changes were made to the South Pacific route which became a westbound round-the-world service using both the Suez Canal and the Panama Canal. In 1995 the Bank Line bought four SA-15 type ships that had been built in Finland and chartered two others. One of these, the Boularibank, was attacked by Somalian pirates at the entrance to the Gulf of Aden in April 2009. Unable to outrun the attackers, the vessel carried out evasive manoeuvres while under fire. It was eventually rescued by a destroyer of the Russian Navy. The captain was awarded the Merchant Navy Medal for exceptional bravery during the attack.

== Gallery ==
Ships of Bank Line

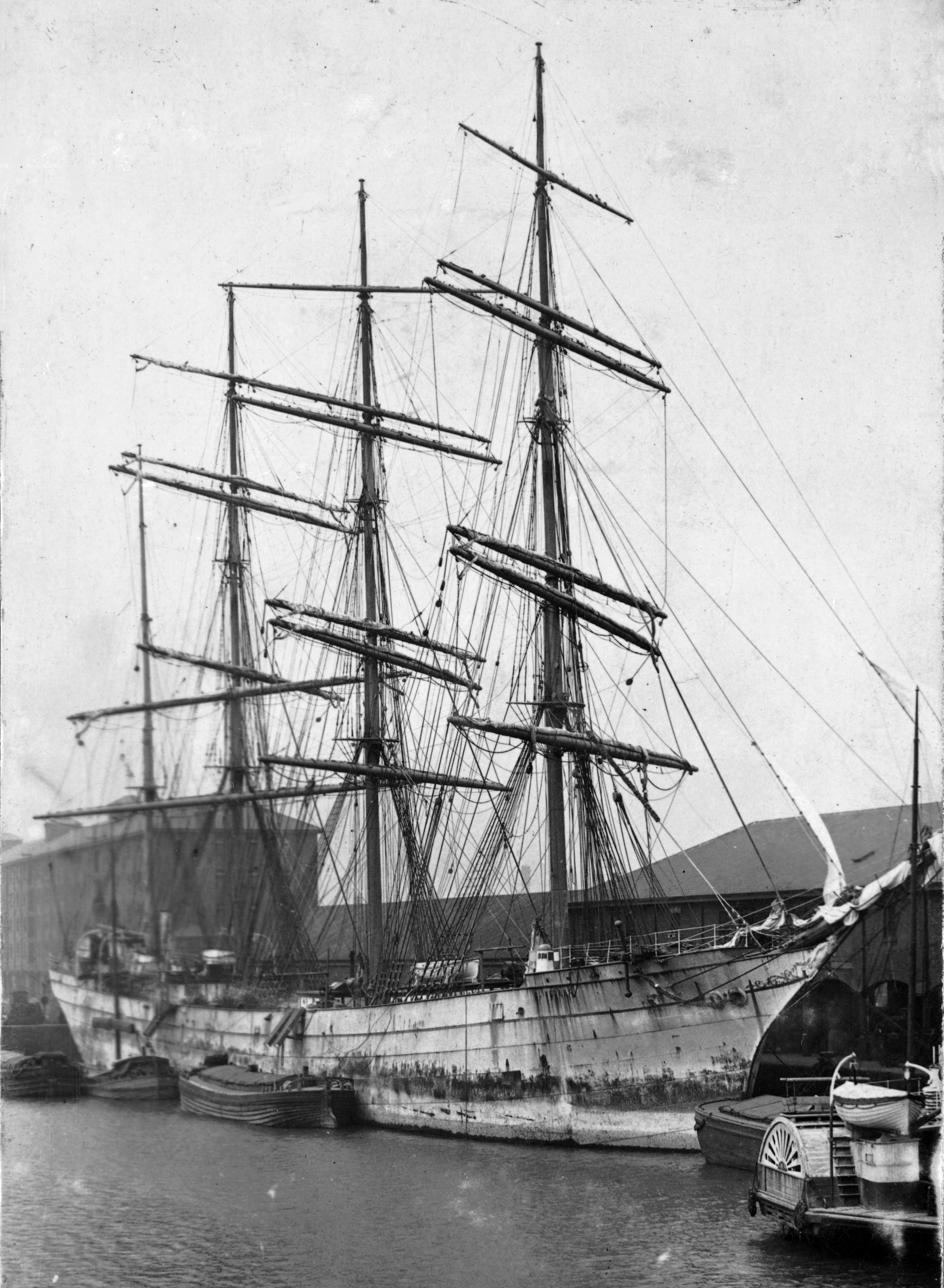
The Olivebank of 1892

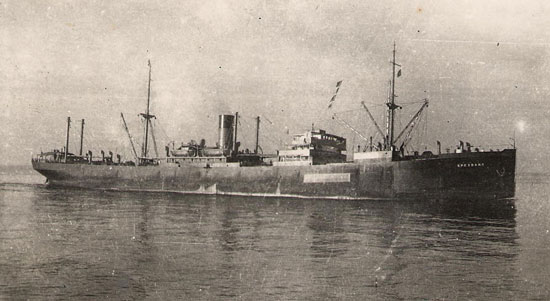
The Speybank, captured by the Germans in WW2 and renamed Doggerbank

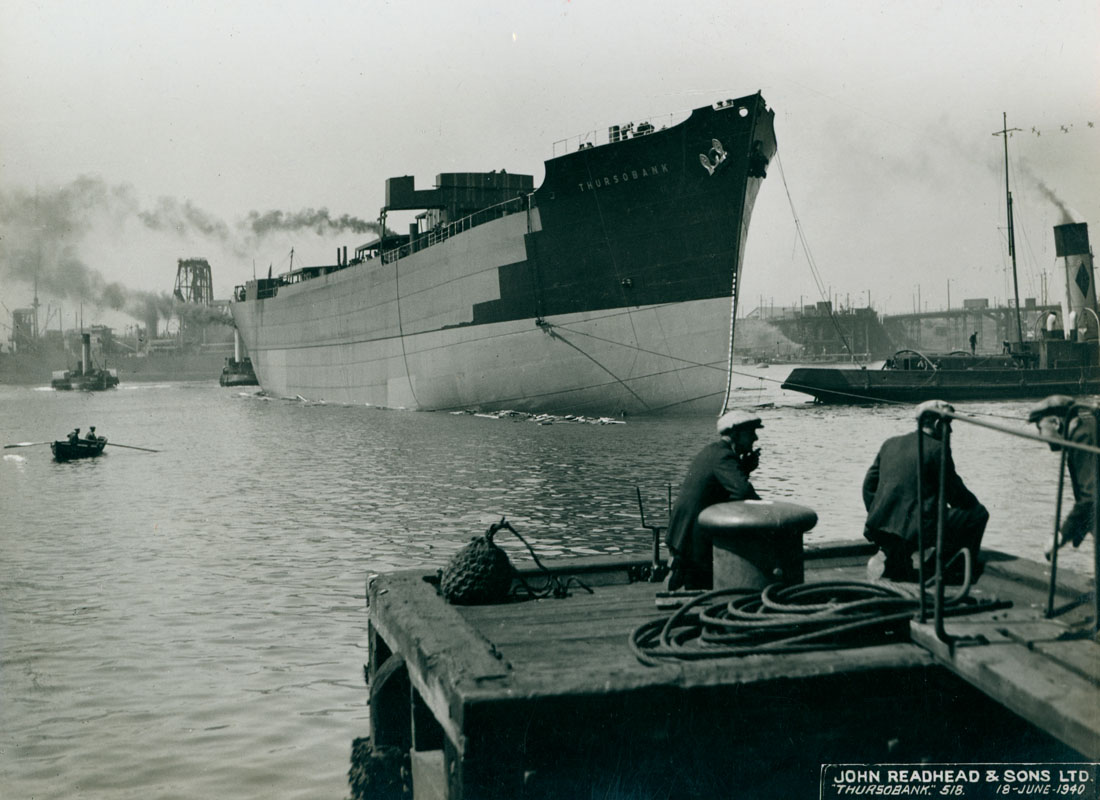
Launch of the Thursobank in 1940

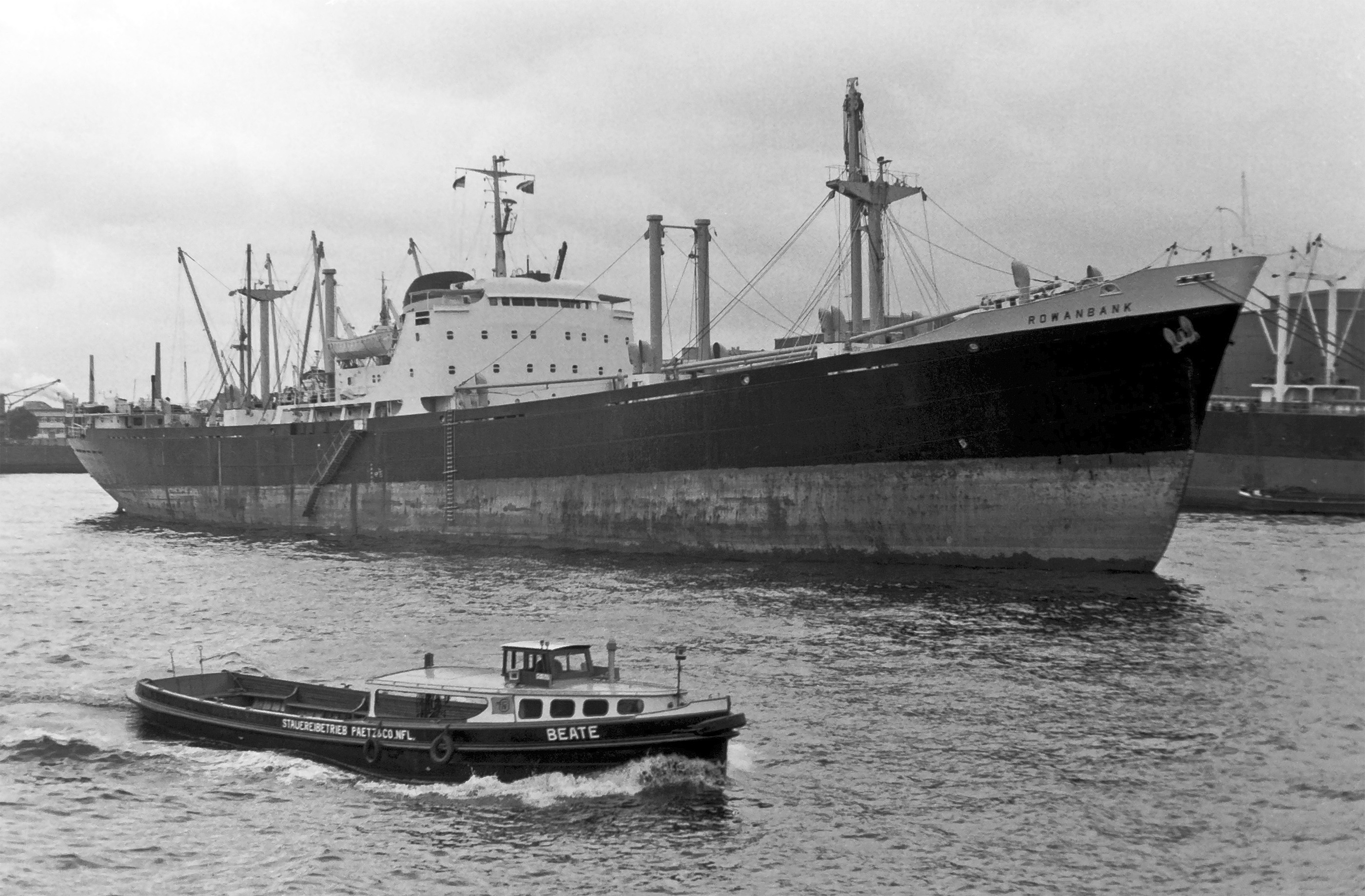
The Rowanbank in Hamburg

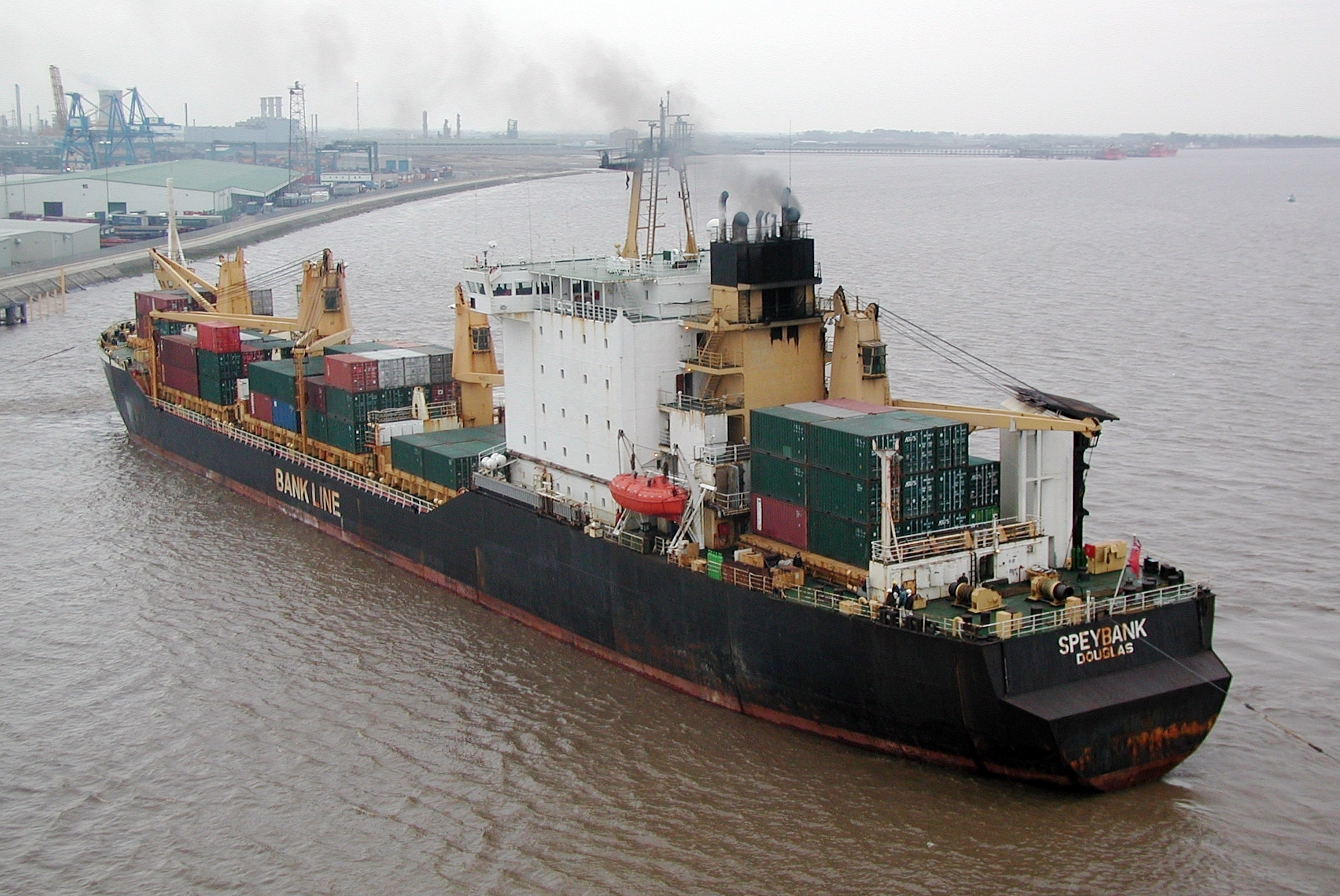
The 1983 built Speybank arriving at Hull

== Arms ==
Coat of arms of Bank Line

Notes
Granted 9 January 1958
Crest
Issuant from a mercantile crown Or two arms Proper the hands grasping a lymphad the sail furled Sable pennons flying to the dexter Gules.
Escutcheon
Or in front of two anchors in saltire Proper an oval cartouche scrolled Tenne and charged per bend sinister Gules and Azure a bendlet Argent.
Supporters
On the dexter side a triton Azure blowing a conch Or and on the sinister side a seadog Gules finned and armed also Or.
Motto
Per Laborem Ad Honorem
