= Liner Conference System =

A Liner Conference System (also called a "shipping conference") is an agreement within the shipping industry in relation to ocean liners. Typically, the agreement is between two or more shipping companies to provide scheduled cargo and/or passenger service on a particular trade route under uniform rates and common terms.

Although a Liner Conference System allows shipowners to club together, enabling them to continue to operate a regular "liner service" and maintain requisite standards of service, there is a downside. Such agreements may establish protectionist organisations that can involve monopoly abuse and possible breach of competition law. For instance, under European Community Law, article 101 of the Treaty of Rome (as amended) imposes a prima facie ban on anticompetitive "agreements between undertakings". However, the Encyclopædia Britannica site states that overall the advantages to the public of Liner Conferences outweigh their disadvantages.

== See also ==
- Far Eastern Freight Conference
