= John Readhead & Sons =

Coordinates: 54.988°N 1.44769°W

- Company type: Private
- Industry: Shipbuilding, ship repair, engine building, boilermaking
- Founded: 1865
- Defunct: 1984
- Fate: Acquired
- Successor: Swan Hunter
- Headquarters: South Shields, UK

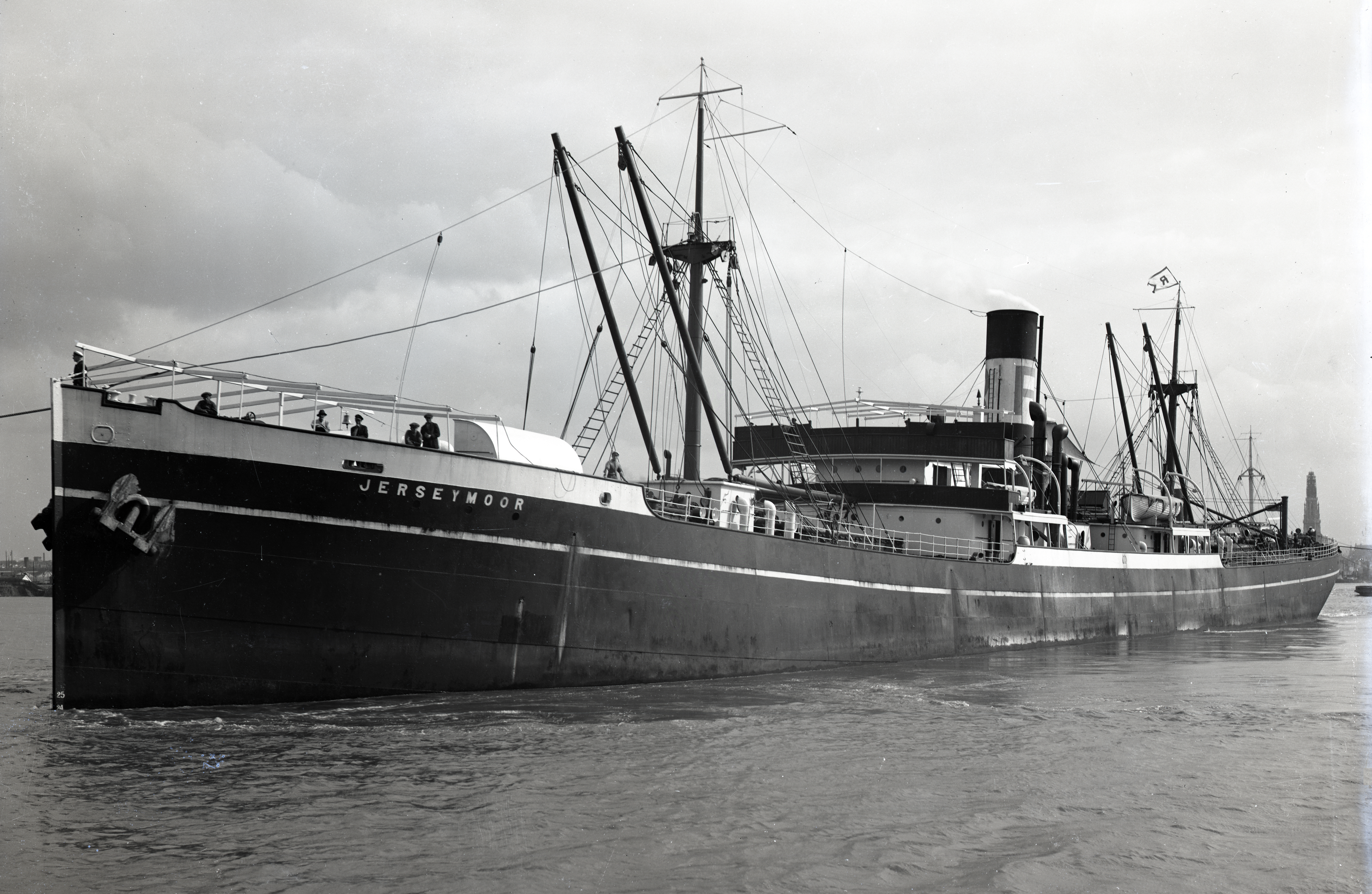
Cargo ship Jerseymoor, built in 1915 at John Readhead & Sons

John Readhead & Sons was a shipyard on the River Tyne in South Shields, Tyne and Wear, England founded in 1865.

== History ==
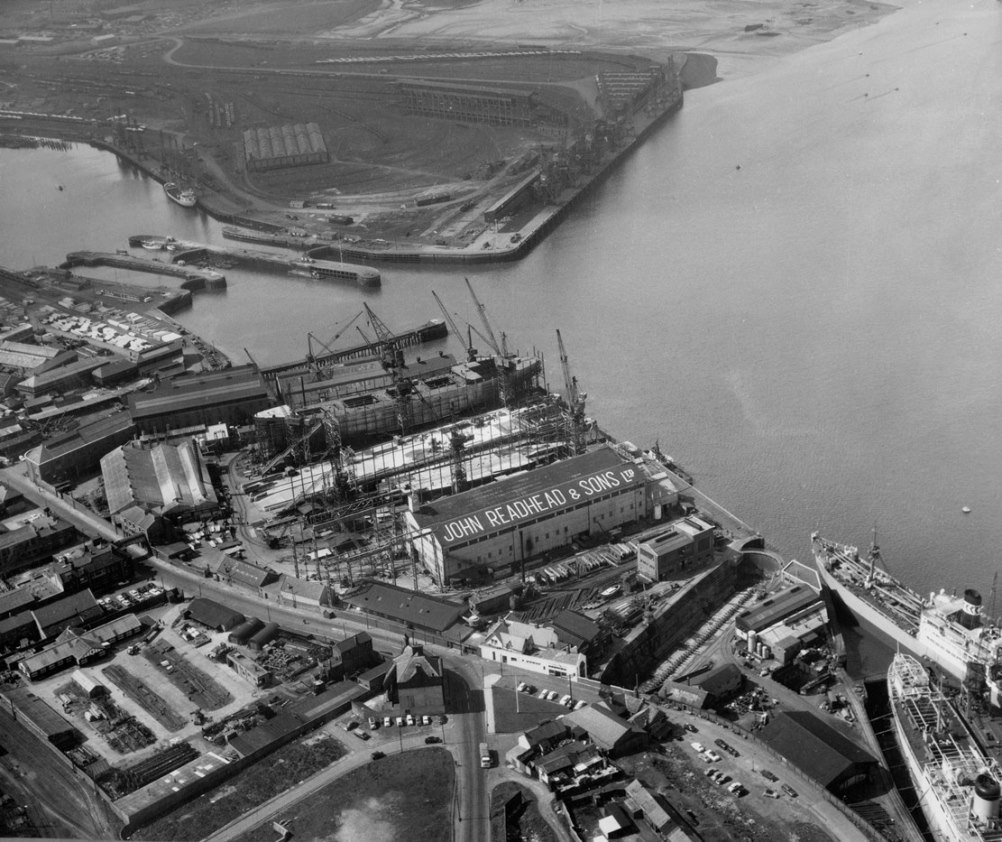
Aerial view of John Readhead & Sons shipyard in 1963

John Readhead and John Softley founded the business in 1865 in South Shields as Readhead and Softley. The first ship they built was a small collier called Unus. On 17 May 1950 the oil tanker 'Muristan' was launched at the yard for the Strick Line.

Swan Hunter bought the company in 1967 after publication of the Geddes Report which recommended rationalisation of shipbuilding on the River Tyne. It was nationalised with the rest of Swan Hunter in 1977. The yard at South Shields closed in 1984.
