= List of shipwrecks in July 1944 =

The list of shipwrecks in July 1944 includes ships sunk, foundered, grounded, or otherwise lost during July 1944.

== 1 July ==
List of shipwrecks: 1 July 1944
Ship	State	Description
F 586	Kriegsmarine	World War II: The Type C2 Marinefährprahm struck a mine and sank in the North Sea off Burgh-Haamstede, Zeeland, Netherlands.
Isuzugawa Maru No. 5	Japan	World War II: The coaster was torpedoed and sunk in the Pacific Ocean by USS Batfish (United States Navy).
Kamoi Maru	Japan	World War II: The coaster was torpedoed and sunk in the Pacific Ocean by USS Batfish (United States Navy).
KF 439	Kriegsmarine	World War II: The C Type Artilleriefährprahm was sunk in an Allied air raid on La Spezia, Liguria, Italy.
KF 503	Kriegsmarine	World War II: The C Type Artilleriefährprahm was sunk in an Allied air raid on La Spezia.
KF 589	Kriegsmarine	World War II: The C Type Artilleriefährprahm was sunk in an Allied air raid on La Spezia.
KF 620	Kriegsmarine	World War II: The C2 Type Artilleriefährprahm was sunk in an Allied air raid on La Spezia.
HMS LCA 183	Royal Navy	The landing craft assault (8.5/11.5 t, 1942) was lost on this date.
HMS LCA 248	Royal Navy	The landing craft assault (8.5/11.5 t, 1942) was lost on this date.
HMS LCA 258	Royal Navy	The landing craft assault (8.5/11.5 t, 1942) was lost on this date.
HMS LCA 400	Royal Navy	The landing craft assault (8.5/11.5 t, 1942) was lost on this date.
HMS LCA 802	Royal Navy	The landing craft assault (8.5/11.5 t, 1942) was lost on this date.
HMS LCS(M) 54	Royal Navy	The landing craft support (11.4/12.8 t, 1943) was lost on this date.
HMS ML 265	Royal Navy	The Fairmile B motor launch (76/86 t, 1941) burned at Freetown, Sierra Leone. Two crew died.
HMS ML 287	Royal Navy	The Fairmile B motor launch (76/86 t, 1941) burned at Freetown, Sierra Leone. Two crew died.
HMCS MTB 460	Royal Canadian Navy	World War II: The BPB 72'-class motor torpedo boat (46/53 t, 1944) was sunk in the English Channel off Normandy, France, by a mine.
Nikko Maru	Japan	World War II: The cargo ship struck a mine, possibly laid by submarine USS Kingfish (United States Navy), and sank in the Makassar Strait.
SK-506	Soviet Navy	The BMO/Project 194-class armored antisubmarine boat was sunk on this date.
Sperrbrecher 9	Kriegsmarine	World War II: The sperrbrecher was scuttled at Brest, Finistère, France. She was refloated in 1946 and scrapped in 1948.
HMS Strathella	Royal Navy	The naval trawler (210 GRT, 1913) foundered on the coast of Iceland. Raised in August 1946 and returned to owners.
TK-43	Soviet Navy	The G-5-class motor torpedo boat was lost on this date.
TK-63	Soviet Navy	The G-5-class motor torpedo boat was lost on this date.
Taiun Maru No.2	Japan	World War II: The cargo ship was torpedoed and sunk in the East China Sea by USS Tang (United States Navy).
Takatori Maru No.1	Japan	World War II: The tanker was torpedoed and sunk in the East China Sea by USS Tang (United States Navy).

== 2 July ==
List of shipwrecks: 2 July 1944
Ship	State	Description
Bodegraven	Netherlands	World War II: The cargo ship was torpedoed and sunk in the Atlantic Ocean 200 nautical miles (370 km) south of Monrovia, Liberia (4°14′N 11°00′W) by U-547 (Kriegsmarine) with the loss of nine of the 111 people on board. Her captain was taken on board U-547 as a prisoner of war. The other survivors were rescued by warships based at Dakar, French West Africa or reached land in their lifeboats.
Empire Broadsword	United Kingdom	World War II: The Type C1-S-AY-1 landing ship infantry (7,177 GRT, 1943) struck a mine and sank in the English Channel off Normandy, France (49°25′N 0°54′W), with the loss of two of her 72 crew. Survivors were rescued by USS PC-1225 (United States Navy).
F 827	Kriegsmarine	The Type DM minelayer Marinefahrprahm was sunk on this date.
Jean Nicolet	United States	World War II: The Liberty ship was torpedoed and sunk in the Indian Ocean off the Maldive Islands (3°28′S 74°16′E) by I-8 (Imperial Japanese Navy). Ninety-five were forced aboard the submarine tied and beaten with many dying. Her master and three crewmen were made prisoners, only one crewman survived captivity. Others died when the submarine submerged on approach of an aircraft. A total of 27 passengers, eighteen gunners and 31 crewmen died. Five in a boat were not noticed. Survivors, four passengers, ten gunners and ten crewmen were rescued by HMIS Hoxa (Royal Indian Navy).
HMS MMS 1019	Royal Navy	World War II: The MMS-class minesweeper (360/430 t, 1943) was sunk by a mine in the English Channel off Cherbourg, Seine-Inférieure, France with the loss of 6 crew.
Platon	United States	The 8-gross register ton, 29.7-foot (9.1 m) fishing vessel was destroyed by fire at Chignik, Territory of Alaska.
R-180	Kriegsmarine	World War II: The Type R-151 minesweeper was torpedoed and sunk off Fécamp, Seine-Inférieure by HMMTB 632 and HMMTB 650 (both Royal Navy).
U-543	Kriegsmarine	World War II: The Type IXC/40 submarine was depth charged, torpedoed and sunk in the Atlantic Ocean south west of Tenerife, Canary Islands, Spain (25°34′N 21°36′W) by Grumman TBF Avenger aircraft based on USS Wake Island (United States Navy) with the loss of all 58 crew.
USS YMS-350	United States Navy	World War II: The YMS-1-class minesweeper struck a mine and sank off Utah Beach, Manche, France (49°38′N 01°35′W).

== 3 July ==
List of shipwrecks: 3 July 1944
Ship	State	Description
Agathe	Germany	World War II: The cargo ship was sunk in the Aegean Sea off Rhodes, Greece by Allied aircraft. Twelve crew and passengers were missing.
Dairen Maru	Japan	World War II: Convoy TAKA-04: The cargo ship was torpedoed and sunk in the East China Sea off Amami Shima (28°53′N 129°51′E) by USS Sturgeon (United States Navy). Nineteen crewmen were killed.
Gyoyo Maru	Japan	World War II: The cargo liner was torpedoed and sunk in the East China Sea (19°28′N 115°41′E) by USS Seahorse (United States Navy).
Kamo Maru	Japan	World War II: Convoy TAMA-20B: The cargo liner was torpedoed and sunk in the East China Sea (32°25′N 128°50′E) by USS Tinosa (United States Navy). A total of 415 troops, three passengers, 74 crewmen and seven gunners were killed.
Konzan Maru	Imperial Japanese Navy	World War II: Convoy TAMA-20B: The tanker (a.k.a. Konsan Maru) was torpedoed and sunk in the East China Sea (32°25′N 128°50′E) by USS Tinosa (United States Navy). Twenty-three crewmen were killed.
Kyodo Maru No.36	Japan	World War II: The cargo ship was torpedoed and sunk in the South China Sea by USS Lapon (United States Navy).
HMS LCA 1393	Royal Navy	The landing craft assault (8.5/11.5 t, 1943) was lost on this date.
M 4225	Kriegsmarine	World War II: The minesweeper struck a mine and sank in the Bay of Biscay off Saint-Nazaire, France.
Nitto Maru	Japan	World War II: The cargo ship was torpedoed and sunk in the East China Sea by USS Seahorse (United States Navy).
Tairin Maru	Japan	World War II: The cargo ship was torpedoed and sunk in the Pacific Ocean off the Ryukyu Islands by USS Sturgeon (United States Navy).
U-154	Kriegsmarine	World War II: The Type IX submarine was depth charged and sunk in the Atlantic Ocean (34°00′N 19°30′W) by the destroyer escorts USS Frost and USS Inch and aircraft based on the escort carrier USS Croatan (all (United States Navy) with the loss of all 57 crew.
U-1191	Kriegsmarine	World War II: The Type VIIC submarine was depth charged and sunk in the English Channel southwest of Brighton, England, at 50°03′N 02°59′W by the frigates HMS Affleck and HMS Balfour (both Royal Navy) with the loss of all 50 crew members.
UJ 1426	Kriegsmarine	World War II: The submarine chaser was sunk in an Allied air raid on Lorient, France.

== 4 July ==
List of shipwrecks: 4 July 1944
Ship	State	Description
Asukazan Maru	Japan	World War II: The cargo ship was torpedoed and sunk in the East China Sea by USS Tang (United States Navy) with the loss of 32 lives. There were some survivors, who were rescued by Japanese fishing boats.
BK-504	Soviet Navy	World War II: The MBK/Project 161-class motor gun boat was sunk by mines.
BK-509	Soviet Navy	World War II: The MBK/Project 161-class motor gun boat was sunk by mines.
BK-514	Soviet Navy	World War II: The MBK/Project 161-class motor gun boat was sunk by mines.
Ch-16	Imperial Japanese Navy	World War II: Convoy 3628: The No.13-class submarine chaser was bombed and sunk off Chichi Jima (27°00′N 140°50′E) by United States Navy aircraft.
Daiko Maru	Imperial Japanese Navy	The auxiliary submarine chaser was sunk on this date.
Hinko Maru	Imperial Japanese Navy	World War II: The Hinko Maru-class auxiliary transport was damaged and beached near the shore of Sakaiura Beach, Chichijima, Ogasawara Bonin Islands (17°28′N 144°19′E) and abandoned after suffering unspecified damages, in addition to damage inflicted by US Navy aircraft on 12 June during the attack on Convoy No. 6811 north of Saipan.
I-10	Imperial Japanese Navy	World War II: The Type A1 submarine was sunk in the Pacific Ocean (15°26′N 147°48′E) by USS David W. Taylor and USS Riddle (both United States Navy).
Kal 14	Greece	World War II: The sailing vessel was torpedoed and sunk in the Mediterranean Sea off Santorini by HMS Vox (Royal Navy).
Kittanning	United States	World War II: The Type T2-SE-A2 tanker was torpedoed and damaged in the Caribbean Sea off Cristóbal, Panama (9°55′N 79°27′W) by U-539 (Kriegsmarine). All 74 crew abandoned ship before U-539 fired a coup-de-grâce which failed to sink her. The crew were rescued by USCGC Marion (United States Coast Guard). The ship was later towed to Balboa, Panama for temporary repairs. She was then towed to Galveston, Texas, United States for permanent repairs to be effected.
Kyodo Maru No.28	Japan	WWII: The cargo ship was torpedoed and sunk in the East China Sea by USS Seahorse (United States Navy).
M 469	Kriegsmarine	World War II: The minesweeper was torpedoed and sunk in the North Sea off Vlieland, Friesland, Netherlands by HMMTB 458 (Royal Navy).
M 474	Kriegsmarine	World War II: The minesweeper was severely damaged in an attack by Allied aircraft at Bénodet, France, and was consequently beached.
Ringen	Norway	World War II: Convoy ETC 26: The cargo ship (1,499 GRT, 1917) struck a mine and was damaged in the English Channel off the Isle of Wight, United Kingdom with the loss of one of her 30 crew. Survivors were rescued by HMS Fernie (Royal Navy). Ringen was torpedoed and sunk the next day by U-763 (Kriegsmarine)
USS S-28	United States Navy	The S-class submarine failed to surface after a training dive off Pearl Harbor, Hawaii.
Sarushima	Imperial Japanese Navy	World War II: Convoy 3628: The Natsushima-class minelayer was bombed and sunk off Chichi Jima (27°06′N 142°10′E) by United States Navy aircraft.
Shima Maru	Japan	World War II: Convoy 3628: The transport was bombed and sunk off Chichi Jima (28°35′N 141°04′E) by United States Navy aircraft.
Shozui Maru	Japan	World War II: Convoy 3628: The transport was bombed and sunk off Chichi Jima (28°35′N 141°04′E) by United States Navy aircraft.
T-103	Imperial Japanese Navy	World War II: The T-103-class landing ship was bombed and sunk 108 nautical miles (200 km; 124 mi) off Chichi Jima (27°06′N 140°09′E) by United States Navy aircraft.
T-130	Imperial Japanese Navy	World War II: The T-103-class landing ship was bombed and sunk off Iwo Jima (24°47′N 141°20′E) by United States Navy aircraft.
TK-156	Soviet Navy	The D-3-class motor torpedo boat was lost on this date.
Taiko Maru	Imperial Japanese Navy	World War II: Convoy 3628: The auxiliary netlayer was bombed and sunk off Onagawa Retto (28°20′N 141°50′E) by United States Navy aircraft.
Tama Maru	Japan	World War II: The cargo ship was torpedoed and sunk in the Philippine Sea north west of Palau (07°50′N 133°40′E) by USS Guavina (United States Navy). A total of 321 troops, two gunners and eleven crewmen were killed.
Tatsuei Maru	Japan	World War II: Convoy 3628: The transport was bombed and sunk off Chichi Jima (28°35′N 141°04′E) by United States Navy aircraft.
Toshi Maru No. 5	Imperial Japanese Navy	World War II: Convoy 3628: The auxiliary minesweeper was bombed and sunk off Chichi Jima (28°35′N 141°04′E) by United States Navy aircraft.
Unyo Maru No. 8	Japan	World War II: Convoy 3628: The transport ship was bombed and sunk off Chichi Jima(28°35′N 141°04′E) by United States Navy aircraft.
V 208 R. Walther Darré	Kriegsmarine	World War II: The Vorpostenboot was sunk in the English Channel off the coast of Normandy, France, by HMCMTB 748 HMCMTB 735, HMCMTB 743 and HMCMTB 734 (all Royal Canadian Navy).
V 210 Hinrich Hey	Kriegsmarine	World War II: The Vorpostenboot was sunk in the English Channel off the coast of Normandy by HMCMTB 748 HMCMTB 735, HMCMTB 743 and HMCMTB 734 (all Royal Canadian Navy).
W-25	Imperial Japanese Navy	World War II: Convoy 3628: The No.19-class minesweeper was bombed and sunk off Chichi Jima (28°35′N 141°04′E) by United States Navy aircraft.
Yamaoka Maru	Japan	World War II: The cargo ship was torpedoed and sunk in the East China Sea by USS Tang (United States Navy), which rescued one survivor.

== 5 July ==
List of shipwrecks: 5 July 1944
Ship	State	Description
AF 99	Kriegsmarine	World War II: The D Type Artilleriefährprahm was sunk at Boulogne, Pas-de-Calais, France in an Allied air raid.
Dori Maru	Japan	World War II: The cargo ship was torpedoed and sunk in the East China Sea off Dairen, China by USS Tang (United States Navy).
HMT Ganilly	Royal Navy	World War II: The Isles-class naval trawler (545 GRT) was torpedoed and sunk in the English Channel off Utah Beach, Manche, France (49°36′N 0°57′W) by U-390 (Kriegsmarine) with the loss of all 39 hands.
Glendinning	United Kingdom	World War II: Convoy ETC 27: The cargo ship (1,927 GRT, 1921) was torpedoed and sunk in the English Channel off Cap d'Antifer, Seine Maritime, France (50°32′30″N 0°22′00″W) by U-953 (Kriegsmarine) with the loss of four of her 33 crew. Survivors were rescued by HMML 250 (Royal Navy).
Kogi Maru	Imperial Japanese Navy	World War II: The Kogi Maru-class auxiliary netlayer was torpedoed and sunk in the Pacific Ocean off Otōto-jima, Bonin Islands (27°50′N 141°20′E) by USS Plaice (United States Navy). Three crew were killed.
Koshu Maru	Japan	World War II: The cargo ship was bombed and sunk at Ambon, Maluku by Consolidated B-24 Liberator aircraft of the United States Army Air Force.
Lobau	Germany	World War II: The river tug struck a mine and sank at km 1084.5 in the Danube with the loss of ten lives.
HMMTB 666	Royal Navy	World War II: The Fairmile D motor torpedo boat (102/118 t, 1943) was shelled and sunk in the North Sea off IJmuiden, North Holland, Netherlands by Kriegsmarine surface ships.
Noreen Mary	United Kingdom	World War II: The 117.7-foot (35.9 m) trawler (207 GRT, 1916) was machine gunned, shelled, and sunk in the North Sea (58°30′N 5°23′W) by U-247 (Kriegsmarine) with the loss of eight of her ten crew including her skipper. Two survivors rescued the next day by HMT Lady Madeleine (Royal Navy).
R 111	Kriegsmarine	World War II: The R-boat was bombed and sunk in the North Sea off Vlieland, Friesland, Netherlands by Allied aircraft.
Shanmai Maru	Japan	World War II: The cargo liner was torpedoed and sunk in the Pacific Ocean off the Kuril Islands by USS Sunfish (United States Navy).
U-233	Kriegsmarine	World War II: The Type XB submarine was depth charged in the Atlantic Ocean (42°16′N 59°49′W) by USS Baker (United States Navy). She surfaced and was rammed and sunk by USS Thomas (United States Navy) with the loss of 33 of her 61 crew.
U-390	Kriegsmarine	World War II: The Type VIIC submarine was depth charged and sunk in the Baie de la Seine (49°52′N 0°48′W by HMS Tavy and HMS Wanderer (both Royal Navy) with the loss of 48 of her 49 crew. The survivor was rescued by HMS Wanderer.
U-586	Kriegsmarine	World War II: The Type VIIC submarine was bombed and sunk at Toulon, Var, France by Consolidated B-24 Liberator aircraft of the United States Army Air Force.
U-642	Kriegsmarine	World War II: The Type VIIC submarine was sunk in the Mediterranean Sea off Toulon (43°07′N 5°55′E) by Consolidated B-24 Liberator aircraft of the United States Army Air Force. She was raised on 12 April 1945.
UJ 6070 Cetonia	Kriegsmarine	World War II: The submarine chaser was bombed and severely damaged at Toulon by Consolidated B-24 Liberator aircraft of the United States Army Air Force. She was declared a total loss.
UJ-6077	Kriegsmarine	World War II: The CH-1-class submarine chaser was bombed and sunk by Allied aircraft.
Unknown	Empire of Japan	World War II: The sailing ship was sunk in Makassar Strait (00°41′N 119°51′E) by USS Bonefish.
Usugumo	Imperial Japanese Navy	World War II: The Fubuki-class destroyer was torpedoed and sunk in the Sea of Okhotsk (47°43′N 147°55′E) by USS Skate (United States Navy). Two hundred and sixty-seven crewmen were killed, 49 were rescued.
V 1254 Hermann Garrel	Kriegsmarine	World War II: The Vorpostenboot was torpedoed and sunk in the North Sea off Terschelling, Friesland by a Royal Navy motor torpedo boat.
V 1256 Hinrich Onnen	Kriegsmarine	World War II: The naval drifter/Vorpostenboot was sunk in the North Sea off Terschelling, either torpedoed or bombed by an Allied aircraft.
V 1411 Zeemeuw	Kriegsmarine	The Vorpostenboot sank in the North Sea off IJmuiden, North Holland, Netherlands. 14 crew were killed.

== 6 July ==
List of shipwrecks: 6 July 1944
Ship	State	Description
HMS Cato	Royal Navy	World War II: The Auk-class minesweeper (890/1,250 t, 1943) was torpedoed and sunk in the English Channel off Normandy, France (49°24′N 00°17′W) by a Kriegsmarine Neger manned torpedo. 25 crew died.
Empire Halberd	United Kingdom	World War II: The Landing Ship, Infantry (Large) struck a mine 4 nautical miles (7.4 km) off the Longships Lighthouse, Cornwall and was damaged. Subsequently repaired and returned to service.
Hokaze	Imperial Japanese Navy	World War II: The Minekaze-class destroyer was torpedoed and sunk in the Celebes Sea 169 kilometres (105 mi) north-northeast of Menado and 20 kilometres (12 mi) south of Tahuma (3°24′N 125°38′E) by USS Paddle (United States Navy). Her commanding officer and an unknown number of crew were killed, plus 69 of 118 survivors of Yamamiya Maru (Imperial Japanese Army) on board. Survivors were rescued by Tonan Maru and Kaio Maru No. 3, both auxiliarys.
Italia	Italy	World War II: The cargo ship was bombed, set afire, burnt out and sank at Trieste during an Allied air raid. She was refloated in 1950 and scrapped.
HMS Magic	Royal Navy	World War II: The Auk-class minesweeper (890/1,250 t, 1943) was torpedoed and sunk off Normandy (49°25′N 00°17′W) by a Kriegsmarine Neger manned torpedo. 26 crew died.
Ob	Soviet Union	World War II: The cargo ship was torpedoed and sunk in the Sea of Okhotsk by USS Sunfish (United States Navy). Her captain and thirteen crewmen were killed. There were 26 survivors.
R-224	Kriegsmarine	World War II: The Type R-218 minesweeper was sunk at Le Havre, Seine-Inférieure, France by sabotage. Raised and taken to the Baltic.
Setsuzan Maru	Japan	World War II: Convoy No. 6611: The cargo ship was torpedoed and sunk in the South China Sea 100 nautical miles (190 km) east of Ningpo, China (29°59′N 122°53′E) by USS Sealion (United States Navy). A crewman was killed.
Stadt Riga	Germany	World War II: The cargo ship was torpedoed and sunk at Borkum by British aircraft.
Takamiya Maru	Imperial Japanese Navy	World War II: The guard ship was torpedoed and sunk at Chichi-jima by USS Cobia (United States Navy).
HMS Trollope	Royal Navy	World War II: The Captain-class frigate (1,432/1,823 t, 1944) was torpedoed and damaged in the English Channel off La Poterie-Cap-d'Antifer, Haute-Normandie, France by S 76 (Kriegsmarine) with the loss of 63 crew. She was not repaired.
V 715 Alfred I	Kriegsmarine	World War II: The Alfred 1-class naval trawler/Vorpostenboot was sunk in the Bay of Biscay off Brest, Finistère, France in a battle with HMCS Qu'Appelle, HMCS Restigouche, HMCS Saskatchewan and HMCS Skeena (all Royal Canadian Navy). Survivors were rescued by S 112 and S 145 (both Kriegsmarine).
V 721	Kriegsmarine	World War II: The Vorpostenboot was severely damaged in the Bay of Biscay off Brest in a battle with HMCS Qu'Appelle, HMCS Restigouche, HMCS Saskatchewan and HMCS Skeena (all Royal Canadian Navy). She was consequently beached.

== 7 July ==
List of shipwrecks: 7 July 1944
Ship	State	Description
CHa-6	Imperial Japanese Navy	The CHa-1-class auxiliary submarine chaser sank off Rabaul, New Guinea.
ORP Dragon	Polish Navy	World War II: The Danae-class cruiser was severely damaged in the English Channel off Caen, Calvados, France by an attack by a Neger manned torpedo. She was consequently scuttled as part of Mulberry B off Coursuelles-sur-Mer, Calvados on 20 July.
Esso Harrisburg	United States	World War II: The tanker was torpedoed and sunk in the Caribbean Sea 200 nautical miles (370 km) north west of Aruba, Netherlands Antilles (13°26′N 72°11′W) by U-516 (Kriegsmarine) with the loss of eight of her 72 crew. Survivors were rescued by HNLMS Konigin Wilhelmina (Koninklijk Marine) and USS SC-1299 (United States Navy).
HMS FDT 216	Royal Navy	World War II: The fighter direction tender, a converted LST Mk 2 (1,625/4,080 t, 1943), was torpedoed and sunk off Cherbourg, Seine-Inférieure, France by Luftwaffe aircraft. Five Royal Air Force radar crew were killed. About 250 survivors were rescued by the corvette HMS Burdock.
Koto Maru No. 2 Go	Imperial Japanese Navy	World War II: The Koto Maru No. 2 Go-class auxiliary transport ship was torpedoed by USS Flasher (United States Navy) about 11 nautical miles (20 km; 13 mi) south east of entrance to Port Dayot Bay (Qui Sande Bay), French Indochina (12°58′N 109°28′E) and sank in the South China Sea off Cape Varella (13°08′N 109°28′E) at 1:05 AM on 8 July with the loss of two crewmen.
HMS LCM 138	Royal Navy	The landing craft medium (21/35 t, 1942) was lost on this date.
Perle	Free French Naval Forces	World War II: The submarine was sunk in the Atlantic Ocean off the coast of Newfoundland by a Fairey Swordfish aircraft based on MV Empire MacCallum (United Kingdom) with the loss of 41 of her 42 crew.
Lesina	Germany	World War II: The schooner was captured in the Ionian Sea at the mouth of the Aspropotamos River by the Greek Partizan armed schooner Angios Demitrios. She was later scuttled.
HMCS MTB 463	Royal Canadian Navy	World War II: The BPB 72 foot-class motor torpedo boat (46/53 t, 1944) was sunk by a mine in the English Channel off Normandy.
Ryuei Maru	Imperial Japanese Navy	World War II: The auxiliary guard ship was shelled and sunk in the Celebes Sea off Tarakan, Borneo (02°40′N 118°22′E) by USS Bonefish (United States Navy).
SF 179	Kriegsmarine	The Siebel ferry was sunk on this date.
Sabaudia	Germany	World War II: The troopship capsized and sank at Vallone di Zaule, Italy, due to damage inflicted by a 15th Air Force air raid the previous day. She was refloated in 1949 and scrapped.
Tamanami	Imperial Japanese Navy	World War II: The Yūgumo-class destroyer was torpedoed and sunk in the Philippine Sea 180 nautical miles (330 km) south west of Manila, Philippines (13°55′N 118°30′E) by USS Mingo (United States Navy) with the loss of all 228 crew.
U-678	Kriegsmarine	World War II: The Type VIIC submarine was depth charged and sunk in the English Channel south west of Brighton, Sussex, United Kingdom (50°32′N 0°23′W) by HMCS Kootenay, HMCS Ottawa (both Royal Canadian Navy) and HMS Statice (Royal Navy) with the loss of all 52 crew.
Uløy	Norway	World War II: The fishing cutter (131 GRT, 1942) was bombed and sunk in the Barents Sea off Hamningberg, Norway with the loss of 13 lives.
West Nilus	United States	World War II: The cargo ship was sunk as a breakwater for Gooseberry No. 2 off Omaha Beach, Calvados, France.

== 8 July ==
List of shipwrecks: 8 July 1944
Ship	State	Description
Empire Brutus	United Kingdom	World War II: The cargo ship (7,233 GRT, 1943) struck a mine in the English Channel and was damaged. She was beached on Juno Beach off Arromanches, Basse-Normandie, France. Later refloated and towed to Middlesbrough Yorkshire for repairs.
Kurama Maru	Imperial Japanese Navy	The auxiliary submarine chaser was sunk on this date.
HMS LCP(L) 267	Royal Navy	The landing craft personnel (large) (5.9/8.2 t, 1943) was lost on this date.
M 264	Kriegsmarine	World War II: The minesweeper was sunk in the North Sea west of Heligoland by rocket-armed aircraft.
M 4601	Kriegsmarine	World War II: The minesweeper was sunk in the English Channel off the Channel Islands by HMCS Huron (Royal Canadian Navy) and HMS Tartar (Royal Navy).
M 4605	Kriegsmarine	World War II: The minesweeper was sunk in the English Channel off the Channel Islands by HMCS Huron (Royal Canadian Navy) and HMS Tartar (Royal Navy).
Miranda	Germany	World War II: The cargo ship was bombed and sunk by aircraft off the Elbe.
Matsu Maru	Japan	World War II: The cargo ship was torpedoed and sunk in the Pacific Ocean off the coast of Japan by USS Tautog (United States Navy) with the loss of all but one of her crew.
Moji Maru	Imperial Japanese Navy	World War II: The guard ship was shelled and sunk in the Celebes Sea east of Borneo (02°25′N 118°14′E) by USS Bonefish (United States Navy).
No. 7	Imperial Japanese Navy	World War II: The auxiliary submarine chaser was sunk in an air attack at Rabaul, New Guinea.
No. 9	Imperial Japanese Navy	World War II: The auxiliary submarine chaser was sunk in an air attack at Rabaul, New Guinea.
Nitto Maru No. 19	Imperial Japanese Navy	World War II: The auxiliary submarine chaser was bombed and sunk at Rabaul, New Guinea by Vought F4U Corsair aircraft of the Royal New Zealand Air Force.
Nitto Maru No. 20	Imperial Japanese Navy	World War II: The auxiliary submarine chaser was bombed and sunk at Rabaul, New Guinea by Vought F4U Corsair aircraft of the Royal New Zealand Air Force.
Perle	Free French Naval Forces	World War II: The Saphir-class submarine was sunk in the North Atlantic Ocean at 55°27′N 30°50′W by a Fairey Swordfish aircraft from the Merchant Aircraft Carrier Empire MacCallum (United Kingdom) after the Swordfish crew mistook her for a German U-boat. Only one member of her crew of 42 survived. Her 41 lost crewmen were the last casualties the French submarine forces suffered during World War II.
HMS Pylades	Royal Navy	World War II: The Catherine-class minesweeper (890/1,250 t, 1943) was sunk in the English Channel off Juno Beach, Calvados, France by a Marder midget submarine (Kriegsmarine). 11 crew died.
S-666	Kriegsmarine	The S-631-class motor torpedo boat burned on this date.
Sif	Sweden	World War II: The cargo ship was bombed and sunk in the North Sea south-west of Heligoland, Germany, by British aircraft.
Tannhäuser	Germany	World War II: The cargo ship was bombed and sunk in the North Sea south west of Heligoland by British aircraft.
U-243	Kriegsmarine	World War II: The Type VIIC submarine was depth charged and sunk in the Bay of Biscay west of Nantes, Loire-Inférieure, France (47°06′N 6°40′W) by a Short Sunderland aircraft of 10 Squadron, Royal Australian Air Force with the loss of eleven of her 49 crew.

== 9 July ==
List of shipwrecks: 9 July 1944
Ship	State	Description
Asagao	Imperial Japanese Navy	The Wakatake-class destroyer was driven aground on a reef near Belier Island, Hainan by a typhoon. Refloated 25 September 1944. She was repaired and returned to service by mid-October 1944.
Hokoriu Maru	Japan	World War II: The coaster was shelled and sunk in the Pacific Ocean off the coast of Japan by USS Tautog (United States Navy). Six crew survived.
Hokushin Maru	Imperial Japanese Army	World War II: Convoy F-2: The Hague Maru-class auxiliary transport drifted aground in a typhoon 20 kilometres (12 mi) south of Yulin, Hainan at an anchorage north west of Belier Island. That night she was bombed and sunk by United States 14th Air Force aircraft at 18°00′N 109°30′E. Six crew were killed.
HMS LCT 300	Royal Navy	The Mk 3-class landing craft tank (350/625 t, 1942) was lost on this date.
HMS LCT 390	Royal Navy	The Mk 3-class landing craft tank (350/625 t, 1942) was lost on this date.
HMS LCT 511	Royal Navy	The Mk 4-class landing craft tank (350/586 t, 1942) was lost under tow on this date.
HMS MTB 434	Royal Navy	World War II: The motor torpedo boat (46/53 t, 1943) was sunk in the North Sea in a battle with V 1301 Uranus, V 1306 Otto Krogmann, V 1312 Bredenbeck, V 1310 Gotland and V 1313 Uran (all Kriegsmarine).
No. 316	Soviet Navy	The KM-4-class river minesweeping launch was sunk on this date.
Oyashima Maru	Japan	World War II: The cargo ship was bombed and sunk in the Pacific Ocean by Consolidated B-24 Liberator aircraft of the United States Army Air Force.
Shahzada	United Kingdom	World War II: The cargo ship (5,454 GRT, 1942) was torpedoed and sunk in the Arabian Sea south west of Bombay, India (15°30′N 65°30′E) by U-196 (Kriegsmarine) with the loss of 46 of her 98 crew. Survivors were rescued by Changon (United Kingdom) and Magna (Sweden) or reached land in their lifeboat.
USS Swerve	United States Navy	World War II: The Auk-class minesweeper struck a mine and sank in the Mediterranean Sea off Anzio, Lazio, Italy (41°31′N 12°28′E).
Taihei Maru	Japan	World War II: The cargo ship was torpedoed and sunk in the Pacific Ocean off the Kuril Islands by USS Sunfish (United States Navy).
V 1308 Bredenbeck	Kriegsmarine	World War II: The Vorpostenboot was sunk in the North Sea in a battle with HMMTB 434 and other vessels of the 54th MTB Flotilla (all Royal Navy).
Yawata Maru	Japan	World War II: The fishing trawler was sunk in the Pacific Ocean north east of Honshu by USS Tautog (United States Navy).

== 10 July ==
List of shipwrecks: 10 July 1944
Ship	State	Description
Anita	Germany	World War II: The cargo ship was torpedoed and sunk in the Aegean Sea off Tinos, Greece by HMS Vox (Royal Navy).
CHa-23	Imperial Japanese Navy	World War II: The CHa-1-class auxiliary submarine chaser was bombed and sunk off Rabaul, New Guinea by Vought F4U Corsair aircraft of the Royal New Zealand Air Force.
Duilio	Germany	World War II: The laid-up troopship / hospital ship was bombed and sunk at Trieste, Italy, by Allied aircraft. The wreck was refloated and scrapped in 1948.
F 124	Kriegsmarine	The Siebel ferry was sunk on this date.
F 128	Kriegsmarine	The Siebel ferry was sunk on this date.
Giulio Cesare	Italy	WWII: The laid-up passenger ship was bombed and badly damaged at Trieste, Italy, by Allied aircraft.
HMS LCT 757	Royal Navy	The Mk 4-class landing craft tank (350/586 t, 1943) was lost on this date.
HMS MMS 55	Royal Navy	World War II: The MMS-class minesweeper (255/295 t, 1941) was sunk in the English Channel by a mine off Normandy, France. 16 crew were killed.
No. 55	Imperial Japanese Navy	World War II: The midget submarine, possibly a supply container, was discovered aground in Umatac Bay, Guam. The vessel was shelled and destroyed with gunfire by USS Halford (United States Navy).
Shosei Maru No. 5	Japan	World War II: The fishing trawler was sunk in the East China Sea by USS Tinosa (United States Navy).
Unknown	Empire of Japan	World War II: The sampan was shelled and sunk in the Sulu Sea (07°10′N 119°12′E) by USS Bonefish.

== 11 July ==
List of shipwrecks: 11 July 1944
Ship	State	Description
No. 251	Imperial Japanese Navy	The T 38-class motor torpedo boat was lost on this date.
Senyo Maru	Japan	World War II: The cargo ship was sunk in the Yangtze River by aircraft.
Taian Maru No.2	Japan	World War II: The cargo ship was torpedoed and sunk in the South China Sea by USS Sealion (United States Navy).
Tsukushi Maru No.2	Japan	World War II: The cargo ship was torpedoed and sunk in the South China Sea by USS Sealion (United States Navy) with the loss of 38 lives.
U-1222	Kriegsmarine	World War II: The Type IXC/40 submarine was depth charged and sunk in the Bay of Biscay west of La Rochelle, Charente-Maritime, France (46°31′N 5°29′W) by a Short Sunderland aircraft of 201 Squadron, Royal Air Force with the loss of all 56 crew.
Unknown	Kriegsmarine	World War II: The assault boat was sunk by Allied aircraft at Pasman Island. Scuttled by crew to prevent salvage.
Yawata Maru	Japan	World War II: The cargo ship was sunk by United States Navy PT boats off Babo, West Papua.

== 12 July ==
List of shipwrecks: 12 July 1944
Ship	State	Description
BK-2	Soviet Navy	World War II: The Project 1125-class armored motor gunboat was sunk by German shells during a landing operation at Pinsk. Four crew were killed.
BK-92	Soviet Navy	World War II: The Project 1125-class armored motor gunboat was sunk by German shells during a landing operation at Pinsk. Seven crew and eight soldiers were killed.
BK-303	Soviet Navy	The Project 1125-class armored motor gunboat was sunk on this date.
Empire Tristram	United Kingdom	World War II: The cargo ship was again damaged by bombs in the Surrey Commercial Docks, London. She was subsequently repaired and returned to service.
HMS ML 433	Royal Navy	World War II: The Fairmile B motor launch (76/86 t, 1941) struck a mine and sank in the Tyrrhenian Sea off the west coast of Italy.
Nichiran Maru	Imperial Japanese Army	World War II: Convoy MOMA-01: The cargo ship was torpedoed and sunk in the Bashi Strait (18°50′N 122°40′E) by USS Piranha (United States Navy). A total of 1,238 troops, a gunner and fifteen crewmen were killed. Survivors were rescued by Kashi Maru (Japan).

== 13 July ==
List of shipwrecks: 13 July 1944
Ship	State	Description
Daiji Maru	Japan	World War II: The cargo ship was torpedoed and sunk at Chichi-jima by USS Cobia (United States Navy). 344 passengers, 15 armed guards and 29 crewmen were killed.
HMS LCV(P) 1288	Royal Navy	The landing craft vehicle and personnel was lost on this date.
HMS LCE 13	Royal Navy	The landing craft emergency repair was lost on this date.
Tokai Maru	Japan	World War II: The cargo ship was bombed and sunk in the Pacific Ocean by Consolidated B-24 Liberator aircraft of the United States Army Air Force.
V 203 Carl Röver	Kriegsmarine	World War II: The vorpostenboot was severely damaged by Royal Navy Motor Torpedo Boats and also by fighter aircraft in the English Channel. She was consequently withdrawn from service in September.

== 14 July ==
List of shipwrecks: 14 July 1944
Ship	State	Description
Kofresi	United States	World War II: The 1022 Hog Islander-class cargo ship was sunk as a breakwater for Gooseberry No. 2 off Omaha Beach, Calvados, France. Other sources say 24 August.
MAS 522	Kriegsmarine	World War II] The MAS 501-class MAS boat was sunk at Symi Island by British Commandos.
MAS 559	Kriegsmarine	World War II: The MAS 552-class MAS boat was sunk at Symi Island by British Commandos.
Ro-48	Imperial Japanese Navy	World War II: The Ro-35-class submarine was hedgehogged and sunk in the Pacific Ocean off the Marshall Islands (13°1′N 151°58′E) by USS Reynolds and USS Wyman (both United States Navy).
Sevellano	Spain	World War II: The sailing vessel was torpedoed, shelled and sunk at Port-Vendres, Pyrénées-Orientales, France, by HMS Universal (Royal Navy).
Stanwell	United Kingdom	World War II: The cargo ship was sunk as a breakwater for Gooseberry No. 2 off Omaha Beach, Calvados, France. Other sources say 24 August.
Suzanne	Germany	World War II: The cargo ship was torpedoed and sunk off Livadeia, Greece by HMS Vivid (Royal Navy).
Taiko Maru	Imperial Japanese Navy	World War II: The auxiliary gunboat was torpedoed and sunk in the Celebes Sea off Simisa Island (05°56′N 121°34′E) by USS Sand Lance (United States Navy).
U-415	Kriegsmarine	World War II: The Type VIIC submarine struck a mine and sank in the Bay of Biscay off Brest, Finistère, France with the loss of two crew.
V 713 Leipzig	Kriegsmarine	The Vorpostenboot was sunk on this date.

== 15 July ==
List of shipwrecks: 15 July 1944
Ship	State	Description
Director	United Kingdom	World War II: The cargo ship (5,107 GRT, 1926) was torpedoed and sunk in the Mozambique Channel (24°30′S 35°44′E) by U-198 (Kriegsmarine) with the loss of one of her 57 crew. Survivors were rescued by the sloop Goncalves Zarco (Portugal) or reached land in their lifeboat.
Hochsee	Germany	World War II: The cargo ship was torpedoed and sunk in the Baltic Sea off Steinort, Pomerania by Soviet Douglas A-20 Havoc aircraft.
Hugin	Norway	World War II: The coaster (124 GRT, 1906) was shelled and set on fire in the Barents Sea off Finnmark, Norway, then boarded by crew from by TKA-239 (Soviet Navy) with one crew member taken as a prisoner of war, two killed and two wounded. She was heavily damaged by scuttling charges, but did not sink. She was towed to Vadsø.
HMS LCT(A) 2263	Royal Navy	The Mk 5-class landing craft tank (134/286 t, 1942) was lost on this date.
Miho Maru	Japan	World War II: The cargo ship was torpedoed and sunk in the Sea of Okhotsk (48°08′N 148°06′E) by USS Skate (United States Navy). Two survivors were taken as prisoners of war.
USS PT-133	United States Navy	World War II: The ELCO 80'-class PT boat was sunk by Japanese shore batteries off Cape Pus, New Guinea.
Storegga	Germany	World War II: Combined Operation RV-6: The motorboat was damaged, possibly by TKA-239 (Soviet Navy), and lost by beaching.
Tanda	United Kingdom	World War II: The cargo liner (7,174 GRT, 1914) was torpedoed and sunk in the Arabian Sea north west of Mangalore, India (13°22′N 74°09′E) by U-181 (Kriegsmarine) with the loss of nineteen of the 216 people on board. Survivors were rescued by HMIS Bihar (Royal Indian Navy) and HMS Monkshood (Royal Navy).
TKA-239	Soviet Navy	World War II: Combined Operation RV-6: The A-1 (Vosper 72 foot)-class motor torpedo boat was shelled and damaged by sunk off Vardø, Norway, by M-31, M-251, and M-252, (all Kriegsmarine), then sunk by UJ 1211 or by R-154 and R-202 (all Kriegsmarine). Seven crewmen were killed and five taken as prisoners of war.
U-319	Kriegsmarine	World War II: The Type VIIC/41 submarine was depth charged and sunk in the North Sea south west of Lindesnes, Norway (57°40′N 5°00′E) by a Consolidated B-24 Liberator aircraft of 206 Squadron, Royal Air Force with the loss of all 51 crew.
UJ 1420 Eylau	Kriegsmarine	World War II: The naval trawler/submarine chaser was sunk in the Bay of Biscay off the Île Saint Croix, Morbihan, France by ORP Błyskawica (Polish Navy), HMCS Huron (Royal Canadian Navy) and HMS Tartar (Royal Navy).
UJ 1421 Hela	Kriegsmarine	World War II: The submarine chaser was sunk in the Bay of Biscay off the Île Saint Croix by ORP Błyskawica (Polish Navy), HMCS Huron (Royal Canadian Navy) and HMS Tartar (Royal Navy).
V 621 Mars	Kriegsmarine	World War II: The naval drifter/Vorpostenboot was sunk in the Bay of Biscay off Belle Île, Morbihan in an Allied air attack.
V 1412 Witte Zee	Kriegsmarine	World War II: The Vorpostenboot was sunk in the North Sea (52°31′N 4°28′E) in a battle with HMMTB 455, HMMTB 457, HMMTB 458, HMMTB 467, HMMTB 468, HMMTB 469 and HMMTB 470 (all Royal Navy) with the loss of 18 lives.

== 16 July ==
List of shipwrecks: 16 July 1944
Ship	State	Description
Bunzan Maru	Imperial Japanese Army	World War II: Convoy MATA-27: The Type 2A Wartime Standard cargo ship (a.k.a. Surakarta Maru and Soerakarta Maru) was bombed and sunk in the South China Sea (33°17′N 124°41′E) west of Masinloc by United States Navy aircraft. A crewman was killed.
F 273	Kriegsmarine	World War II: The Marinefährprahm was sunk in the Baltic Sea off Kotka, Finland by Soviet aircraft.
F 198	Kriegsmarine	World War II: The Marinefährprahm was sunk in the Baltic Sea off Kotka by Soviet aircraft.
Hozan Maru	Imperial Japanese Army	World War II: The 2,984-ton Standard Peacetime Type C cargo ship was set on fire by an explosion, possibly due to sabotage, of her cargo of 8,000 bbl (1,300 m^{3}) of petrol, and 20,000 bbl (3,200 m^{3}) of aviation gas, while in the port of Manila and sank with the loss of five crewmen.
Jinzen Maru	Imperial Japanese Army	World War II: Convoy TAMA-21C: The British WWI B-class standard cargo ship/troopship was torpedoed and sunk in the South China Sea (18°53′N 119°32′E) by USS Guardfish (United States Navy). Thirty-eight troops, a passenger, seven gunners, two watchmen and three crew were killed.
HMS LCT 7057	Royal Navy	The Mk 3-class landing craft tank (350/625 t, 1944) was lost on this date.
Mantai Maru	Imperial Japanese Navy	World War II: Convoy TAMA-21C: The troopship was torpedoed and sunk in the South China Sea (18°53′N 119°32′E) by USS Guardfish (United States Navy). Seventy-two troops and 43 crew were killed.
Maruko Maru	Japan	World War II: The cargo ship was sunk in the Yangtze River 4 miles (6.4 km) from Woosung, China.
Matt W Ransom	United States	World War II: The Liberty ship was sunk as a blockship as part of Gooseberry 1, Utah Beach, Manche, France.
Nikkaku Maru	Japan	World War II: The tanker was torpedoed and sunk in the Pacific Ocean by USS Skate (United States Navy).
Niobe	Kriegsmarine	Niobe World War II: The anti-aircraft ship, a former Holland-class cruiser, was bombed and sunk at Kotka, Finland by Soviet Douglas A-20 Havoc and Petlyakov Pe-2 aircraft. 70 crewmen killed. The wreck was raised and scrapped in 1953.
Nippo Maru	Japan	World War II: The cargo ship was torpedoed and sunk in thick fog in the Sea of Okhotsk (48°29′N 147°36′E) by USS Skate (United States Navy). Survivors were rescued by Dalstroy (Soviet Union).
Norjerv	United Kingdom	World War II: Operation Overlord: The cargo ship (5,582 GRT, 1919) was sunk as a blockship as part of Gooseberry 4, Juno Beach, Calvados, France. She was refloated in 1949 but broke in two on 3 June whilst under tow, with both parts sinking.
Sainei Maru	Imperial Japanese Army	World War II: Convoy TAMA-21C: The troopship was torpedoed and sunk in the South China Sea (18°53′N 119°32′E) by USS Thresher (United States Navy). Twenty-one troops and three crew were killed.
Seattle Maru	Imperial Japanese Army	World War II: Convoy TAMA-21C: The Tacoma Maru-class auxiliary troopship was torpedoed and sunk in the South China Sea (19°17′N 120°15′E) by USS Piranha (United States Navy). A total of 296 troops, 25 gunners, and 45 crew were killed. 3,489 survivors were rescued by Hiyama Maru and Shozan Maru (both Japan).
Stanwell	United Kingdom	World War II: The cargo ship was sunk as a breakwater off Arromanches, Calvados, France.
T 218	Soviet Navy	World War II: The minesweeper was torpedoed and sunk in the Baltic Sea off Narva, Estonia by a Kriegsmarine Schnellboot.
Unknown tanker	Japan	World War II: Convoy C-124: The tanker was torpedoed and sunk off north west Mindanao at (08°15′N 122°50′E) by USS Cabrilla (United States Navy). 85 crewmen survived.
V 1707 Wiking 4	Kriegsmarine	World War II: The Vorpostenboot was sunk in the Baltic Sea off Kotka by Soviet aircraft.
Zinzan Maru	Japan	World War II: The cargo ship was torpedoed and sunk in the Pacific Ocean (18°20′N 119°42′E) by USS Guardfish (United States Navy).

== 17 July ==
List of shipwrecks: 17 July 1944
Ship	State	Description
CG 60014-F	United States Coast Guard	Port Chicago disaster: The fireboat was sunk at Port Chicago, California, by the explosion of E. A. Bryan (United States).
E. A. Bryan	United States	Port Chicago disaster: The Liberty ship exploded and sank at Port Chicago, California, while ammunition was being loaded.
Hiyama Maru	Japan	World War II: Convoy TAMA-21C: The cargo ship was torpedoed and sunk in the South China Sea south west of Formosa by USS Guardfish (United States Navy). Four troops and four crewmen were killed. Survivors were rescued by W-34 and CD-1 (both Imperial Japanese Navy).
I-166	Imperial Japanese Navy	World War II: The Kaidai-class submarine was torpedoed and sunk in the Straits of Malacca (02°48′N 101°03′E) by HMS Telemachus (Royal Navy). Eighty-eight crew were killed; there were ten survivors.
Kamo Maru	Imperial Japanese Navy	World War II: The auxiliary submarine chaser was torpedoed and sunk north west of Labuan, Borneo (08°22′N 116°45′E) by USS Lapon (United States Navy).
Kurama Maru	Imperial Japanese Navy	World War II: The auxiliary submarine chaser was torpedoed and sunk off the south end of Palawan by USS Lapon (United States Navy).
HMS LCT 387	Royal Navy	World War II: The LCT Mk 1-class landing craft tank (350/625 t, 1942) was mined and sunk off the west coast of Italy.
Maya Maru	Imperial Japanese Army	World War II: Convoy C-124: The Maya Maru-class auxiliary transport was torpedoed and sunk in the Celebes Sea (07°40′N 122°03′E) off Mindanao, The Philippines by USS Cabrilla (United States Navy). Six passengers, two gunners and thirteen crewmen were killed.
Quinault Victory	United States	Quinault Victory Port Chicago disaster: The Victory ship was destroyed at Port Chicago, California, by the explosion of E. A. Bryan (United States).
Sainei Maru	Japan	World War II: Convoy TAMA-21C: The cargo ship was torpedoed and sunk in the Luzon Strait by USS Thresher (United States Navy).
Shozan Maru	Imperial Japanese Army	World War II: Convoy TAMA-21C: The Type 1C Standard cargo ship/transport (2,746 GRT 1943) (a.k.a. Shigyoku Maru) was torpedoed and sunk in the South China Sea (18°53′N 119°32′E) by USS Thresher (United States Navy). 500 Seattle Maru (Imperial Japanese Army) survivors, 125 troops, 24 gunners and 64 crewmen were killed.
U-347	Kriegsmarine	World War II: The Type VIIC submarine was depth charged and sunk in the Norwegian Sea off Narvik, Norway (68°36′N 8°33′E) by a Consolidated B-24 Liberator aircraft of 86 Squadron, Royal Air Force with the loss of all 49 crew.
U-361	Kriegsmarine	World War II: The Type VIIC submarine was depth charged and sunk in the Norwegian Sea west of Narvik (68°35′N 6°00′E) by a Consolidated PBY Catalina aircraft of 210 Squadron, Royal Air Force with the loss of all 52 crew.
V 6307 Mob-FD 2 Jupiter	Kriegsmarine	World War II: The Vorpostenboot was sunk in Norwegian waters by Soviet aircraft.
W-25	Imperial Japanese Navy	World War II: The minesweeper was torpedoed and sunk in the Pacific Ocean by USS Gabilan (United States Navy.

== 18 July ==
List of shipwrecks: 18 July 1944
Ship	State	Description
B T Co. No. 4	United States	The 59-ton, 75-foot (22.9 m) motor cargo vessel foundered in the Gulf of Alaska.
Ch-30	Imperial Japanese Navy	World War II: The submarine chaser was torpedoed and sunk in the Pacific Ocean south of Shanghai, China by USS Plaice (United States Navy).
F 498	Kriegsmarine	World War II: The Type C Marinefahrprahm was sunk in the Baltic Sea by Soviet aircraft.
I-O-97	Kriegsmarine	The Siebelgefäß landing craft was sunk on this date.
Jambi Maru	Japan	World War II: The tanker (a.k.a. Janbi Maru and Jinbi Maru) was torpedoed and sunk in the Java Sea 23 nautical miles (43 km) north of Bawean Island (05°21′S 112°30′E) by USS Ray (United States Navy). Five passengers and a guard were killed.
Kaio Maru No. 3	Japan	World War II: The cargo ship was bombed and sunk at Morotai, Netherlands East Indies by Consolidated B-24 Liberator aircraft of the United States Army Air Force.
USS LCT-209	United States Navy	World War II: The LCT Mk 5-class landing craft tank had run aground and beached in June 1944, On 18 July she was pulled off by USS Bannock and beached again on Easy White Beach. Pulled off later that day by USS Diver. Reported repaired and operational on 26 June according to an endorsement to her action report. She was towed to Dartmouth, England, arriving on 7 September. Apparently declared beyond repair and was reported stricken from the Navy Register on 11 December 1944 and scrapped. Or destroyed at Salerno, Italy by the explosion of Bushrod Washington (United States) on 15 September 1943 during the Battle of Salerno.
M-264	Kriegsmarine	World War II: The Type 1940 minesweeper was sunk west of Heligoland by British aircraft.
Nissyu Maru	Japan	World War II: Convoy 3714: The cargo ship (a.k.a. Nisshu Maru) was torpedoed and sunk in the Pacific Ocean west of Chichi Jima, Bonin Islands (28°43′N 139°24′E) by USS Cobia (United States Navy). Three crewmen, 45 gunners and 48 troops were killed. 1,247 troops, 127 navy passengers, and 74 crewmen were rescued.
R-139	Kriegsmarine	World War II: The Type R-130 minesweeper was rocketed and sunk in the North Sea off Norderney by aircraft of Coastal Command, Royal Air Force.
Rhein	Germany	World War II: The cargo ship was sunk in the North Sea off Norderney by aircraft of Coastal Command.
U-672	Kriegsmarine	World War II: The Type VIIC submarine was depth charged and sunk in the English Channel north of Guernsey, Channel Islands (50°03′N 2°30′W) by HMS Balfour (Royal Navy). All 52 crew survived.
U-742	Kriegsmarine	World War II: The Type VIIC submarine was depth charged and sunk in the Arctic Ocean (68°24′N 9°51′E) by a Consolidated PBY Catalina aircraft of 210 Squadron, Royal Air Force with the loss of all 51 crew.
Unkai Maru No. 10	Imperial Japanese Navy	World War II: Convoy 3714: The Unkai Maru No. 10-class auxiliary transport ship was torpedoed and sunk in the Pacific Ocean north west of Chichi Jima by USS Cobia (United States Navy). Nineteen crewmen were killed.

== 19 July ==
List of shipwrecks: 19 July 1944
Ship	State	Description
Angios Demitrios	Greece	World War II: The Greek Partizan armed schooner was sunk in the Ionian Sea by gunfire from shore. 21–26 crewmen killed.
Bokkai Maru	Japan	World War II: The sailing ship was bombed and sunk off Alor Island, Netherlands East Indies by North American B-25 Mitchell aircraft of the Royal Australian Air Force.
Ebisu Maru No. 53	Japan	World War II: The cargo ship was bombed and sunk off Alor Island by North American B-25 Mitchell aircraft of the Royal Australian Air Force.
Hermes	Germany	World War II: The tug was sunk in an Allied air raid on Saint-Malo, Ille-et-Vilaine, France. She was later refloated.
Hokuriku Maru No. 1	Imperial Japanese Navy	World War II: The guard ship was torpedoed and sunk in the Pacific Ocean north east of Honshu by USS Tautog (United States Navy).
I-5	Imperial Japanese Navy	World War II: The Junsen type submarine was hedgehogged and sunk in the Pacific Ocean 200 nautical miles (370 km) east of Saipan, Northern Mariana Islands by USS Wyman (United States Navy).
King Frederick	United Kingdom	World War II: The cargo ship (5,265 GRT, 1920) was torpedoed and sunk in the Arabian Sea (9°29′N 71°45′E) by U-181 (Kriegsmarine) with the loss of 27 of the 56 people on board. Survivors were rescued by Samshee (United Kingdom). The wreck was subsequently dispersed by explosives.
MAL 17	Kriegsmarine	World War II: The MAL 1A type landing fire support lighter was sunk by Soviet aircraft in Lake Peipus.
MAL 19	Kriegsmarine	World War II: The MAL 1A type landing fire support lighter was sunk by Soviet aircraft in Lake Peipus.
Ōi	Imperial Japanese Navy	World War II: The Kuma-class cruiser was torpedoed and sunk in the South China Sea (13°12′N 114°52′E) by USS Flasher (United States Navy) with the loss of 153 of her 522 crew. Survivors were rescued by Shikinami (Imperial Japanese Navy).
Teiryu Maru	Japan	World War II: The cargo ship was torpedoed, broke in two and sank in the South China Sea 440 miles (710 km) south south east of Hong Kong (19°08′N 116°13′E) by USS Guardfish (United States Navy). 108 passengers, 3 gunners, and 38 crew killed.
HMS Texas	Royal Navy	The naval trawler (301 GRT, 1919) was lost on this date.
V 713 Leipzig	Kriegsmarine	World War II: The Vorpostenboot struck a mine and sank in the Bay of Biscay off Brest, Finistère, France.
Wa 4	Imperial Japanese Navy	World War II: The No.1-class auxiliary minesweeper was bombed and sunk at Morotai, Netherlands East Indies by North American B-25 Mitchell aircraft of the Royal Australian Air Force.

== 20 July ==
List of shipwrecks: 20 July 1944
Ship	State	Description
Ceriba	Germany	World War II: The tugboat sunk by a mine in the Baltic Sea.
CH-50	Imperial Japanese Navy	World War II: The submarine chaser was bombed and heavily damaged by US Navy carrier-based aircraft in Futami Harbor, Chichi-Jima, and sank the next day. There were 16 killed and 10 wounded.
ORP Dragon	Polish Navy	World War II: The Danae-class cruiser was scuttled as a breakwater at Courseulles, Basse-Normandie, France.
Ercole	Italy	World War II: The cargo ship struck a mine and sank off Livorno. She was refloated in 1947, repaired and returned to service.
HMS Isis	Royal Navy	World War II: The I-class destroyer (1,370/1,888 t, 1937) struck a mine and sank in the English Channel off Normandy, France.
Kaio Maru No. 2	Imperial Japanese Navy	World War II: The auxiliary submarine chaser was torpedoed and sunk at Chichi-jima by USS Cobia (United States Navy).
HMS LCT 689	Royal Navy	World War II: The Mk 4-class landing craft tank (350/586 t, 1943) was lost on this date from an explosion.
HMS LCT 2337	Royal Navy	World War II: The Mk 5-class landing craft tank (134/286 t, 1942) was lost on this date in the Normandy area.
LV-105	United States Coast Guard	The lightship-turned-examination vessel was rammed and sunk off Portsmouth, Virginia.
MAL 15	Kriegsmarine	World War II: The MAL 1A type landing fire support lighter was sunk by Soviet aircraft in Lake Peipus. One crewman killed.
Mode	Sweden	World War II: The cargo ship was sunk by a mine between Pater Noster Lighthouse and Vinga (Gothenburg). Three men were killed and three of the 19 survivors were wounded.
Norfalk	Norway	World War II: Convoy EBC 45: The cargo ship (5,674 GRT, 1919) struck a mine and sank in the English Channel 2 nautical miles (3.7 km) off the coast of Normandy. All 40 crew were rescued by USS Diver (United States Navy).
Semsi-Bahri	Turkey	World War II: The sailing ship was shelled and sunk in the Black Sea by Shch-209 (Soviet Navy).
Vital de Oliveira	Brazilian Navy	World War II: The troopship was torpedoed and sunk in the South Atlantic (22°29′S 41°09′W) by U-861 (Kriegsmarine) with the loss of 100 of the 275 people on board. Survivors were rescued by the fishing vessel Guanabar (Brazil) and Javarí (Brazilian Navy).
Yusen Maru No. 3	Imperial Japanese Navy	World War II: The auxiliary submarine chaser was torpedoed and sunk at Chichi-jima by USS Cobia (United States Navy).

== 21 July ==
List of shipwrecks: 21 July 1944
Ship	State	Description
Camaqua	Brazilian Navy	The Carioca-class minelayer capsized and sank in a storm 30 nautical miles (56 km) east of Recife, Brazil (07°50′S 34°29′W).
HMS Chamois	Royal Navy	World War II: The Catherine-class minesweeper (890/1,250 t, 1943) struck a mine and was damaged in the Seine Bay. She was taken in to Portsmouth, Hampshire but was not repaired.
HMS LCT 2331	Royal Navy	World War II: The LCT Mk 5-class landing craft tank (134/286 t, 1942) broke in two in the Channel while being towed from Normandy to an English port, and was later sunk by an Allied destroyer with gunfire. The whole crew was rescued.
Libby, McNeill & Libby IV No. 1	United States	The 49-gross register ton, 60-foot (18.3 m) scow was wrecked at Dry Bay Bar (59°08′N 138°25′W) on the south-central coast of the Territory of Alaska.
M-20	Kriegsmarine	World War II: The Type 1935 minesweeper was bombed and sunk by Soviet aircraft in Narva Bay. Five crew were killed.
M-307	Kriegsmarine	World War II: The Type 1940 minesweeper was bombed, strafed and sunk in the North Sea off Langeoog (53°30′N 7°36′E) by Bristol Beaufighter aircraft of Coastal Command, Royal Air Force.
M-413	Kriegsmarine	World War II: The Type 1940 minesweeper was bombed by Soviet aircraft in Narva Bayand and either sunk, or run aground and abandoned.
Orient	Finland	World War II: The cargo ship was sunk in the North Sea north of Spiekeroog, Lower Saxony, Germany by Bristol Beaufighter aircraft of Coastal Command.
Peking Maru	Imperial Japanese Navy	World War II: Convoy YUTA-09: The auxiliary gunboat ran aground at Vigan Point near North San Fernando, Luzon (17°31′N 120°2′E). On 28 July she was torpedoed and damaged by USS Aspro (United States Navy) and was abandoned.
U-212	Kriegsmarine	World War II: The Type VIIC submarine was depth charged and sunk in the English Channel south of Brighton, Sussex, United Kingdom (50°27′N 0°13′W) by HMS Curzon and HMS Ekins (both Royal Navy) with the loss of all 49 crew.
UJ 2211 Hardy	Kriegsmarine	World War II: The naval trawler/submarine chaser was torpedoed and sunk in the Mediterranean Sea south east of Cap Camarat, Var, France by HMS Ultor (Royal Navy).
V 1111 Christian Wendig	Kriegsmarine	World War II: The Vorpostenboot was bombed and severely damaged in the North Sea north of Spiekeroog by Bristol Beaufighter aircraft of Coast Command. She was subsequently bombed and sunk in the Jade Bight.

== 22 July ==
List of shipwrecks: 22 July 1944
Ship	State	Description
F 273	Kriegsmarine	World War II: The Type CM minelayer Marinefahrprahm was sunk in the Baltic Sea by Soviet aircraft.
M 3413 Petronella	Kriegsmarine	World War II: The minesweeper was sunk in the North Sea in an attack by Royal Navy Motor Torpedo Boats.
V 810 Falkland	Kriegsmarine	World War II: The Vorpostenboot was torpedoed and sunk in the North Sea off the coast of Land Wursten, Lower Saxony by aircraft of Coastal Command, Royal Air Force. Her crew lost 4 dead, 24 missing and 15 wounded.
V 812 Amtsgerichtsrat Pitschke	Kriegsmarine	World War II: The Vorpostenboot was torpedoed and sunk in the North Sea off the coast of Land Wursten, Lower Saxony by aircraft of Coastal Command, Royal Air Force. She has been attacked the day before and damaged (with losses of 2 dead and 11 wounded) and was under tow of V 810 Falkland. Losses during this second attack and the sinking were 2 missing and 16 wounded.

== 23 July ==
List of shipwrecks: 23 July 1944
Ship	State	Description
Empire Beatrice	United Kingdom	World War II: The cargo ship (7,046 GRT, 1942) was torpedoed by E-boats (Kriegsmarine) and beached at Dungeness, Kent. She was later repaired and returned to service with a new stern section.
Empire Bittern	United Kingdom	World War II: The ocean liner (8,546 GRT, 1902) was sunk as a blockship off Normandy, France.
F 253	Kriegsmarine	The Type A Marinefahrprahm was sunk on this date.
Kiso Maru	Japan	World War II: The coaster was torpedoed and sunk at "Port Owen" by HMS Storm (Royal Navy).
HMS LCT 1023	Royal Navy	The Mk 4-class landing craft tank (350/586 t, 1943) was sunk on this date, raised, repaired, returned to service.

== 24 July ==
List of shipwrecks: 24 July 1944
Ship	State	Description
AF 96	Kriegsmarine	World War II: The D Type Artilleriefährprahm struck a mine and was severely damaged in the North Sea off Zeebrugge, West Flanders, Belgium. She was declared a total loss.
Asahisan Maru	Imperial Japanese Navy	World War II: The Asahisan Maru-class transport was bombed and sunk in very shallow water in Kau Bay, Halmahera, New Guinea, by Consolidated B-24 Liberator aircraft of the United States Fifth Air Force. Two crewmen were killed.
Auk	United Kingdom	World War II: The cargo ship (1,338 GRT, 1921) struck a mine and sank in the Adriatic Sea off Ancona, Italy.
Axel	Germany	World War II: The cargo ship was bombed and sunk at Kiel, Schleswig Holstein in a British air raid.
Erwin Wassenar	Kriegsmarine	World War II: The submarine tender was bombed and sunk at Kiel in a British air raid.
General Osorio	Kriegsmarine	World War II: The accommodation ship was bombed at Kiel in a British air raid. The afterpart was burnt out and sank. She was refloated on 2 October.
HMS Goathland	Royal Navy	World War II: The Hunt-class destroyer (1,050/1,490 t, 1942) struck a mine and was damaged in the Seine Bay. She was taken in to Portsmouth, Hampshire but was not repaired.
HMS LCT 901	Royal Navy	The Mk 4-class landing craft tank (350/586 t, 1943) was lost on this date.
Merignac	Germany	World War II: The coastal tanker was bombed and sunk at Kiel in a British air raid.
HMS MTB 372	Royal Navy	World War II: The Vosper 72'-class motor torpedo boat (37/45 t, 1943) sunk by Kriegsmarine surface ships in the Adriatic Sea off Cape Loviste, Yugoslavia.
Nordstern	Germany	World War II: The tanker was bombed and sunk in the Gironde at Donges, Loire-Inférieure, France by Allied aircraft. She was refloated on 17 August 1947 and subsequently scrapped.
Portsea	United Kingdom	World War II: The cargo ship (1,583 GRT, 1938) struck a mine and sank in the Adriatic Sea off Ancona (43°28′25″N 13°44′15″E) with the loss of 25 of her 29 crew.
Samneva	United Kingdom	World War II: Convoy FTM 47: The Liberty ship (7,219 GRT, 1943) was torpedoed and damaged in the English Channel (50°14′N 0°47′W) by U-309 (Kriegsmarine). All 70 crew survived. She was beached at Southampton, Hampshire but was declared a total loss when she broke in two. The bow section was scrapped in situ, the stern section was scrapped at Briton Ferry, Glamorgan in 1947.
Sperrbrecher 25 Ingrid Horn	Kriegsmarine	World War II: The Sperrbrecher was bombed and sunk at Kiel in a British air raid. Three of her crew were killed. She was later refloated and scrapped.
Tonan Maru	Imperial Japanese Navy	The auxiliary submarine chaser was sunk on this date.
Treene	Germany	World War II: The coastal tanker was bombed and sunk at Kiel in a British air raid.
U-239	Kriegsmarine	World War II: The Type VIIC submarine was bombed and damaged at Kiel in a British air raid. She was stricken on 5 August and consequently scrapped.
U-1164	Kriegsmarine	World War II: The Type VIIC/41 submarine was bombed and sunk at Kiel in a British air raid.
V 209 Dr. Rudolf Wahrendorff	Kriegsmarine	World War II: The Vorpostenboot was sunk by Grumman Avenger aircraft of 850 Naval Air Squadron, Fleet Air Arm off St Peter Port, Guernsey, Channel Islands (49°27′N 2°32′W) with the loss of 26 crew.
William Gaston	United States	World War II: The Liberty ship was torpedoed and sunk in the Atlantic Ocean 150 miles (240 km) north east of Florianópolis, Brazil (26°42′S 46°12′W) by U-861 (Kriegsmarine). All 26 gunners and 41 crewmen were rescued on 25 July by USS Matagorda (United States Navy).

== 25 July ==
List of shipwrecks: 25 July 1944
Ship	State	Description
F 595	Kriegsmarine	The Type C2 Marinefahrprahm was sunk on this date.
Mercurius	Merivoimat	World War II: Continuation War: The Silma-class minesweeper was torpedoed and sunk at Porkkala by Soviet Douglas A-20 Havoc aircraft.
Robin Goodfellow	United States	World War II: The cargo ship was torpedoed and sunk in the South Atlantic (20°03′S 14°21′W) by U-862 (Kriegsmarine) with the loss of all 68 crew.
Showa Maru No. 5 GO	Imperial Japanese Navy	The auxiliary submarine chaser was sunk on this date.
Sokuten	Imperial Japanese Navy	World War II: The Sokuten-class minelayer was sunk 30 nautical miles (56 km) north east of Babelthaup, Palau (7°20′N 134°27′E) when three strafing Grumman F6F Hellcat aircraft from USS San Jacinto (United States Navy) detonated her load of mines.
Trapez 5	Germany	World War II: The tanker was bombed and ran aground at Genoa, Italy. She was later refloated.
Vilppula	Merivoimat	World War II: Continuation War: The Rautu-class minesweeper was torpedoed and sunk at Porkkala by Soviet Douglas A-20 Havoc aircraft.

== 26 July ==
List of shipwrecks: 26 July 1944
Ship	State	Description
Aki Maru	Imperial Japanese Army	World War II: Convoy HI-68: The Miike Maru-class auxiliary transport ship was torpedoed and damaged in the South China Sea north west of Luzon, Philippines by USS Flasher (United States Navy). 12 gunners were killed, but the ship was able to sail on. Two and a quarter hours later Flasher torpedoed and sank her at 18°15′N 118°00′E. A total of 24 troops and passengers, fourteen gunners and three crewmen were killed.
Hyydakerim	Turkey	World War II: The schooner shelled and sunk in the Black Sea by ShCh-209 (Soviet Navy). Seven crewmen were captured.
I-29	Imperial Japanese Navy	World War II: The B1 type submarine was torpedoed and sunk in the Balintang Channel (20°06′N 121°33′E) by USS Sawfish (United States Navy) with the loss of all but one of her 101 crew.
Otorisan Maru	Japan	World War II: Convoy HI-68: The Standard Type 1TM tanker was torpedoed, blew up and sank in the South China Sea north west of Luzon (18°15′N 118°00′E) by USS Flasher (United States Navy). Forty-six crewmen were killed.
USS Robalo	United States Navy	World War II: The Gato-class submarine struck a mine and sank in the Balabec Straights in 70m of water (2 nautical miles (3.7 km) east of Balabec Island, with the loss of 56 of her 60 crew. Four survivors reached shore and were captured by Military Police, placed aboard a destroyer for transportation and were never seen again.
Ryojun Maru	Imperial Japanese Navy	The auxiliary submarine chaser was sunk on this date.
Showa Maru No. 3 GO	Imperial Japanese Navy	The auxiliary submarine chaser was sunk on this date.
T-1	Imperial Japanese Navy	World War II: Operation Snapshot: The No.1-class landing ship was bombed and damaged by aircraft from USS Lexington (United States Navy) off the entrance to Malakal Harbor, Palau. She was bombed and sunk by aircraft from USS Lexington and USS Bunker Hill (both United States Navy) (7°30′N 134°30′E) the next day.
T-150	Imperial Japanese Navy	World War II: Operation Snapshot: The No.101-class landing ship was bombed and damaged in Karamadoo Bay, Babelthaup, Palau, (7°30′N 134°30′E) by aircraft from USS Lexington (United States Navy). She was bombed and sunk by aircraft from USS Bunker Hill (United States Navy) off Nargarol Island (7°30′N 134°30′E) the next day.
Tosan Maru	Imperial Japanese Army	World War II: Convoy HI-68: The Tosan Maru-class auxiliary transport was torpedoed and damaged in the South China Sea north west of Luzon (18°15′N 118°00′E) by USS Flasher (United States Navy). Torpedoed again and further damaged by USS Crevalle (United States Navy). Tosan Maru sank the next day when fire ignited shells and depth charges. 18 passengers, 8 gunners and 9 crewmen were killed.
U-214	Kriegsmarine	World War II: The Type VIIC submarine was depth charged and sunk in the English Channel (49°58′N 3°30′W) by HMS Cooke (Royal Navy) with the loss of all 48 crew.
U-2323	Kriegsmarine	World War II: The Type XXIII submarine struck a mine and sank off Kiel, Schleswig-Holstein (54°23′N 10°11′E) with the loss of two of her fourteen crew. She was raised in 1945, but was still under repair when the war ended and was subsequently scrapped.

== 27 July ==
List of shipwrecks: 27 July 1944
Ship	State	Description
Ataka Maru	Imperial Japanese Navy	The auxiliary minesweeper was sunk on this date.
Empire Beatrice	United Kingdom	World War II: The cargo ship was torpedoed by Schnellboote in the Straits of Dover (50°55′N 01°02′E) losing her stern. She was beached at Dungeness. Later refloated, repaired and returned to service.
F 424	Kriegsmarine	The Type CM minelayer Marinefahrprahm was sunk on this date.
F 811	Kriegsmarine	World War II: The Type D Marinefährprahm was torpedoed and sunk in the Mediterranean Sea off La Ciotat, Bouches-du-Rhône, France by HMS Ultimatum (Royal Navy).
Kyoei Maru No. 2	Japan	World War II: The tanker was torpedoed and sunk in the Moro Gulf south of Zamboanga City, Philippines by USS Dace (United States Navy). Five crewmen were killed.
MAL 13	Kriegsmarine	World War II: The MAL 1A type landing fire support lighter was sunk by Soviet aircraft in Lake Peipus.
HMS MTB 412	Royal Navy	World War II: The BPB 72'-class motor torpedo boat (43/53 t, 1942) collided with the sinking wreck of HMS MTB 430 (Royal Navy) during a battle in the Seine Bay off Normandy, France, and sank.
HMS MTB 430	Royal Navy	World War II: The motor torpedo boat (43/53 t, 1942) was sunk in Seine Bay in a head-on collision with S 182 (Kriegsmarine) during a battle.
HMT Maaløy	Royal Navy	World War II: The naval trawler was torpedoed and sunk in the Indian Ocean off Ceylon (5°25′N 77°32′E) by U-510 (Kriegsmarine). (Look 27/03/1944)
S 182	Kriegsmarine	World War II: The Schnellboot was scuttled in Straits of Dover/Seine Bay due to damage sustained from a head-on collision with HMS MTB 430 (Royal Navy) during a battle. Eight crew were killed and 17 captured.
No. 1	Imperial Japanese Navy	World War II: The No.1-class landing ship was sunk in the Pacific Ocean off Palau by aircraft based on USS Bunker Hill and USS Lexington (both United States Navy).
Rochester	United Kingdom	World War II: The 104.2-foot (31.8 m), 165-ton trawler was sunk by a mine 27 miles (43 km) east northeast of Withernsea Lighthouse. Eleven crew were killed, with one survivor.
T-150	Imperial Japanese Navy	World War II: The transport was sunk in the Pacific Ocean off Palau by aircraft based on USS Bunker Hill and USS Lexington (both United States Navy).
Tabarka	United Kingdom	World War II: The Admiralty-requisitioned cargo ship (2,886 GRT, 1909), originally scuttled in Kirk Sound, Scapa Flow as a blockship in 1941, was refloated and moved to Burra Sound and resunk.
V-1	Soviet Navy	World War II: The S-class submarine was bombed and sunk off Norway by a Royal Air Force Consolidated B-24 Liberator bomber in error when she dived instead of firing recognition signals as instructed before sailing.
Vega	Germany	World War II: The auxiliary sailing vessel was sunk in the Adriatic Sea by HMMGB 651, HMMGB 667 and HMMG 670 (all Royal Navy).

== 28 July ==
List of shipwrecks: 28 July 1944
Ship	State	Description
Beijing Maru	Imperial Japanese Navy	World War II: The auxiliary gunboat was torpedoed and sunk in Lingayen Gulf by USS Aspro (United States Navy).
Hakubasan Maru	Japan	World War II: Convoy HI-68: The tanker ship was torpedoed and sunk in the South China Sea north west of Luzon, Philippines (16°28′N 119°38′E) by USS Crevalle (United States Navy). Three crewmen were killed.
NB-8 Kornat	Yugoslav Partisans	World War II: The gunboat accidentally ran aground, her crew set her afire to prevent capture.
HMS LCP(R) 971	Royal Navy	The landing craft personnel (ramped) was lost on this date.
M 4457 C.P.Andersen	Kriegsmarine	World War II: The auxiliary minesweeper was bombed and sunk in the Gironde Estuary by aircraft of Coastal Command, Royal Air Force.
Peking Maru	Imperial Japanese Navy	The auxiliary gunboat was lost on this date.
U-1166	Kriegsmarine	The Type VIIC/41 submarine was severely damaged by the explosion of a torpedo. She was consequently stricken from the Kriegsmarine register on 28 August and was scuttled at Kiel, Schleswig-Holstein in May 1945.

== 29 July ==
List of shipwrecks: 29 July 1944
Ship	State	Description
Emsriff	Germany	World War II: The cargo ship was sunk at Hamburg in a British air raid. She was refloated in 1947, repaired in 1950 and entered West German service.
Kannon Maru I-Go	Imperial Japanese Navy	World War II: The guard ship was torpedoed and sunk off the Philippines by USS Perch (United States Navy).
HMT Lord Wakefield	Royal Navy	World War II: The naval trawler (418 GRT, 1933) was bombed and sunk off Omaha Beach, Normandy by Luftwaffe aircraft.
HMS Prince Leopold	Royal Navy	World War II: The landing ship infantry (small) (2,938 GRT, 1930) was torpedoed and sunk in the English Channel off the coast of Normandy, France (50°19′N 0°53′W) by U-621 (Kriegsmarine) with the loss of seventeen lives.
Sana Maru	Japan	World War II: The ship, being operated as a tug, was bombed and sunk in Yulin Harbor by North American B-25 Mitchell aircraft of the United States Army Air Force.
T2 and T7	Kriegsmarine	World War II: The Type 35 torpedo boats were bombed and sunk at Bremen in an American air raid. They were salvaged in September and October, respectively, but not repaired; scrapped in 1946.
U-872	Kriegsmarine	World War II: The Type IXD2 submarine was bombed and severely damaged at Bremen in an American air raid with the loss of one crew member. She was consequently withdrawn from service and scrapped.
U-890	Germany	World War II: The Type IXC/40 submarine was severely damaged in an American air raid on Bremen. She was not commissioned.
U-891	Germany	World War II: The Type IXC/40 submarine was severely damaged in an American air raid on Bremen. She was not commissioned.
V 627	Kriegsmarine	World War II: The Vorpostenboot was sunk in the Bay of Biscay off La Pallice, Charente-Maritime, France by aircraft of Coastal Command, Royal Air Force.
Z44	Germany	World War II: The Type 1936B destroyer was heavily damaged in an air raid, prior to commissioning. Scrapped 1948–49.

== 30 July ==
List of shipwrecks: 30 July 1944
Ship	State	Description
Braconburn	United Kingdom	The trawler, a sold off Strath-class naval trawler, was sunk in a collision with LeBaron Russell Briggs (United States) off Bell Rock, Arborath (56°35′N 02°10′W). Six crew were killed.
Kokuyō Maru	Japan	World War II: The Kawasaki-type oiler was torpedoed and sunk in the Sulu Sea north east of Borneo (6°03′N 119°54′E) by USS Bonefish (United States Navy). Nine crewmen were killed.
KT-355	Soviet Navy	The KM-4-class river minesweeping launch was sunk on this date.
KT-804	Soviet Navy	World War II: The R Type coastal minesweeper was torpedoed and sunk in Narva Bay by U-481 (Kriegsmarine).
KT-807	Soviet Navy	World War II: The R Type coastal minesweeper was torpedoed and sunk in Narva Bay by U-481 (Kriegsmarine).
M 455	Kriegsmarine	World War II: The Type 1940 minesweeper was bombed and sunk at Hamburg in an American air raid. Raised 26 August 1944, repaired, and returned to service.
Mansai Maru	Japan	World War II: The cargo ship was bombed and sunk in the Pacific Ocean by Consolidated B-24 Liberator aircraft of the United States Army Air Force.
MO-105	Soviet Navy	World War II: The MO-4 Type submarine chaser was torpedoed and sunk in the Gulf of Finland (60°25′N 28°30′E) by U-250 (Kriegsmarine) with the loss of nineteen of her 26 crew.
No. 323	Soviet Navy	The KM-4-class river minesweeping launch was sunk on this date.
Samwake	United Kingdom	World War II: The Liberty ship (7,219 GRT, 1944) was torpedoed and sunk in the English Channel (50°40′N 0°31′E) by a Kriegsmarine Schnellboot.
TK-161	Soviet Navy	The G-5-class motor torpedo boat was lost on this date.
U-250	Kriegsmarine	World War II: The Type VIIC submarine was depth charged and sunk in the Gulf of Finland (60°28′N 28°25′E) by MO-103 (Soviet Navy) with the loss of 46 of her 52 crew. Raised by the Soviets in September, 1944 and towed to Kronstadt. Commissioned into the Soviet Navy as TS-4 from April to August 1945, later broken up.
USS YMS-304	United States Navy	World War II: The YMS-1-class minesweeper struck a mine and sank off Saint-Vaast-la-Hougue, Manche, France (49°33′N 01°14′W).

== 31 July ==
List of shipwrecks: 31 July 1944
Ship	State	Description
Dakar Maru	Imperial Japanese Army	World War II: Convoy MI-11: The Delagoa Maru-class transport was torpedoed and damaged in the South China Sea north west of Luzon, Philippines (18°57′N 120°50′E) by USS Steelhead (United States Navy). She was towed to San Fernando, Luzon, and abandoned.
Exmouth	United States	World War II: The cargo ship struck a mine and sank in the North Sea east of Dundee, Perthshire, United Kingdom (56°30′16″N 2°36′30″W).
Fuso Maru	Imperial Japanese Army	World War II: Convoy MI-11: The Fuso Maru-class auxiliary transport was torpedoed and sunk in the South China Sea north west of Luzon by USS Steelhead (United States Navy) 280 miles (450 km) north north west of Cape Mayraira, Luzon. A total of 1,316 troops, 12 other passengers and 22 crewmen were killed.
Koei Maru	Imperial Japanese Navy	World War II: Convoy MI-11: The tanker was torpedoed and sunk by USS Parche (United States Navy) 280 miles (450 km) north north west of Cape Mayraira, Luzon. About 150 troops and nine crewmen were killed.
Manko Maru	Imperial Japanese Navy	World War II: Convoy MI-11: The Senko Maru-class auxiliary transport (a.k.a. Banko Maru) was torpedoed and sunk in the Luzon Strait in the South China Sea by USS Parche (United States Navy). About 260 passengers, 17 crewmen and 20 gunners were killed.
MO-101	Soviet Navy	World War II: The MO-class patrol boat was torpedoed and sunk in the Björkö Sound in the Gulf of Finland (60°15′N 28°48′E) by U-370 (Kriegsmarine). 18 crewmen were killed.
Peking Maru	Imperial Japanese Navy	World War II: The auxiliary gunboat ran aground on Vigan Point, Luzon (17°31′N 120°22′E) on 21 July 1944. On 31 July she was torpedoed and damaged further by USS Aspro (United States Navy) and was consequently abandoned.
Samwake	United Kingdom	World War II: The Liberty ship was torpedoed and sunk in the English Channel off Eastbourne, Sussex by S 91, S 97 and S 114 (all Kriegsmarine).
Tinshin Maru	Japan	World War II: Convoy SHIMA-02: The Standard Wartime Type 1TM tanker (a.k.a. Tenshin Maru) was torpedoed and sunk in the Palawan Passage by USS Lapon (United States Navy). All 44 crewmen were killed.
U-333	Kriegsmarine	World War II: The Type VIIC submarine was sunk in the Atlantic Ocean west of the Isles of Scilly by HMS Loch Killin and HMS Starling (both Royal Navy).
Yoshino Maru	Imperial Japanese Army	World War II: Convoy MI-11: The Yoshino Maru-class auxiliary transport was torpedoed and sunk 280 nautical miles (520 km) north north west of Cape Mayraira, Luzon by USS Parche (United States Navy). A total of 2,442 troops, eighteen gunners and 35 crewmen were killed.

== Unknown date ==
List of shipwrecks: Unknown date 1944
Ship	State	Description
Ettore	Germany	World War II: The cargo ship was scuttled as a blockship at Livorno, Italy. She was refloated post-war and scrapped.
F 360	Kriegsmarine	World War II: The Type A Marinefährprahm was lost in the Black Sea in action against Soviet forces between 1 and 11 November 1943 or 3 July 1944 in Italian waters. Salvaged and put in service as MTC 1107 (Italian Navy) May 1950.
I-55	Imperial Japanese Navy	World War II: The C3-class submarine was either sunk in the Pacific Ocean (15°18′N 144°26′E by USS William C. Miller (United States Navy) on 14 July, or hedgedhogged and sunk in the Pacific Ocean 200 nautical miles (370 km) east of Saipan, Northern Mariana Islands by USS Reynolds and USS Wyman (both United States Navy) on 28 July. Lost with all 112 hands.
HMS LCA 54	Royal Navy	The landing craft assault was lost sometime in July.
HMS LCA 171, HMS LCA 208, HMS LCA 208, HMS LCA 279, HMS LCA 289, HMS LCA 303, HMS LCA 320, HMS LCA 337, HMS LCA 339, HMS LCA 341, HMS LCA 349, HMS LCA 350, HMS LCA 352, HMS LCA 360, HMS LCA 367, HMS LCA 383, HMS LCA 387, HMS LCA 401, HMS LCA 409, HMS LCA 418, HMS LCA 424, HMS LCA 431, HMS LCA 434, HMS LCA 442, HMS LCA 458, HMS LCA 462, HMS LCA 463, HMS LCA 476, HMS LCA 485, HMS LCA 494, HMS LCA 496, HMS LCA 503, HMS LCA 509, HMS LCA 518, HMS LCA 519, HMS LCA 520, HMS LCA 522, HMS LCA 525, HMS LCA 530, HMS LCA 535, HMS LCA 540, HMS LCA 566, HMS LCA 579, HMS LCA 581, HMS LCA 584, HMS LCA 586, HMS LCA 588, HMS LCA 589, HMS LCA 590, HMS LCA 592, HMS LCA 593, HMS LCA 594, HMS LCA 611, HMS LCA 613, HMS LCA 623, HMS LCA 637, HMS LCA 642, HMS LCA 649, HMS LCA 650, HMS LCA 651, HMS LCA 652, HMS LCA 655, HMS LCA 661, HMS LCA 664, HMS LCA 665, HMS LCA(HR) 671, HMS LCA(HR) 672, HMS LCA(HR) 673, HMS LCA 683, HMS LCA(HR) 690, HMS LCA 691, HMS LCA 692, HMS LCA 704, HMS LCA 705, HMS LCA 710, HMS LCA 713, HMS LCA 717, HMS LCA 721, HMS LCA 729, HMS LCA 731, HMS LCA 738, HMS LCA 748, HMS LCA 750, HMS LCA 768, HMS LCA 775, HMS LCA 779, HMS LCA 780, HMS LCA 788, HMS LCA 791, HMS LCA 791, HMS LCA 792, HMS LCA 795, HMS LCA 796, HMS LCA 797, HMS LCA 803, HMS LCA 808, HMS LCA 809, HMS LCA 810, HMS LCA 812, HMS LCA 814, HMS LCA 815, HMS LCA 821, HMS LCA 825, HMS LCA 827, HMS LCA 835, HMS LCA 849, HMS LCA 853, HMS LCA 857, HMS LCA 859, HMS LCA 860, HMS LCA 867, HMS LCA 869, HMS LCA 870, HMS LCA 871, HMS LCA 879, HMS LCA 881, HMS LCA 886, HMS LCA 900, HMS LCA 903, HMS LCA 911, HMS LCA 913, HMS LCA 914, HMS LCA 918, HMS LCA 919, HMS LCA 920, HMS LCA 929, HMS LCA 933, HMS LCA 946, HMS LCA 949, HMS LCA 958, HMS LCA(HR) 965, HMS LCA 978, HMS LCA 984, HMS LCA 998, HMS LCA 999, HMS LCA 1000, HMS LCA 1005, HMS LCA 1008, HMS LCA 1013, HMS LCA 1016, HMS LCA 1021, HMS LCA 1024, HMS LCA 1026, HMS LCA 1027, HMS LCA 1028, HMS LCA 1034, HMS LCA 1050, HMS LCA 1057, HMS LCA 1058, HMS LCA 1059, HMS LCA 1063, HMS LCA 1068, HMS LCA 1069, HMS LCA 1074, HMS LCA 1082, HMS LCA 1086, HMS LCA 1088, HMS LCA 1091, HMS LCA 1093, HMS LCA 1096, HMS LCA 1129, HMS LCA 1131, HMS LCA 1131, HMS LCA 1132, HMS LCA 1137, HMS LCA 1138, HMS LCA 1143, HMS LCA 1144, HMS LCA 1146, HMS LCA 1149, HMS LCA 1150, HMS LCA 1151, HMS LCA 1155, HMS LCA 1156, HMS LCA 1213, HMS LCA 1215, HMS LCA 1216, HMS LCA 1251, HMS LCA 1252, HMS LCA 1253, HMS LCA 1256, HMS LCA 1338, HMS LCA 1339, HMS LCA 1340, HMS LCA 1341, HMS LCA 1343, HMS LCA 1372, HMS LCA 1379, HMS LCA 1381, HMS LCA 1382, HMS LCA 1383	Royal Navy	The landing craft assault was lost sometime in June or July.
HMS LCM 127, HMS LCM 128, HMS LCM 165, HMS LCM 168, HMS LCM 180, HMS LCM 191, HMS LCM 203, HMS LCM 216, HMS LCM 226, HMS LCM 229, HMS LCM 231, HMS LCM 241, HMS LCM 251, HMS LCM 281, HMS LCM 316, HMS LCM 319, HMS LCM 330, HMS LCM 335, HMS LCM 337, HMS LCM 377, HMS LCM 382, HMS LCM 383, HMS LCM 408, HMS LCM 409, HMS LCM 419, HMS LCM 421, HMS LCM 425, HMS LCM 443, HMS LCM 444, HMS LCM 466, HMS LCM 531, HMS LCM 535, HMS LCM 568, HMS LCM 587, HMS LCM 627, HMS LCM 628, HMS LCM 631, HMS LCM 641, HMS LCM 908, HMS LCM 929, HMS LCM 1053, HMS LCM 1059, HMS LCM 1062, HMS LCM 1088, HMS LCM 1098, HMS LCM 1108, HMS LCM 1120, HMS LCM 1127, HMS LCM 1128, HMS LCM 1139, HMS LCM 1145, HMS LCM 1146, HMS LCM 1161, HMS LCM 1175, HMS LCM 1189, HMS LCM 1197, HMS LCM 1200, HMS LCM 1207, HMS LCM 1208, HMS LCM 1212, HMS LCM 1220, HMS LCM 1221, HMS LCM 1227, HMS LCM 1232, HMS LCM 1233, HMS LCM 1240, HMS LCM 1244, HMS LCM 1278, HMS LCM 1282, HMS LCM 1293, HMS LCM 1297, HMS LCM 1397,	Royal Navy	The landing craft medium was lost sometime in June or July.
HMS LCP(L) 21, HMS LCP(L) 22, HMS LCP(L) 23, HMS LCP(L) 40, HMS LCP(L) 51, HMS LCP(L) 121, HMS LCP(L) 132, HMS LCP(L) 139, HMS LCP(L) 170, HMS LCP(L) 175, HMS LCP(L) 176, HMS LCP(L) 187, HMS LCP(L) 189, HMS LCP(L) 197, HMS LCP(L) 199, HMS LCP(L) 208, HMS LCP(L) 272, HMS LCP(L) 280, HMS LCP(L) 282, HMS LCP(L) 285, HMS LCP(L) 286, HMS LCP(L) 289, HMS LCP(L) 309, HMS LCP(L) 312, HMS LCP(L) 528, HMS LCP(L) 556	Royal Navy	The landing craft personnel (large) was lost sometime in June or July.
HMS LCP(L) 229, HMS LCP(L) 298, HMS LCP(L) 299, HMS LCP(L) 300, HMS LCP(L) 303, HMS LCP(L) 304, HMS LCP(L) 305, HMS LCP(L) 308, HMS LCP(L) 310	Royal Navy	The landing craft personnel (large) was lost sometime in July.
HMS LCP(R) 683	Royal Navy	The landing craft personnel (ramped) was lost sometime in July.
Palermo	Italy	World War II: The cargo ship was bombed and sunk by aircraft at Fiume, Italy.
Securitas	Germany	World War II: The cargo ship was scuttled at Livorno, Italy. She was later raised but declared a constructive total loss.
Valdirosa	Germany	World War II: The cargo ship was scuttled as a blockship at Livorno. She was refloated in 1945 and scrapped.
Two unknown submarines	Imperial Japanese Navy	World War II: Battle of Saipan: The midget submarines were destroyed by their crews sometime between 12 June and 8 July 1944. All crew were killed during the battle, probably fighting as infantry.
