= USS Hoe =

Ship of the United States Navy named for the hoe shark

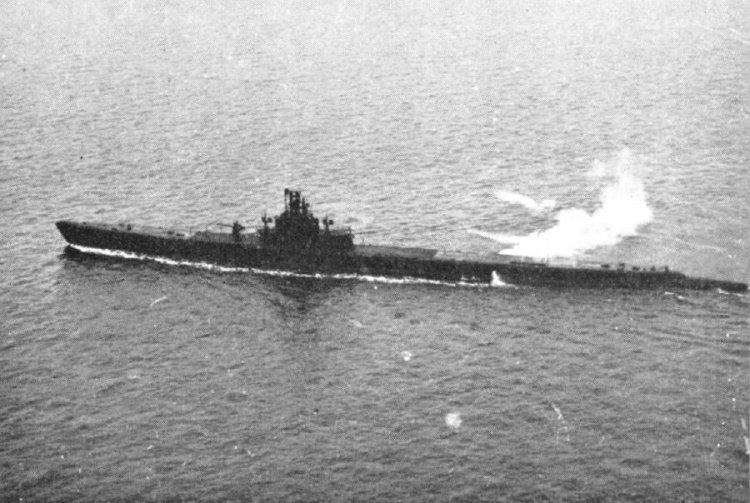
- Hoe (SS-258) underway, 16 February 1943

History

United States
- Builder: Electric Boat Company, Groton, Connecticut
- Laid down: 2 January 1942
- Launched: 17 September 1942
- Sponsored by: Miss Helen Hess
- Commissioned: 16 December 1942
- Decommissioned: 7 August 1946
- Stricken: 1 May 1960
- Fate: Sold for scrap, 10 September 1960

General characteristics
- Class & type: Gato-class diesel-electric submarine
- Displacement: 1,525 long tons (1,549 t) surfaced; 2,424 long tons (2,463 t) submerged
- Length: 311 ft 9 in (95.02 m)
- Beam: 27 ft 3 in (8.31 m)
- Draft: 17 ft 0 in (5.18 m) maximum
- Propulsion: 4 × Hooven-Owens-Rentschler (H.O.R.) diesel engines driving electrical generators; 2 × 126-cell Sargo batteries; 4 × high-speed Allis-Chalmers electric motors with reduction gears; two propellers; 5,400 shp (4.0 MW) surfaced; 2,740 shp (2.0 MW) submerged
- Speed: 21 kn (39 km/h) surfaced; 9 kn (17 km/h) submerged
- Range: 11,000 nmi (20,000 km) surfaced at 10 kn (19 km/h)
- Endurance: 48 hours at 2 knots (4 km/h) submerged; 75 days on patrol
- Test depth: 300 ft (90 m)
- Complement: 6 officers, 54 enlisted
- Armament: 10 × 21-inch (533 mm) torpedo tubes; 6 forward, 4 aft; 24 torpedoes; 1 × 3-inch (76 mm) / 50 caliber deck gun; Bofors 40 mm and Oerlikon 20 mm cannon

USS Hoe (SS-258), a Gato-class submarine, was a ship of the United States Navy named for the hoe, one of various sharks, especially the dogfish.

== Construction and commissioning ==
Hoe's keel was laid down by the Electric Boat Company at Groton, Connecticut, on 2 January 1942. She was launched on 17 September 1942, sponsored by Miss Helen Hess, and commissioned on 16 December 1942.

== First and second war patrols, May – October 1943 ==
After shakedown, Hoe sailed 19 April 1943 via the Panama Canal to Pearl Harbor, where she arrived 15 May. She departed on her first combat war patrol 27 May, and patrolled the Guam-Palaus area. Hoe damaged two freighters before returning 11 July to Pearl Harbor via Ulithi and Midway Atoll.

Hoe's second patrol, conducted west of Truk, was marred by considerable engine trouble. The submarine departed 21 August, damaged one tanker, and eluded several depth charge attacks before returning to Pearl Harbor 18 October 1943. She also took part in the search for downed aviators off Wake Island, 8–9 October.

== Third, fourth, and fifth war patrols, January – August 1944 ==
Following extensive repairs, Hoe set out on her third patrol 26 January 1944. Patrolling between Mindanao and Halmahera, the submarine made an attack 16 February which damaged one ship. Although shadowed by escort vessels, Hoe detected another convoy 25 February and in two separate attacks sank tanker Nissho Maru. She returned to Fremantle, Australia on 5 March for refit and training.

Hoe began her fourth war patrol from Fremantle 4 April, and operated in the South China Sea, the vital Japanese sea supply line. She attacked a convoy 8 May, but scored no hits. Two more attacks 17 May and 19 May resulted in several damaged freighters and severe retaliatory depth charge attacks on Hoe. She returned to Fremantle 2 June 1944. Her fifth war patrol, in the same area, was conducted between 29 June and 23 August 1944.

== Sixth and seventh war patrols, September 1944 – January 1945 ==
The veteran submarine sailed on her sixth patrol 15 September as leader of a coordinated attack group consisting of Hoe, Aspro, and Cabrilla. Operating southwest of Lingayen Gulf, the submarines accounted for some 38,000 tons of valuable Japanese shipping in five night surface attacks. Hoe was credited with the sinking of passenger-cargo ship Kohoko Maru 8 October, and returned to Fremantle 22 October.

Her seventh patrol, 23 November 1944 to 3 January 1945, resulted in no sinkings. Part of this cruise was conducted in coordination with Flasher and Becuna.

== Eighth war patrol, February – March 1945 ==
Hoe's final war patrol began 8 February 1945, when she again headed for the South China Sea. By this time the vigorous American submarine offensive had taken its toll and little Japanese shipping could be found. The submarine did detect a tanker with an escort 25 February and in a well-conducted submerged attack sank the escort, Shōnan.

Two days before, while patrolling off Indochina, she and Flounder had been involved in one of the most unusual accidents of the war. While steaming at a depth of 60 feet (18 m) Hoe struck an object and broached, sustaining only light damage. Subsequent analysis proved that she had actually collided with Flounder, one of the few submerged collisions on record. Ending her last patrol at Pearl Harbor 6 March, Hoe returned to the United States for overhaul and repairs.

== Post-war service ==
She sailed again for the Western Pacific 5 July 1945 and was just entering Apra Harbor, Guam, when the war ended. A few days later she sailed for the East Coast via Pearl Harbor and the Panama Canal, arriving New York 29 September 1945.

Hoe decommissioned 7 August 1946 at New London, Conn., and joined the Atlantic Reserve Fleet. In September 1956 she was taken out of reserve to act as a Naval Reserve Training Ship in a noncommissioned status in the 3rd Naval District. She was subsequently sold 23 August 1960 to Laneett Inc., Boston, Massachusetts.

Hoe received seven battle stars for World War II service. Her first, third, fourth, sixth, and eighth patrols were designated successful.

== Bibliography ==
- Wright, C. C. (2005). "Question 17/03: Replacement of US Submarine Diesel Engines". Warship International. XLII (4): 431–434. ISSN 0043-0374.
