= USS Aspro (SS-309) =

Submarine of the United States

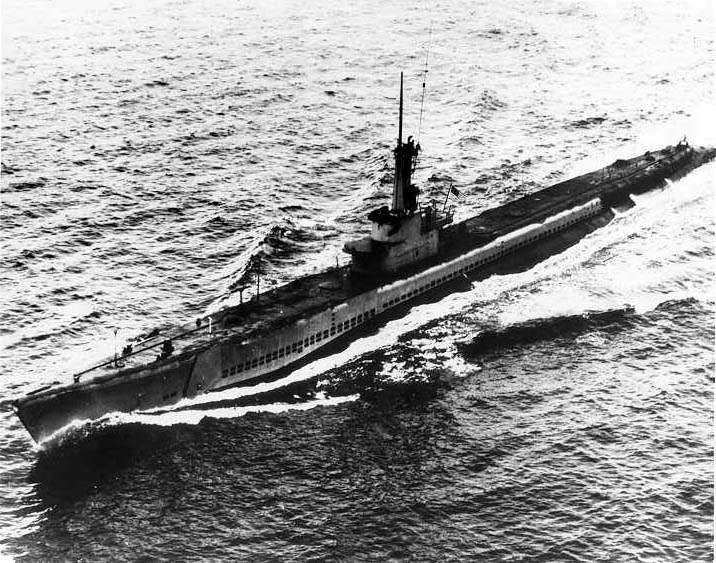
- Aspro (SS-309) underway

History

United States
- Builder: Portsmouth Naval Shipyard, Kittery, Maine
- Laid down: 27 December 1942
- Launched: 7 April 1943
- Commissioned: 31 July 1943
- Decommissioned: 30 January 1946
- Recommissioned: 23 September 1951
- Decommissioned: 30 April 1954
- Recommissioned: 4 May 1957
- Decommissioned: 7 September 1962
- Stricken: 7 September 1962
- Fate: Sunk as a target off San Diego, California on 16 November 1962

General characteristics
- Class & type: Balao class diesel-electric submarine
- Displacement: 1,526 long tons (1,550 t) surfaced, 2,391 long tons (2,429 t) submerged
- Length: 311 ft 6 in (94.95 m)
- Beam: 27 ft 3 in (8.31 m)
- Draft: 16 ft 10 in (5.13 m) maximum
- Propulsion: 4 × Fairbanks-Morse Model 38D8-1/8 9-cylinder opposed-piston diesel engines driving electrical generators; 2 × 126-cell Sargo batteries; 4 × high-speed Elliott electric motors with reduction gears; 2 × propellers; 5,400 shp (4.0 MW) surfaced; 2,740 shp (2.04 MW) submerged
- Speed: 20.25 kn (37.50 km/h) surfaced, 8.75 kn (16.21 km/h) submerged
- Range: 11,000 nmi (20,000 km) surfaced @ 10 kn (19 km/h)
- Endurance: 48 hours @ 2 kn (3.7 km/h) submerged, 75 days on patrol
- Test depth: 400 ft (120 m)
- Complement: 10 officers, 70–71 enlisted
- Armament: 10 × 21-inch (533 mm) torpedo tubes; 6 forward, 4 aft; 24 torpedoes; 1 × 5-inch (127 mm) / 25 caliber deck gun; Bofors 40 mm and Oerlikon 20 mm cannon

USS Aspro (SS/AGSS-309), a Balao-class submarine, was the first ship of the United States Navy to be named for the aspro, a fish found abundantly in the upper Rhône River. According to legend, the aspro comes to the surface only in bad weather, when other fishes take refuge near the bottom. This trait gave rise to its nickname, "Sorcerer."

== Construction and commissioning ==
Aspro was laid down on 27 December 1942 by the Portsmouth Navy Yard in Kittery, Maine; launched on 7 April 1943; sponsored by Mrs. William L. Freseman; and commissioned on 31 July 1943.

== World War II ==
Aspro held shakedown training in the waters off Portsmouth, New Hampshire; Newport, Rhode Island; and New London, Connecticut. After completing her tests and trial runs, she sailed on 17 September for Pearl Harbor. She arrived at Pearl Harbor on 18 October and immediately began preparations for her first war patrol which would take her to waters around Formosa and Sakishima Gunto.

=== First war patrol, November 1943 – January 1944 ===
She departed Hawaii on 24 November and made a brief fuel stop at Midway Atoll on 28 November before proceeding to her assigned area. On 15 December, she spotted a Japanese convoy consisting of one tanker, two freighters, and two escorts. The submarine fired torpedoes at the tanker and claimed a hit, but apparently failed to inflict serious damage.

Her next chance came on the night of 17–18 December, when she spotted a convoy of 15 Japanese ships. At 22:26, Aspro fired her stern tubes at a large tanker and an adjacent freighter. The submarine then made an end around run and attacked again. She claimed to have witnessed three vessels sinking, one severely crippled ship being taken under tow, and two other vessels having been damaged. Aspro escaped counterattack by the Japanese destroyer Shiokaze. With only one torpedo left, she returned to Midway on 1 January 1944, terminating her patrol after 39 days at sea. Postwar analysis failed to substantiate any of the sinkings, crediting her with damaging fleet tankers Sarawak Maru and Tenei Maru.

During the course of the patrol, Stevenson had noticed his eyesight was growing progressively weaker. Therefore, after arriving at Midway, he underwent an eye examination and was disqualified for sea duty. He then suggested that his brother, Lt. Comdr. William A. Stevenson, relieve him. This recommendation was approved, and the change took place on 15 January 1944.

=== Second war patrol, January – March 1944 ===
Following a refit Aspro departed Midway on 15 January and proceeded to Pearl Harbor to undergo brief training before heading back to Midway on 3 February en route to her second patrol. This assignment took her to an area north of Truk, as part of Operation Hailstone. On 15 February at 11:21, she spotted a large Japanese submarine, which was later identified as I-43. After a long surface pursuit, Aspro drew within range of I-43, and at 22:23 fired four torpedoes. Her crew saw and heard an explosion, followed shortly by another. They then saw her target's bow rise as the victim sank by her stern at 10°23′N 150°23′E. This was Aspro's first confirmed sinking.

On 17 February, she underwent a depth charge attack, but suffered no damage. Aspro torpedoed a freighter on 4 March, and the subsequent explosion shook the submarine violently. However, the Japanese vessel was merely damaged, not sunk. The rest of this patrol passed uneventfully, and Aspro retired to Pearl Harbor on 28 March after 54 days at sea.

=== Third war patrol, April – June 1944 ===
Aspro carried out her third patrol near the Palau Islands. After refitting she got underway on 22 April and headed west. Following a brief stop at Midway for supplies four days later, she continued on to waters around the Palau Islands. On 14 May, the submarine encountered a convoy of two freighters protected by three escorts. At 05:54, she fired a spread of torpedoes at one freighter and, one and one-half hours later, saw the damaged ship lying dead in the water and sinking by the stern. At the end of two hours of intermittent observation, this ship later disappeared from sight. The next day, Aspro attacked one of the escorts of the same convoy and heard one explosion. The submarine's crew watched from the bridge as the target sank. Aspro remained on patrol for another month before reaching Fremantle, Western Australia, on 16 June. There, she was officially credited with sinking one ship and assisting in destroying another for a total loss of 8,650 tons of Japanese shipping. {15 May 1944 the Sinking ship "Jokuja Maru" 6,440 tons was sunk at 10.10N 131.25E}

=== Fourth war patrol, July – August 1944 ===
The submarine spent two weeks undergoing a refit before beginning her fourth patrol on 9 July. After pausing at Darwin, Northern Territory on 16 July to top off her fuel tanks, she proceeded to the South China Sea. Shortly thereafter, on 19 July, Aspro found a convoy of four medium-sized ships in company with five escort vessels off the west coast of Luzon and fired her torpedoes at 05:45 and heard a series of explosions. As a result of this, she claimed to have sunk one ship and damaged a second. The next day, the submarine fired torpedoes at a member of a three-ship convoy, but all apparently missed.

On 28 July, Aspro sighted an anchored ship flying a Japanese flag and launched a spread of torpedoes. The submarine heard three explosions, and her target emitted heavy smoke amidships and began listing to starboard and settling by the bow. The vessel became a mass of flames, and her fires continued to rage as Aspro withdrew from the area. A week later, she encountered the moored ship again – hard aground, listing to starboard, and completely gutted by fire. Two large holes in the hull at the waterline were visible. {This was the transport "Peking Maru" of 2,288 tons at 17.33N 120.21E}

On 6 August, the submarine spotted two Japanese freighters and opened fire at 10:16. One of these ships was later seen to be listing 15 degrees to port, but still underway. The next day, Aspro attacked a 12-ship convoy. Her torpedoes hit a large freighter which sagged in the middle and started to settle. Following this action, Aspro continued her patrol uneventfully before returning to Fremantle on 18 August.

=== Fifth war patrol, September – October 1944 ===
On 10 September, Aspro sailed for her fifth patrol which took her back to the South China Sea. While still in transit to the patrol area, she found her first targets on 30 September off the northeast coast of Luzon where she met a convoy of seven or eight vessels protected by four escorts. She torpedoed and heavily damaged a freighter. Two days later, she attacked a tanker and heard breaking-up noises for 10–15 minutes. Through her periscope, she saw her victim listing to starboard with her bow high in the air. Soon Aspro lost sight of the ship and claimed to have sunk her. About an hour later, Aspro attacked another freighter in the same convoy. The ship was seen sinking in a vertical dive, stern first. {The 2 Oct 1944 credit was the cargo "Azuchisan Maru" of 6,888 tons at 18.25M 120.32E}

Following this action, Aspro rendezvoused with Hoe and Cabrilla to form a wolf pack. On 7 October, Hoe spotted a large convoy consisting of about a dozen ships. At 04:55, Aspro fired four torpedoes at a freighter and witnessed the ship's sinking. {This was the Passenger-cargo "Macassar Maru" of 4,026 tons at 17.54N 119.57E}. Shortly thereafter, she terminated her patrol at Saipan on 14 October and then proceeded to Pearl Harbor where she arrived on 25 October.

=== Sixth war patrol, November 1944 – February 1945 ===
Aspro departed Pearl Harbor on 21 November and headed for Saipan. On 28 November, her No. 1 main generator threw a banding wire off the rotor, necessitating a replacement of the armature. Such repairs required her return to Pearl Harbor. After a week's work there, Aspro got underway on 13 December for her sixth war patrol. She was assigned lifeguard duties west of Taiwan to support carrier strikes for the week of 3 January 1945. While on her station, she attacked the amphibious assault ship Shinshu Maru. Two torpedoes hit and sank this target.

Her only other torpedo attack during the patrol occurred on 6 January, when she fired on two small freighters but missed. Her most important accomplishment of the patrol – which ended at Pearl Harbor on 11 February 1945 – was her rescue of four downed American aviators. She was under the command of James H. Ashley Jr. (class of 1934, USNA) who received the Navy Cross for this mission.

=== Seventh war patrol, June – August 1945 ===
Following this patrol, Aspro left Hawaii bound for the California coast. She entered Hunter's Point Naval Shipyard on 20 February and spent the next three months undergoing overhaul. This work ended on 31 May, and she sailed for Pearl Harbor to resume her combat duties.

Her seventh and final patrol began on 25 June and covered waters south of the Japanese home islands. On 8 July, she was assigned lifeguard duties in support of planes that had taken off from Iwo Jima for strikes on military targets in Japan. Beginning 20 July, she shifted position to cover carrier-based strikes against southeastern Honshū. Five days later, the submarine attacked and claimed to have sunk a Japanese tug with her final torpedo spread of the war.

On 3 August, she carried out a daring rescue of a downed aviator. Aspro entered Sagami Wan and came within five to six miles of the Japanese mainland to retrieve the pilot. Despite repeated Japanese air attacks, she succeeded in saving the American. Henry "Hank" Freeman USN (1922–2014) jumped into the waters after shooting down one of the Japanese bombers attacking the "Aspro" realizing the submarine was in the process of submerging during Japanese bomber attacks. After 2 hours she surfaced and picked up the wounded pilot and seaman. For his "Conspicuous Gallantry" Freeman was awarded a Silver Star and a Purple Heart for wounds he received.

Her patrol ended on 13 August, when she moored at Midway to commence a refit. It was here that Aspro received word of the Japanese capitulation which ended the war. On 1 September Aspro departed Midway, bound for the California coast. She arrived at San Francisco on 11 September for preservation work prior to being placed out of commission on 30 January 1946 and entering the Pacific Reserve Fleet in the Mare Island berthing area.

== Post-War service ==
Aspro was recommissioned on 6 July 1951 and, for the next two years, operated out of San Diego, her new home port, and performed routine work along the west coast. On 9 November 1953, she was placed in a reserve status and was berthed with the Mare Island group of the Pacific Reserve Fleet. Aspro was decommissioned on 30 April 1954.

The submarine was placed back in commission on 4 May 1957. She completed shakedown and was accepted into the active fleet on 8 June. She resumed her services to various units stationed along the west coast. This routine was broken first by the 1959 movie Battle of the Coral Sea, starring Cliff Robertson, which was shot in part aboard Aspro, then by a deployment to the western Pacific in mid-1959.

Upon her return to San Diego on 22 January 1960, Aspro underwent overhaul. On 1 July 1960, Aspro was redesignated AGSS-309. She then resumed her services along the west coast. On 7 September 1962, Aspro was decommissioned, and her name was struck from the Navy list on 9 October 1962. She was later sunk as a target by Pomodon off San Diego, California on 16 November 1962.

== Awards ==
Aspro won seven battle stars for her World War II service.
