= German submarine U-547 =

German World War II submarine

History

Nazi Germany
- Name: U-547
- Ordered: 5 June 1941
- Builder: Deutsche Werft, Hamburg
- Yard number: 368
- Laid down: 30 August 1942
- Launched: 3 April 1943
- Commissioned: 16 June 1943
- Fate: Mine damage in France on 11 August 1944; possibly scuttled at Stettin on 31 December 1944

General characteristics
- Class & type: Type IXC/40 submarine
- Displacement: 1,144 t (1,126 long tons) surfaced; 1,257 t (1,237 long tons) submerged
- Length: 76.76 m (251 ft 10 in) o/a; 58.75 m (192 ft 9 in) pressure hull
- Beam: 6.86 m (22 ft 6 in) o/a; 4.44 m (14 ft 7 in) pressure hull
- Height: 9.60 m (31 ft 6 in)
- Draught: 4.67 m (15 ft 4 in)
- Installed power: 4,400 PS (3,200 kW; 4,300 bhp) (diesels); 1,000 PS (740 kW; 990 shp) (electric)
- Propulsion: 2 shafts; 2 × diesel engines; 2 × electric motors
- Speed: 18.3 knots (33.9 km/h; 21.1 mph) surfaced; 7.3 knots (13.5 km/h; 8.4 mph) submerged
- Range: 13,850 nmi (25,650 km; 15,940 mi) at 10 knots (19 km/h; 12 mph) surfaced; 63 nmi (117 km; 72 mi) at 4 knots (7.4 km/h; 4.6 mph) submerged
- Test depth: 230 m (750 ft)
- Complement: 4 officers, 44 enlisted
- Armament: 6 × torpedo tubes (4 bow, 2 stern); 22 × 53.3 cm (21 in) torpedoes; 1 × 10.5 cm (4.1 in) SK C/32 deck gun (180 rounds); 1 × 3.7 cm (1.5 in) SK C/30 AA gun; 1 × twin 2 cm FlaK 30 AA guns

Service record
- Part of: 4th U-boat Flotilla 16 June – 31 December 1943; 2nd U-boat Flotilla 1 January – 30 September 1944; 33rd U-boat Flotilla 1 October – 31 December 1944
- Identification codes: M 52 404
- Commanders: K.Kapt. / F.Kapt. Kurt Sturm 16 June 1943 – 18 April 1944; Oblt.z.S. Heinrich Niemeyer 18 April – 31 December 1944
- Operations: 3 patrols: 1st patrol: 25 December 1943 – 23 February 1944; 2nd patrol: 30 April – 11 August 1944; 3rd patrol: a. 23 August – 29 September 1944 b. 1 – 4 October 1944
- Victories: 2 merchant ships sunk (8,371 GRT); 1 auxiliary warship sunk (750 GRT)

German submarine U-547 was a Type IXC U-boat of Nazi Germany's Kriegsmarine during World War II.

She was laid down at the Deutsche Werft (yard) in Hamburg as yard number 368 on 30 August 1942, launched on 3 April 1943 and commissioned on 16 June with Korvettenkapitän Kurt Sturm in command.

U-547 began her service career with training as part of the 4th U-boat Flotilla from 16 June 1943. She was reassigned to the 2nd flotilla for operations on 1 January 1944, then the 33rd flotilla on 1 October.

She carried out three patrols and sank three ships; two of them totalled 8,371 gross register tons (GRT). She also sank an auxiliary warship of 750 GRT. She was a member of four wolfpacks.

She was damaged by a mine in France on 11 August 1944 and possibly scuttled at Stettin (now Szczecin, Poland) on 31 December 1944.

== Design ==
German Type IXC/40 submarines were slightly larger than the original Type IXCs. U-547 had a displacement of 1,144 tonnes (1,126 long tons) when at the surface and 1,257 tonnes (1,237 long tons) while submerged. The U-boat had a total length of 76.76 m (251 ft 10 in), a pressure hull length of 58.75 m (192 ft 9 in), a beam of 6.86 m (22 ft 6 in), a height of 9.60 m (31 ft 6 in), and a draught of 4.67 m (15 ft 4 in). The submarine was powered by two MAN M 9 V 40/46 supercharged four-stroke, nine-cylinder diesel engines producing a total of 4,400 metric horsepower (3,240 kW; 4,340 shp) for use while surfaced, two Siemens-Schuckert 2 GU 345/34 double-acting electric motors producing a total of 1,000 shaft horsepower (1,010 PS; 750 kW) for use while submerged. She had two shafts and two 1.92 m (6 ft) propellers. The boat was capable of operating at depths of up to 230 metres (750 ft).

The submarine had a maximum surface speed of 18.3 knots (33.9 km/h; 21.1 mph) and a maximum submerged speed of 7.3 knots (13.5 km/h; 8.4 mph). When submerged, the boat could operate for 63 nautical miles (117 km; 72 mi) at 4 knots (7.4 km/h; 4.6 mph); when surfaced, she could travel 13,850 nautical miles (25,650 km; 15,940 mi) at 10 knots (19 km/h; 12 mph). U-547 was fitted with six 53.3 cm (21 in) torpedo tubes (four fitted at the bow and two at the stern), 22 torpedoes, one 10.5 cm (4.13 in) SK C/32 naval gun, 180 rounds, and a 3.7 cm (1.5 in) SK C/30 as well as a 2 cm (0.79 in) C/30 anti-aircraft gun. The boat had a complement of forty-eight.

== Service history ==
=== First patrol ===
U-547's first patrol began with her departure from Kiel on 25 December 1943. She passed through the gap separating Iceland and the Faroe Islands before heading out into the Atlantic Ocean.

She entered Lorient, on the French Atlantic coast, on 23 February 1944.

=== Second patrol ===
For her second foray, the boat headed for the west African coast. There, she sank the French ship Saint Basile off Liberia on 14 June 1944.

On 2 July, she sank the Dutch Bodegraven 200 nautical miles (370 km; 230 mi) south of Monrovia. The survivors were questioned, the master was taken prisoner.

She returned to France on 11 August 1944, but this time to Bordeaux.

=== Third patrol and fate ===
U-547 was damaged by a mine on 11 August 1944 in the Gironde (where the mouths of the Garonne and Dordogne rivers merge), near Pauillac in western France; she then retraced part of the route of her first patrol, arriving at Marviken in Kristiansand on 29 September and moving on to Flensburg on 4 October. She was taken out of service and possibly scuttled in Stettin (now Szczecin, Poland) on 31 December 1944.

== Summary of raiding history ==
Date	Ship Name	Nationality	Tonnage (Note: Merchant ship tonnages are in gross register tons. Military vessels are listed by tons displacement.)	Fate
14 June 1944	HMS Birdlip	Royal Navy	750	Sunk
14 June 1944	Saint Basile	Free France	2,778	Sunk
2 July 1944	Bodegraven	Netherlands	5,593	Sunk

== Bibliography ==
- Busch, Rainer; Röll, Hans-Joachim (1999). German U-boat commanders of World War II: a biographical dictionary. Translated by Brooks, Geoffrey. London, Annapolis, Md: Greenhill Books, Naval Institute Press. ISBN 1-55750-186-6.
- Busch, Rainer; Röll, Hans-Joachim (1999). Deutsche U-Boot-Verluste von September 1939 bis Mai 1945 [German U-boat losses from September 1939 to May 1945]. Der U-Boot-Krieg (in German). Vol. IV. Hamburg, Berlin, Bonn: Mittler. ISBN 3-8132-0514-2.
- Gröner, Erich; Jung, Dieter; Maass, Martin (1991). U-boats and Mine Warfare Vessels. German Warships 1815–1945. Vol. 2. Translated by Thomas, Keith; Magowan, Rachel. London: Conway Maritime Press. ISBN 0-85177-593-4.
- Kemp, Paul (1997). U-Boats Destroyed - German Submarine Losses in the World Wars. Arms & Armour. ISBN 1-85409-515-3.
