= German submarine U-390 =

German world war II submarine

Coordinates: 49°52′N 0°48′W

History

Nazi Germany
- Name: U-390
- Ordered: 21 November 1940
- Builder: Howaldtswerke, Kiel
- Yard number: 21
- Laid down: 6 December 1941
- Launched: 23 January 1943
- Commissioned: 13 March 1943
- Fate: Sunk on 5 July 1944

General characteristics
- Class & type: Type VIIC submarine
- Displacement: 769 tonnes (757 long tons) surfaced; 871 t (857 long tons) submerged
- Length: 67.10 m (220 ft 2 in) o/a; 50.50 m (165 ft 8 in) pressure hull
- Beam: 6.20 m (20 ft 4 in) o/a; 4.70 m (15 ft 5 in) pressure hull
- Height: 9.60 m (31 ft 6 in)
- Draught: 4.74 m (15 ft 7 in)
- Installed power: 2,800–3,200 PS (2,100–2,400 kW; 2,800–3,200 bhp) (diesels); 750 PS (550 kW; 740 shp) (electric)
- Propulsion: 2 shafts; 2 × diesel engines; 2 × electric motors
- Speed: 17.7 knots (32.8 km/h; 20.4 mph) surfaced; 7.6 knots (14.1 km/h; 8.7 mph) submerged
- Range: 8,500 nmi (15,700 km; 9,800 mi) at 10 knots (19 km/h; 12 mph) surfaced; 80 nmi (150 km; 92 mi) at 4 knots (7.4 km/h; 4.6 mph) submerged
- Test depth: 230 m (750 ft); Crush depth: 250–295 m (820–968 ft)
- Complement: 4 officers, 40–56 enlisted
- Armament: 5 × 53.3 cm (21 in) torpedo tubes (four bow, one stern); 14 × torpedoes; 1 × 8.8 cm (3.46 in) deck gun (220 rounds); 2 × twin 2 cm (0.79 in) C/30 anti-aircraft guns

Service record
- Part of: 5th U-boat Flotilla; 13 March – 30 November 1943; 7th U-boat Flotilla; 1 December 1943 – 5 July 1944
- Commanders: Oblt.z.S. Heinz Geissler; 13 March 1943 – 5 July 1944
- Operations: 3 patrols: 1st patrol: a. 2 – 5 December 1943; b. 7 December 1943 – 13 February 1944; 2nd patrol: 21 – 24 June 1943; 3rd patrol: 27 June – 5 July 1944
- Victories: 1 auxiliary warship sunk (545 GRT)

German submarine U-390 was a Type VIIC U-boat of Nazi Germany's Kriegsmarine during World War II.

She carried out three patrols before being sunk by British warships 5 July 1944 in the English Channel.

She was a member of four wolfpacks.

She sank one auxiliary warship of 545 gross register tons (GRT).

== Design ==
German Type VIIC submarines were preceded by the shorter Type VIIB submarines. U-390 had a displacement of 769 tonnes (757 long tons) when at the surface and 871 tonnes (857 long tons) while submerged. She had a total length of 67.10 m (220 ft 2 in), a pressure hull length of 50.50 m (165 ft 8 in), a beam of 6.20 m (20 ft 4 in), a height of 9.60 m (31 ft 6 in), and a draught of 4.74 m (15 ft 7 in). The submarine was powered by two Germaniawerft F46 four-stroke, six-cylinder supercharged diesel engines producing a total of 2,800 to 3,200 metric horsepower (2,060 to 2,350 kW; 2,760 to 3,160 shp) for use while surfaced, two Garbe, Lahmeyer & Co. RP 137/c double-acting electric motors producing a total of 750 metric horsepower (550 kW; 740 shp) for use while submerged. She had two shafts and two 1.23 m (4 ft) propellers. The boat was capable of operating at depths of up to 230 metres (750 ft).

The submarine had a maximum surface speed of 17.7 knots (32.8 km/h; 20.4 mph) and a maximum submerged speed of 7.6 knots (14.1 km/h; 8.7 mph). When submerged, the boat could operate for 80 nautical miles (150 km; 92 mi) at 4 knots (7.4 km/h; 4.6 mph); when surfaced, she could travel 8,500 nautical miles (15,700 km; 9,800 mi) at 10 knots (19 km/h; 12 mph). U-390 was fitted with five 53.3 cm (21 in) torpedo tubes (four fitted at the bow and one at the stern), fourteen torpedoes, one 8.8 cm (3.46 in) SK C/35 naval gun, 220 rounds, and two twin 2 cm (0.79 in) C/30 anti-aircraft guns. The boat had a complement of between forty-four and sixty.

== Service history ==
The submarine was laid down on 6 December 1941 at the Howaldtswerke yard at Kiel as yard number 21, launched on 23 January 1943 and commissioned on 13 March under the command of Oberleutnant zur See Heinz Geissler.

After commissioning, U-390 joined the 5th U-boat Flotilla based at Kiel for training the ship's crew, while in September that year, the submarine took part in experimental trials in the Baltic Sea.

=== First patrol ===
In December 1943, the submarine transferred to the operational 7th U-boat Flotilla. On 2 December, the submarine left Kiel, arriving at Bergen, Norway, on 5 December, and leaving Bergen for the Atlantic on 7 December. From 22 December, U-390 joined the patrol group Rüugen, operating to the west of Ireland. The Rügen group comprised six smaller groups in order to prevent their operating area from being deduced, with U-390 forming part of sub-group Rügen 3. On 7 January, the small groups were ordered to separate, with the Rügen boats being deployed, singly, in a long line in the Western Approaches. On 19 January, U-390 fired four torpedoes at ships south west of Rockall, but this attack failed. On 26 January, U-390 joined another patrol line, Stürmer, north west of the North Channel, aiming to attack a convoy outbound from Britain, but on 29 January, all submarines in the North Atlantic, including U-390 were ordered to intercept a potential invasion force which a German aircraft had reported as heading for Bordeaux. Shortly afterwards, however, this diversion was cancelled when it was confirmed that the alleged invasion force was in fact a group of Spanish fishing trawlers. U-390 arrived at her new base of St. Nazaire in occupied France on 13 February 1944.

=== Second patrol ===
On 21 June 1944, U-390, recently fitted with a schnorkel, set out from Saint-Nazaire on a mission to carry ammunition to Cherbourg, cut off by the Allied advance after the Normandy landings. On 23 June, after the American advance on Cherbourg made the supply mission untenable, the mission was cancelled. U-390 arrived at Brest on 24 June, where torpedoes were loaded.

=== Third patrol and loss ===
On 27 June, U-390 left Brest for operations against invasion shipping. Early on 5 July 1944, the submarine encountered an England-bound convoy north-east of Barfleur, firing two torpedoes, which probably sank the British anti-submarine trawler HMS Ganilly and damaged the American transport Sea Porpoise. Soon afterwards, the frigate HMS Tavy, part of the convoy's escort, detected U-390 on sonar and attacked with depth charges, and then, together with the destroyer HMS Wanderer , carried out a series of depth charge and Hedgehog attacks, which destroyed the submarine. A single member of U-390's crew, the submarine's Chief Engineer, escaped using Escape breathing apparatus and was rescued by Tavy. Forty-eight men were killed in U-390.

=== Wolfpacks ===
U-390 took part in four wolfpacks, namely:

- Coronel 2 (15 – 17 December 1943)
- Rügen 3 (23 December 1943 – 7 January 1944)
- Rügen (7 – 26 January 1944)
- Stürmer (26 January – 3 February 1944)

== Summary of raiding history ==
Date	Ship Name	Nationality	Tonnage (GRT)	Fate
5 July 1944	HMT Ganilly	Royal Navy	545	Sunk

== Bibliography ==
- Blair, Clay (2000). Hitler's U-Boat War: The Hunted, 1942–1945. New York: Modern Library. ISBN 0-679-64033-9.
- Busch, Rainer; Röll, Hans-Joachim (1999). German U-boat commanders of World War II : a biographical dictionary. Translated by Brooks, Geoffrey. London, Annapolis, Md: Greenhill Books, Naval Institute Press. ISBN 1-55750-186-6.
- Busch, Rainer; Röll, Hans-Joachim (1999). Deutsche U-Boot-Verluste von September 1939 bis Mai 1945 [German U-boat losses from September 1939 to May 1945]. Der U-Boot-Krieg (in German). Vol. IV. Hamburg, Berlin, Bonn: Mittler. ISBN 3-8132-0514-2.
- Gröner, Erich; Jung, Dieter; Maass, Martin (1991). U-boats and Mine Warfare Vessels. German Warships 1815–1945. Vol. 2. Translated by Thomas, Keith; Magowan, Rachel. London: Conway Maritime Press. ISBN 0-85177-593-4.
- Kemp, Paul (1999). U-Boats Destroyed - German Submarine Losses in the World Wars. London: Arms & Armour. ISBN 1-85409-515-3.
- Wynn, Kenneth (2003) [1997]. U-Boat Operations of the Second World War: Volume 1: Career Histories, U1–U510. London: Caxton Editions. ISBN 1-84067-525-X.
