= HMS Tavy =

1943 River-class frigate of the Royal Navy

History

United Kingdom
- Name: Tavy
- Namesake: River Tavy
- Ordered: 26 February 1942
- Builder: Charles Hill & Sons & Belliss & Morcom
- Laid down: 17 October 1942
- Launched: 3 April 1943
- Commissioned: 3 July 1943
- Fate: Scrapped 28 September 1956

General characteristics
- Class & type: River-class frigate
- Displacement: 1,370 long tons (1,390 t); 1,830 long tons (1,860 t) (deep load)
- Length: 283 ft (86.26 m) p/p; 301.25 ft (91.82 m)o/a
- Beam: 36.5 ft (11.13 m)
- Draught: 9 ft (2.74 m); 13 ft (3.96 m) (deep load)
- Propulsion: 2 × Admiralty 3-drum boilers, 2 shafts, reciprocating vertical triple expansion, 5,500 ihp (4,100 kW)
- Speed: 20 knots (37.0 km/h)
- Range: 7,200 nautical miles (13,334 km) at 12 knots (22.2 km/h), with 440 long tons (450 t; 490 short tons) of oil
- Complement: 107
- Armament: 2 × QF 4-inch (102 mm) Mk.XIX guns, single mounts CP Mk.XXIII; up to 10 × QF 20 mm Oerlikon AA guns on twin mounts Mk.V and single mounts Mk.III; 1 × Hedgehog 24 spigot A/S projector; up to 150 depth charges

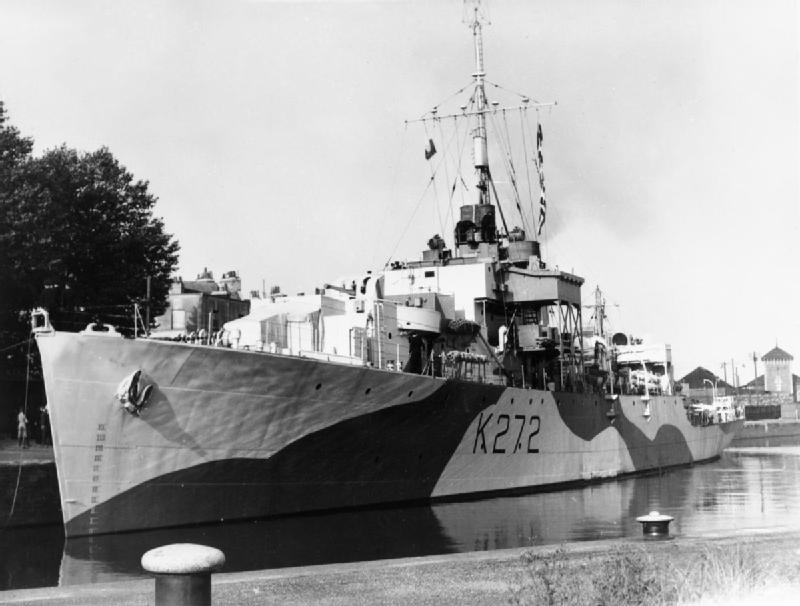
HMS Tavy docked in July 1943

HMS Tavy (K235) was a River-class frigate of the Royal Navy (RN). Tavy was built by Charles Hill & Sons & Belliss & Morcom in Bristol, England for the Royal Navy. She served during World War II.

Tavy was one of 151 River-class frigates launched between 1941 and 1944 for use as anti-submarine convoy escorts, named after rivers in the United Kingdom. The ships were designed by naval engineer William Reed, of Smith's Dock Company of South Bank-on-Tees, to have the endurance and anti-submarine capabilities of the Black Swan-class sloops, while being quick and cheap to build in civil dockyards using the machinery (e.g. reciprocating steam engines instead of turbines) and construction techniques pioneered in the building of the Flower-class corvettes. Its purpose was to improve on the convoy escort classes in service with the Royal Navy at the time, including the Flower class.

== Wartime service ==
On 5 July 1944 Tavy and HMS Wanderer attacked the German submarine U-390 in the English Channel. Tavy started the attack with hedgehog-launched depth charges and was followed by Wanderer. The two eventually disabled the U-boat, and further depth charging was conducted to ensure the destruction of the vessel. Some of Tavy' crew claimed U-390 fired two torpedoes in defence during the attack, both missing. Only one survivor escaped U-390, surfacing in diving equipment between the first and second hedgehog attacks. He was picked up by Wanderer.
