= USS Bonefish =

Two submarines of the United States Navy have been named USS Bonefish, after the bonefish.

- USS Bonefish (SS-223) became lost during World War II.
- USS Bonefish (SS-582) became damaged (beyond repair) by a fire at sea in 1988.
