= HMS Vox (P73) =

Royal Navy submarine

History

United Kingdom
- Name: Vox
- Namesake: Latin for "Voice"
- Builder: Vickers (Barrow)
- Yard number: V2
- Laid down: 19 December 1942
- Launched: 28 September 1943
- Commissioned: 20 December 1943
- Identification: P 73
- Fate: Scrapped at Cochin in 1946

General characteristics
- Class & type: V-class submarine
- Length: 195 ft (59 m)
- Beam: 16 ft (4.9 m)
- Draft: 16 ft (4.9 m)
- Speed: 13 knots (24 km/h; 15 mph) (surfaced); 9 knots (17 km/h; 10 mph) (submerged)
- Range: 4,050 mi (6,520 km) (surface); 170 mi (270 km) (submerged)
- Crew: 33
- Armament: 4 × 21-inch bow tubes (8 torpedoes carried); 1 × 3-inch gun; 3 × 0.303-inch machine guns

HMS Vox (P73) was a Royal Navy V-class submarine that served in the latter part of World War II, from 1943 to 1946, before it was scrapped at Cochin. An earlier HMS Vox had been transferred to France as Curie.

== History ==
Vox was laid down by Vickers–Armstrong on 19 December 1942, and was intended as a replacement for another submarine of the same name, which, upon completion, had been given into French service. The ship was launched on 28 September 1943, and was commissioned on 20 December.

The ship's first exercises occurred on 31 January 1944, when it participated in targeting and attack exercises in conjunction with HMS Vigorous, HMS Breda, and HMS Vivid in Holy Loch. Vox participated alongside Vivid in exercises against Vigorous late in the day. After the exercises, Vox departed Holy Loch alongside Vivid, and both ships made for Larne, escorted by HMS ML 225.

After a round trip from Larne to Holy Lock, Vox set out with HMS Sturdy for Gibraltar, with Sturdy on its way to the Far East and Vox to stay in the Mediterranean Sea. On 3 and 4 July 1944, while patrolling off the coast of Greece, Vox sank two sailing vessels off Monernvassia and one German sailing vessel off Santorini. On 10 July, Vox torpedoed and sank the German collier Anita between the Andros and Tinos Islands. On 1 August, Vox claimed to have sunk a sailing vessel, and on 3 August it fired two torpedoes at an auxiliary patrol vessel, though both torpedoes missed. On 4 August, Vox sank three German vessels at Heraklion: the guard ship GK 61 Pétrel and the sailing vessels Thetis and SA 83. Vox also sank enemy sailing vessels on 31 August, 24 September, and 25 September, when it sank the Greek sailing vessel Vol.

On 12 February 1945, Vox was put on to the slipway at Fremantle, and on 13 February was put back on the water. She was subsequently used in anti-submarine training until her scrapping in October 1946 at Cochin.
