= USS Cabrilla =

Submarine of the United States

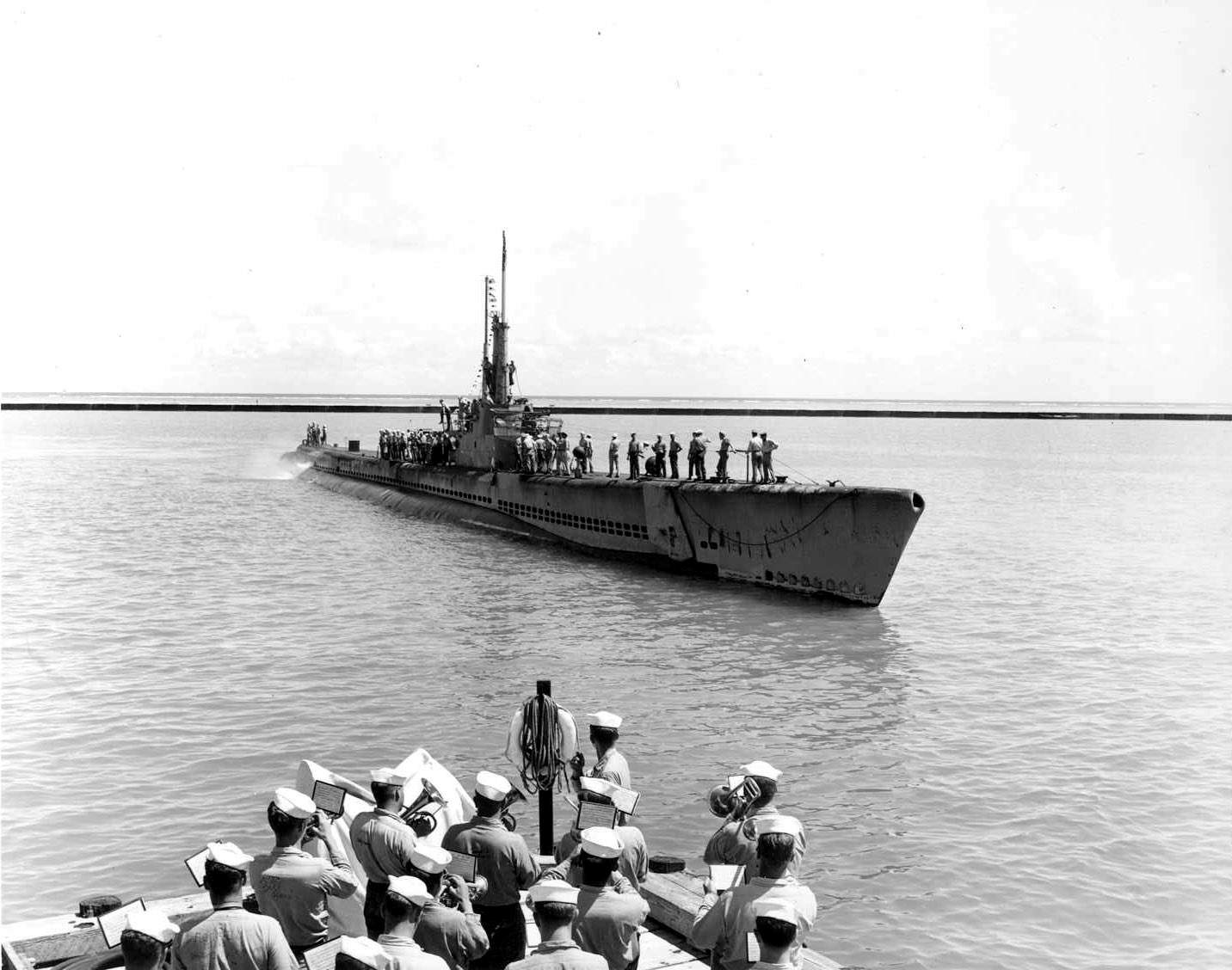
- USS Cabrilla returns from patrol

History

United States
- Builder: Portsmouth Naval Shipyard, Kittery, Maine
- Laid down: 18 August 1942
- Launched: 24 December 1942
- Commissioned: 24 May 1943
- Decommissioned: 7 August 1946
- Recommissioned: 1 December 1962
- Decommissioned: 30 June 1968
- Stricken: 30 June 1968
- Fate: Museum ship at Galveston, Texas, 19 October 1968, returned 21 January 1971, sold for scrap 18 April 1972

General characteristics
- Class & type: Balao class diesel-electric submarine
- Displacement: 1,526 tons (1,550 t) surfaced; 2,414 tons (2,453 t) submerged
- Length: 311 ft 9 in (95.02 m)
- Beam: 27 ft 3 in (8.31 m)
- Draft: 16 ft 10 in (5.13 m) maximum
- Propulsion: 4 × General Motors Model 16-248 V16 Diesel engines driving electric generators; 2 × 126-cell Sargo batteries; 4 × high-speed General Electric electric motors with reduction gears; two propellers; 5,400 shp (4.0 MW) surfaced; 2,740 shp (2.0 MW) submerged
- Speed: 20.25 knots (38 km/h) surfaced; 8.75 knots (16 km/h) submerged
- Range: 11,000 nautical miles (20,000 km) surfaced at 10 knots (19 km/h)
- Endurance: 48 hours at 2 knots (3.7 km/h) submerged; 75 days on patrol
- Test depth: 400 ft (120 m)
- Complement: 10 officers, 70–71 enlisted
- Armament: 10 × 21-inch (533 mm) torpedo tubes; 6 forward, 4 aft; 24 torpedoes; 1 × 4-inch (102 mm) / 50 caliber deck gun; Bofors 40 mm and Oerlikon 20 mm cannon

USS Cabrilla (SS/AGSS-288), a Balao-class submarine, was a ship of the United States Navy named for the cabrilla, an edible fish inhabiting the Mediterranean Sea and waters off the coast of California.

Cabrilla (SS-288) was launched 24 December 1942 by Portsmouth Navy Yard in Kittery, Maine; sponsored by Mrs. L. B. Combs; commissioned 24 May 1943 and reported to the Pacific Fleet.

Cabrilla arrived at Pearl Harbor on 30 August 1943, and on 12 September cleared on the first of eight war patrols. After a daring exploit in which four Filipino guerrillas were taken off Negros Island, Cabrilla completed her patrol at Fremantle, Australia, her base for the next five patrols.

During her second patrol, Cabrilla laid mines in the Gulf of Siam, and sank her first Japanese merchantman, then returned to Fremantle to prepare for her third patrol, a reconnaissance of Sunda Strait. Her fourth and fifth patrols, off Makassar, and in the Celebes and Sulu Seas, found her again striking with telling results against Japanese merchant shipping.

The most successful of her patrols was the sixth, in the South China Sea, and off Luzon from 13 September to 25 October 1944. During this period, she sank a total of 24,557 tons of shipping, including a 10,059-ton tanker. Cabrilla made her seventh war patrol in vicious weather in the Kurile Islands of northern Japan, and her last patrol found her on lifeguard duty for aviators downed at sea while carrying out attacks on Japan.

Homeward-bound after 2 arduous years, Cabrilla cleared Fremantle on 31 August 1945 for the States. Following overhaul at Philadelphia, she sailed for the Canal Zone for exercises (19 February – 17 March 1946), then underwent pre-inactivation overhaul at Philadelphia. Cabrilla was placed out of commission in reserve on 7 August 1946 at the Atlantic Reserve Fleet, New London, CT, and laid up in the Atlantic Reserve Fleet.

Cabrilla was recommissioned and redesignated Auxiliary Submarine AGSS-288, in 1962. She was decommissioned on 30 June 1968 and simultaneously struck from the Naval Register. Cabrilla was subsequently designated to be a museum ship and temporarily opened as such at Galveston Texas. However, delays in preparing a permanent berth and the poor material condition of the sub compelled the memorial organizers to exchange Cabrilla for the Gato-class submarine Cavalla. In January 1971 Cabrilla was returned to the Navy, which sold her for scrapping in April 1972.

Cabrilla received six battle stars for World War II service. Of her eight patrols, six were designated as "Successful War Patrols". She is credited with having sunk a total of 38,767 tons of shipping.
