= List of shipwrecks in October 1944 =

The list of shipwrecks in October 1944 includes ships sunk, foundered, grounded, or otherwise lost during October 1944.

== 1 October ==
List of shipwrecks: 1 October 1944
| Ship | State | Description |
|---|---|---|
| Ajiro | Imperial Japanese Navy | World War II: Convoy No. 3927: The Ajiro-class minelayer was torpedoed and sunk in the Pacific Ocean off the Bonin Islands by USS Snapper (United States Navy). |
| Asuka Maru | Japan | World War II: The cargo ship was torpedoed and sunk in the South China Sea (27°35′N 127°30′E) by USS Seawolf (United States Navy). |
| Kyokuho Maru | Imperial Japanese Navy | World War II: Convoy MIMA-11: The Type 1TL oiler was torpedoed and sunk in the South China Sea west of Luzon, Philippines (16°11′N 119°44′E) by USS Cabrilla (United States Navy). Forty-three troops, nine gunners, and 66 crewmen were killed. |
| Mostun | Kriegsmarine | World War II: The victualling ship struck a mine and sank in the Baltic Sea (56°51′30″N 10°37′30″E) with the loss of two lives. |
| HMMTB 347 | Royal Navy | World War II: The Vosper 72 foot-class motor torpedo boat (40/47 t, 1943) was shelled and sunk in the North Sea off IJmuiden, North Holland, Netherlands, by Kriegsmarine surface ships. |
| HMMTB 360 | Royal Navy | World War II: The Vosper 72 foot-class motor torpedo boat (40/47 t, 1943) was shelled and sunk in the North Sea off IJmuiden by Kriegsmarine surface ships. |
| MO-512 | Soviet Navy | World War II: The submarine chaser struck a mine and sank in the Baltic Sea off Reval, Estonia. |
| Nordstjärnan | Sweden | World War II: The fishing boat was sunk by a mine north in the Kattegat with the loss of all five crew. |
| Seian Maru | Japan | World War II: Convoy No. 3927: The cargo liner was torpedoed and sunk in the Pacific Ocean off the Bonin Islands (28°20′N 139°25′E) by USS Snapper (United States Navy). Four troops and twelve crewmen were killed. |
| T-1 | Soviet Navy | World War II: The tug struck a mine and sank in the Baltic Sea off Reval. |
| Takunan Maru | Imperial Japanese Navy | World War II: Convoy 3928: The auxiliary storeship was torpedoed and sunk off the coast of Japan 108 nautical miles (200 km) west of Torishima, Izu Islands (30°30′N 138°27′E) by USS Trepang (United States Navy). One crewman was killed. |
| USS YMS-385 | United States Navy | World War II: The YMS-1-class minesweeper was sunk by a mine in the Zowariau Channel off Ulithi, Caroline Islands (09°52′N 139°37′E). Ten crew were killed or died of their wounds. |
| Zuiyo Maru | Japan | World War II: Convoy MIMA-11: The oiler was torpedoed and sunk in the South China Sea west of Luzon (16°07′N 119°43′E) by USS Cabrilla (United States Navy). Two gunners, nineteen crewmen, and 45 survivors of Ural Maru (Imperial Japanese Army) who were passengers on board, were killed. |

== 2 October ==
List of shipwrecks: 2 October 1944
| Ship | State | Description |
|---|---|---|
| Azuchisan Maru | Japan | World War II: The cargo ship was torpedoed and sunk in the South China Sea by USS Aspro (United States Navy) with the loss of 19 lives. |
| GL 2 | Kriegsmarine | World War II: The Crabe-class patrol tug was sunk by Allied aircraft at La Spezia, Italy. |
| Higane Maru | Japan | World War II: Convoy MI-18: The Type 1K Standard Merchant ore carrier (a.k.a. Hikane Maru) was torpedoed and sunk in the South China Sea north west of Borneo, south west of Kudat, off Gaya Bay (06°30′N 116°15′E) by USS Hammerhead (United States Navy). Six troops and nine crewmen were killed. |
| Hiyori Maru | Japan | World War II: Convoy MI-18: The Type 1K ore carrier (a.k.a. Nichiwa Maru) was torpedoed and sunk in the South China Sea north west of Borneo, south west of Kudat off Gaya Bay (06°28′N 116°14′E) by USS Hammerhead (United States Navy). Seven troops and 27 crewmen were killed. |
| Kokusei Maru | Japan | World War II: Convoy MI-18: The Type 1K ore carrier was torpedoed and sunk in the South China Sea north west of Borneo, south west of Kudat off Gaya Bay (06°30′N 116°18′E) by USS Hammerhead (United States Navy). Thirty-two troops and 47 crewmen were killed. |
| M 7601 | Kriegsmarine | The minesweeper, a converted Pluvier-class patrol tug, was sunk by an internal explosion at La Spezia. |
| 11V3 Salamis | Kriegsmarine | The guard ship was lost on this date. |
| Tsar Ferdinand | Kriegsmarine | World War II: The hospital ship was torpedoed and sunk in the Aegean Sea 19 nautical miles (35 km) north-west of Skiathos, Greece, by Curie (Free French Naval Forces). |
| Tuyama Maru | Imperial Japanese Army | World War II: Convoy TAMA-28: The Toyooka Maru-class auxiliary transport was torpedoed and sunk in the Luzon Strait (20°50′N 121°31′E) by USS Pomfret (United States Navy). A total of 1,211 troops and 73 crewmen were killed. |
| Wachtel | Germany | World War II: The 229.7-foot (70.0 m), 992-ton cargo vessel was bombed and sunk off Poorterhaven, New Waterway, in Rotterdam. |

== 3 October ==
List of shipwrecks: 3 October 1944
| Ship | State | Description |
|---|---|---|
| Bertha | Germany | World War II: The cargo ship was torpedoed and sunk in the Aegean Sea south of Cassandreia, Greece by HMS Unswerving (Royal Navy). |
| GW 03 | Kriegsmarine | World War II: The coastal protection vessel was torpedoed and sunk in the Aegean Sea off Skiathos, Greece by Curie (Free French Naval Forces). |
| I-177 | Imperial Japanese Navy | World War II: The Kaidai-class submarine was shelled and sunk in the Pacific Ocean by USS Samuel S. Miles (United States Navy) with the loss of all 101 crew. |
| USS LCT-1052 | United States Navy | The LCT-1-class landing craft tank sank in a tropical storm at Ulithi, Caroline Islands. Her commanding officer was lost while the other 13 crew were rescued. LCT-1052 was salvaged by USS Hector (United States Navy). |
| Norma | United States | The 19-gross register ton, 43.6-foot (13.3 m) fishing vessel sank at the mouth of the Duncan Canal in the Alexander Archipelago in Southeast Alaska. |
| USS Seawolf | United States Navy | World War II: The Sargo-class submarine was mistakenly depth charged and sunk in the Molucca Sea off Morotai, Netherlands East Indies by USS Richard M. Rowell (United States Navy) in a friendly fire accident with the loss of all 100 people on board. |
| USS Shelton | United States Navy | World War II: The John C. Butler-class destroyer escort was torpedoed and damaged in the Molucca Sea off Morotai by Ro-41 (Imperial Japanese Navy) with the loss of thirteen of her 215 crew. She was taken under tow by USS Richard M. Rowell (United States Navy) but later capsized and sank. |
| Vs 906 Schwalbe | Kriegsmarine | World War II: The Vorpostenboot was sunk by a mine northwest of Anholt. |
| Yard No. 922 | Germany | World War II: The cargo ship was bombed and sunk in the North Sea off Den Helder, North Holland, Netherlands by Allied aircraft. |

== 4 October ==
List of shipwrecks: 4 October 1944
| Ship | State | Description |
|---|---|---|
| A 24 Schwaben | Germany | World War II: The transport ship was damaged in an Allied air raid on Bergen, Norway. |
| CHa-92 | Imperial Japanese Navy | The CHa-1-class submarine chaser ran aground off northern Luzon, Philippines, and was abandoned. |
| HMCS Chebogue | Royal Canadian Navy | World War II: Convoy ONS 33: The River-class frigate (1,445/2,110 t, 1944) was torpedoed and damaged in the Atlantic Ocean (49°20′N 24°20′W) by U-1227 (Kriegsmarine) with the loss of seven of her 107 crew. She was towed to Port Talbot, Glamorgan, United Kingdom by HMCS Chambly (Royal Canadian Navy). On 11 October she was driven aground at Port Talbot. Her 42 crew were rescued by the Mumbles Lifeboat. HMCS Chebogue was consequently declared a total loss. She was scrapped in February 1948. |
| Elisabeth Bornhofen | Germany | World War II: The cargo ship was bombed and sunk in the North Sea off Bergen, Norway by British aircraft. There were five survivors. |
| Elise Schulte | Germany | World War II: The unfinished cargo ship was scuttled at Amsterdam, North Holland, Netherlands. She was raised post-war and completed as Stad Leiden for Dutch owners. |
| Frankenfels | Germany | World War II: The unfinished cargo ship was scuttled at Amsterdam. She was raised post-war and completed as Albiero for Dutch owners. |
| Generale Carlo Montanari | Kriegsmarine | World War II: The Generali-class destroyer, previously scuttled by her crew and then raised by the Germans but not repaired, was bombed and sunk at La Spezia by Allied aircraft. |
| Gutenfels | Germany | World War II: The unfinished cargo ship was scuttled at Amsterdam. She was raised post-war and completed as Heelsum for Dutch owners. |
| Herta Johanne | Germany | World War II: The lighter struck a mine and sank in Fehmarnsund. |
| Kigen Maru | Japan | World War II: The auxiliary sailing vessel was bombed and sunk by a US Navy Consolidated PBY Catalina in the area of Jolo, Philippines. |
| Kiku Maru | Japan | World War II: The auxiliary sailing vessel was bombed and sunk by a US Navy Consolidated PBY Catalina in the area of Jolo, Philippines. |
| USS LCT-579 | United States Navy | World War II: The LCT-1-class landing craft tank was sunk by a mine off Angaur. Five crew were killed or missing and another died of his wounds. |
| Maininki | Finland | World War II: The cargo ship was bombed and sunk at Röytä, Finland by German dive bomber aircraft. One crew was killed and two wounded. |
| Radøy | Norway | World War II: The coaster (182 GRT, 1909) was bombed and sunk at Bergen, Norway by Royal Air Force aircraft. Wreck scrapped in summer 1945. |
| SF 191 | Kriegsmarine | The Siebel ferry was lost on this date. |
| Sten | Norway | World War II: The cargo ship (1,464 GRT, 1910) was bombed and sunk at Bergen, Norway, by Royal Air Force aircraft. The wreck was delivered for scrapping at Stavanger on 4 April 1946. |
| Taibin Maru | Japan | World War II: The cargo ship was torpedoed and sunk in the South China Sea by USS Flasher (United States Navy). |
| Tateishi Maru | Imperial Japanese Army | World War II: The Eastern Guide-class auxiliary transport, run aground when attacked and severely damaged by a US Navy Consolidated PBY Catalina aircraft at Jolo, Philippines, (06°02′N 121°29′E) on 27 September, is blown up when bombed by a US Navy Consolidated PBY Catalina, detonating dynamite in her cargo. Her commanding officer and all 24 hands were killed. |
| Ulv | Norway | World War II: Convoy Al-635-Dr: The coaster (938 GRT, 1921) was in collision with Altengamme (Germany) at Ålesund, Norway and sank. There was no casualty. She was raised post-war and repaired. Re-entered service in December 1949 as Gerold. |
| U-92 | Kriegsmarine | World War II: The Type VIIC submarine was bombed and damaged at Bergen by Royal Air Force aircraft. She was consequently withdrawn from service and later scrapped. |
| U-228 | Kriegsmarine | World War II: The Type VIIC submarine was bombed and sunk at Bergen by Royal Air Force aircraft. |
| U-437 | Kriegsmarine | World War II: The Type VIIC submarine was bombed and damaged at Bergen by Royal Air Force aircraft. She was struck from the Kriegsmarine list the next day and scrapped in 1946. |
| U-993 | Kriegsmarine | World War II: The Type VIIC submarine was destroyed in a Royal Air Force air raid on Bergen with the loss of two crew. |

== 5 October ==
List of shipwrecks: 5 October 1944
| Ship | State | Description |
|---|---|---|
| HMS BYMS 2255 | Royal Navy | World War II: The YMS-1-class minesweeper (215/320 t, 1943) was sunk by mine in the English Channel off Boulogne, Pas-de-Calais, France. There was no casualty. |
| HMS HDML 1227 | Royal Navy | World War II: The Harbour Defence Motor Launch (44/52 t, 1942) was shelled and sunk off Piraeus, Greece by TA38 and TA39 (both Kriegsmarine). The whole crew survived and was captured by the Germans. |
| Rokko Maru | Imperial Japanese Army | World War II: The Rokko Maru-class auxiliary transport (3,028 GRT, 1923) was bombed and sunk north west of Takao, Formosa by US aircraft. 90 killed. |
| Sperrbrecher 105 Prins Willem V | Nazi Germany | World War II: The uncompleted Sperrbrecher was scuttled by the Germans as a blockship near Maassluis, South Holland, Netherlands. The wreck was raised on 11 December 1947. She was repaired and entered Dutch service on 7 January 1949 as Prins Willem V. |
| SM 3 | Merivoimat | World War II: The SM-class minesweeper struck a mine and sank in the Baltic Sea east of Suursaari, Finland with the loss of five crew. |
| Sparviero | Germany | Sparviero World War II: The uncompleted aircraft carrier was scuttled at Genoa, Italy. She was refloated in December 1946 and scrapped in 1947. |
| Tatsushiro Maru | Japan | World War II: The cargo ship was torpedoed and sunk off Manila, Philippines by USS Cod (United States Navy). Two crewmen and an unknown number of the 500 troops she was carrying were killed. |
| Unknown schooner | Greece | World War II: A Greek schooner, possibly a Partizan supply vessel, was sunk in the Pagasetic Gulf by UJ-2110 (Kriegsmarine). |

== 6 October ==
List of shipwrecks: 6 October 1944
| Ship | State | Description |
|---|---|---|
| Aaro | Denmark | The cargo ship (1,426 GRT, 1925) dragged her anchor and collided with Yewdale (United Kingdom) in the English Channel off the French coast. She was declared a total loss. |
| Akane Maru | Japan | World War II: Convoy HI-77:The tanker was torpedoed and sunk in the Luzon Strait by USS Whale (United States Navy). A total of 747 troops and 63 crewmen were killed. Survivors were rescued by CD-21 (Imperial Japanese Navy). |
| USS Asphalt | United States Navy | Typhoon Louise: The Trefoil-class concrete barge was wrecked at Saipan, Northern Mariana Islands (15°13′N 145°22′E) in a storm. |
| CD-21 | Imperial Japanese Navy | World War II: Convoy HI-77:The Type C escort ship was torpedoed and sunk in the Luzon Strait off Luzon (19°45′N 118°22′E) by USS Seahorse (United States Navy). Lost with all 170 hands and all of the survivors from Akane Maru (Japan). |
| Cha-2 | Imperial Japanese Navy | World War II: The CHa-1-class submarine chaser was sunk west of Penang, Malaya by HMS Tally-Ho (Royal Navy). |
| CHANT 4 | United Kingdom | The CHANT collided with a fishing trawler in the Thames Estuary and was damaged. She was repaired and returned to service. |
| F 1036 | Kriegsmarine | World War II: The Type DM minelayer Marinefahrprahm exploded on the Danube near Stari Banovici when Soviet artillery hit the mines she was carrying. There were no survivors. |
| Hokurei Maru | Japan | World War II: Combined Convoys MATA-28 and MIMA-11: The tanker was torpedoed by USS Cabrilla (United States Navy) and beached off Vigan, Luzon. Five passengers and four crewmen were killed. |
| Kinugasa Maru | Japan | World War II: The transport ship was torpedoed and sunk in the South China Sea by USS Whale (United States Navy). |
| HMS LCP(L) 7 | Royal Navy | The landing craft personnel (large) (5.9/8.2 t, 1941) was lost on this date. |
| HMS LCP(L) 18 | Royal Navy | The landing craft personnel (large) (5.9/8.2 t, 1941) was lost on this date. |
| M 4246 Frisia VIII | Kriegsmarine | The auxiliary minesweeper was lost on this date. |
| Nordstern | Germany | World War II: The training ship was torpedoed and sunk in the Baltic Sea off Memel by Shch-407 (Soviet Navy). There were 531 dead, most of them refugees, and 94 survivors. |
| PiLB 39 | Kriegsmarine | World War II: The PiLB 39 Type personnel landing craft was sunk at Saaremaa by Soviet bomber aircraft. |
| SF 120 | Kriegsmarine | World War II: The Siebel ferry was sunk by Allied aircraft in Mikra Bay, Greece, with the loss of five lives. |
| Triton | Germany | World War II: The cargo ship was bombed and sunk at Stralsund, Germany, by Allied aircraft. |
| U-168 | Kriegsmarine | World War II: The Type IXC/40 submarine was torpedoed and sunk in the Java Sea (6°20′S 111°28′E) by HNLMS Zwaardvisch (Royal Netherlands Navy) with the loss of 23 of her 50 crew. |
| Yamamizu Maru No. 2 | Japan | World War II: combined Convoys MATA-28 and MIMA-11: The Standard Type 1TM tanker was torpedoed and sunk in the South China Sea off Vigan by USS Cabrilla (United States Navy). Fifty-six of her 58 crew and passengers were killed. |

== 7 October ==
List of shipwrecks: 7 October 1944
| Ship | State | Description |
|---|---|---|
| AF 73 | Kriegsmarine | World War II: The Artilleriefährprahm was sunk in the North Sea off Terschelling, Friesland, Netherlands by Allied aircraft. Later raised, repaired and returned to service. |
| F 911 | Kriegsmarine | The Type D Marinefahrprahm was sunk incomplete, probably at Gutehoffnungshutte, Wien, on this date. |
| F 1030 | Kriegsmarine | The Type DM minelayer Marinefahrprahm was sunk incomplete, probably at Gutehoffnungshutte, Wien, on this date. |
| F 1034 | Kriegsmarine | The Type DM minelayer Marinefahrprahm was sunk on this date. |
| FR 11 | Kriegsmarine | World War II: The FR 7-class river minesweeper aground on km 1216 of the Danube was destroyed by shells from Soviet tanks. |
| GK 62 | Kriegsmarine | World War II: The guard ship was sunk in the Aegean Sea south west of Cassandreia, Greece by HMS Termagant and HMS Tuscan (both Royal Navy). |
| HMIS HDML 1119 | Royal Indian Navy | World War II: The Harbour Defence Motor Launch (46/54 t, 1944) was sunk in error while anchored in the Raaf River off Maungdaw, Burma by two Supermarine Spitfire aircraft. Five crew were killed, and four more on HMIS HDML 1118 which was damaged in the same attack. |
| Kinugasa Maru | Imperial Japanese Navy | World War II: Convoy HI-77: The Kinugasa Maru-class auxiliary transport was torpedoed and sunk off Luzon, Philippines (14°30′N 115°45′E) by USS Baya and USS Hawkbill (both United States Navy). Ten passengers and 33 crewmen were killed. |
| Macassar Maru | Imperial Japanese Army | World War II: Convoy TAMA 28: The Samarang Maru-class auxiliary transport was torpedoed and sunk in the South China Sea north west of Vigan (17°46′N 119°40′E) by USS Aspro and USS Hoe (both United States Navy). Four naval shock troops, a gunner and three crew were killed. |
| Petar Zrinjski | Kriegsmarine | The auxiliary river minesweeper was sunk on this date. |
| Shinyo Maru No. 8 | Imperial Japanese Navy | World War II: The Toyosaka Maru-class auxiliary transport ship was torpedoed and sunk in the South China Sea about 43 nautical miles (80 km; 49 mi) west north west of Vigan, Luzon (17°50′N 119°37′E) by USS Cabrilla (United States Navy. The whole 44 crew were lost. |
| TA37 | Kriegsmarine | World War II: The Ariete-class torpedo boat was sunk in the Aegean Sea south west of Cassandreia by HMS Termagant and HMS Tuscan (both Royal Navy). |
| UJ-2101 Birgitta | Kriegsmarine | World War II: The submarine chaser was sunk in the Aegean Sea south west of Cassandreia by HMS Termagant and HMS Tuscan (both Royal Navy). |

== 8 October ==
List of shipwrecks: 8 October 1944
| Ship | State | Description |
|---|---|---|
| Achilles | Germany | World War II: The cargo ship was torpedoed and sunk in the Aegean Sea north west of Chios, Greece by HMS Vivid (Royal Navy). |
| Bagger 3 | Germany | World War II: The dredger was torpedoed and sunk in the Baltic Sea off Ventspils by Shch-407 (Soviet Navy). |
| HMS BYMS 2030 | Royal Navy | World War II: The YMS-1-class minesweeper was sunk by a mine in Seine Bay (49°27′N 00°02′W), west of Le Havre, Seine-Inférieure, France. |
| Freikoll | Norway | World War II: The coaster (236 GRT, 1941) was torpedoed and damaged in the North Sea north of Florø, Norway by HNoMS MTB-711, HNoMS MTB-712 and HNoMS MTB-722 (all Royal Norwegian Navy). She came ashore south of Søreboneset. All nine crew were rescued by MTB-722. |
| Horst | Germany | World War II: The tug was torpedoed and sunk in the Aegean Sea north west of Chios by HMS Vivid (Royal Navy). |
| Kohoku Maru | Imperial Japanese Army | World War II: Combined Convoys MATA-28 and MIMA-11: The Konan Maru-class auxiliary transport was torpedoed and sunk south west of Lingayen Gulf (18°31′N 116°00′E) by USS Hoe (United States Navy). A total of 361 civilian passengers including 20 surviving crewmen of Shirahan Maru (Japan}, ten guards, five watchmen and 41 crewmen including her commanding officer were killed. |
| HMCS Mulgrave | Royal Canadian Navy | World War II: The Bangor-class minesweeper struck a mine in the English Channel off the coast of Normandy, France, and was beached. She was declared a constructive total loss. |
| Paul | Germany | World War II: The tug was torpedoed and sunk in the Aegean Sea north west of Chios by HMS Vivid (Royal Navy). |
| RO 24 Zonnewijk | Luftwaffe | World War II: The transport ship was torpedoed and sunk in the Baltic Sea off Ventspils, Latvia (57°13′05″N 21°13′03″E) by Shch-407 (Soviet Navy). Of the 541 people on board, only 10 went down with her. |

== 9 October ==
List of shipwrecks: 9 October 1944
| Ship | State | Description |
|---|---|---|
| Angelina | Kriegsmarine | World War II: The auxiliary armed boat was sunk by gunfire by the gunboat NB-13 Partizan and patrol boat PC-2 Macola (both Yugoslav Partisans). Three crew were killed (two Germans and one Italian sailor) and nine crew were taken as prisoners of war (four Germans, including a colonel, and five Italian sailors). |
| DW 36 | Kriegsmarine | The KFK-2-class naval drifter was sunk on this date. |
| DW 37 | Kriegsmarine | The KFK-2-class naval drifter was sunk on this date. |
| Elbing I | Germany | World War II: The transport was bombed and sunk off Mõntu, Saaremaa, Estonia by Soviet aircraft. |
| Iller | Germany | World War II: The transport was bombed and sunk at Mõntu, Saaremaa, Estonia by Soviet Ilyushin Il-2 aircraft. |
| Inge Christophersen | Germany | World War II: The transport was bombed and sunk at Mõntu, Saaremaa, Estonia by Soviet Ilyushin Il-2 aircraft. |
| USS LCT-459 | United States Navy | The LCT-1-class landing craft tank was lost by grounding off the west coast of France. |
| Ludolf Oldendorff | Germany | World War II: The cargo ship was bombed and sunk in the North Sea off Sirevåg, Norway by Bristol Beaufighter aircraft of the Royal Air Force. |
| M 3230 Freddy | Kriegsmarine | World War II: The Jacqueline-class trawler/minesweeper was mined and sunk off Den Hoofden. |
| Marie Seidler | Germany | World War II: The transport was bombed and sunk at Saaremaa by Soviet Ilyushin Il-2 aircraft. |
| Maros | Kriegsmarine | The auxiliary river minesweeper was sunk on this date. |
| Rouergue | Kriegsmarine | World War II: The tanker was scuttled as a blockship at Salamis, Greece. |
| Sarp | Norway | The coaster (1,116 GRT, 1916) sank off Egersund, Norway. Later raised, repaired and returned to service. |
| Shinki Maru | Japan | World War II: The cargo ship was torpedoed and sunk in the Pacific Ocean south east of Kyushu by USS Croaker (United States Navy). |
| Tatibana Maru | Japan | World War II: Convoy MATA-28: The tanker was torpedoed and sunk in the South China Sea south of Formosa (16°33′N 116°38′E) by USS Sawfish (United States Navy). 20 passengers killed. Survivors rescued by CD-8 (Imperial Japanese Navy). |
| Tokuwa Maru | Japan | World War II: Convoy MATA-28: The tanker was torpedoed and sunk in the South China Sea south of Formosa by USS Baya, USS Becuna and USS Hawkbill (all United States Navy). Ten crewmen were killed. |
| UJ-1711 Otto N. Andersen | Kriegsmarine | World War II: The submarine chaser was bombed and sunk in the North Sea off the coast of Norway (58°29′N 5°44′E) by Bristol Beaufighter aircraft of the Royal Air Force. One crew member was killed. |
| V 1303 Freiburg | Kriegsmarine | World War II: The Vorpostenboot was sunk in the North Sea off Hook of Holland, South Holland, Netherlands by vessels of the 4th MTB Flotilla, Royal Navy. 19 crew were lost. |
| Vesta | Germany | World War II: The cargo ship was sunk as a blockship at Corinth, Greece. |

== 10 October ==
List of shipwrecks: 10 October 1944
| Ship | State | Description |
|---|---|---|
| Amgum | Soviet Navy | World War II: The gunboat struck a mine and sank in the Baltic Sea off Reval, Estonia. |
| CHa-87 | Imperial Japanese Navy | World War II: The CHa-1-class submarine chaser was bombed and sunk off Ryuku by American aircraft. |
| DW 36 | Kriegsmarine | The KFK 2-class naval drifter was lost. |
| DW 37 | Kriegsmarine | The KFK 2-class naval drifter was lost. |
| DW 39 | Kriegsmarine | The KFK 2-class naval drifter was lost. |
| Ejiri Maru | Imperial Japanese Army | World War II: Convoy TAMA-29: The Type 2A Wartime Standard cargo ship was torpedoed and damaged in the South China Sea near the Cape Rena Sea (16°10′N 119°45′E) by USS Lapon (United States Navy). Abandoned, she ran aground on a reef and exploded 3½ hours later. a total of 191 troops and eight crewmen were killed. |
| HA-61 | Imperial Japanese Navy | World War II: The Type C-class midget submarine was bombed and sunk at Unten, Okinawa by Grumman F6F Hellcat aircraft from USS Bunker Hill (United States Navy). |
| HA-62 | Imperial Japanese Navy | World War II: The Type C-class midget submarine was bombed and sunk at Unten, Okinawa by Grumman F6F Hellcat aircraft from USS Bunker Hill (United States Navy). |
| HA-63 | Imperial Japanese Navy | World War II: The Type C-class midget submarine was bombed and sunk at Unten, Okinawa by Grumman F6F Hellcat aircraft from USS Bunker Hill (United States Navy). |
| HA-65 | Imperial Japanese Navy | World War II: The Type C-class midget submarine was bombed and sunk at Unten, Okinawa by Grumman F6F Hellcat aircraft from USS Bunker Hill (United States Navy). |
| HA-66 | Imperial Japanese Navy | World War II: The Type C-class midget submarine was bombed and sunk at Unten, Okinawa by Grumman F6F Hellcat aircraft from USS Bunker Hill (United States Navy). |
| HA-68 | Imperial Japanese Navy | World War II: The Type C-class midget submarine was bombed and sunk at Unten, Okinawa by Grumman F6F Hellcat aircraft from USS Bunker Hill (United States Navy). |
| Jingei | Imperial Japanese Navy | World War II: The Jingei-class submarine tender was bombed and sunk off the coast of Okinawa 12 nautical miles (22 km) west south west of Ie Shima and 28 nautical miles (52 km) north north west of Naha (26°39′N 127°52′E) by United States Navy aircraft. She sank in shallow water with her superstructure above water. One hundred crewmen were killed. Raised in 1952, towed to Japan and scrapped. |
| Kaii | Imperial Japanese Navy | World War II: The Momo-class destroyer was sunk by United States Navy aircraft off Okinawa. |
| Koei Maru | Imperial Japanese Navy | World War II: The guard boat was sunk in the Strait of Malacca by HNLMS Zwaardvisch (Royal Netherlands Navy). |
| Lok-Fahre | Kriegsmarine | The LCT-1-class landing craft tank was sunk on this date. |
| Loots | Soviet Union | World War II: The tug was sunk at Tallinn by mines. Her master and three crewmen were killed. |
| LS 8 | Kriegsmarine | The LS 2 Type light schnellboot was lost. |
| LS 9 | Kriegsmarine | The LS 2 Type light schnellboot was lost. |
| HMS MGB 663 | Royal Navy | World War II: The Fairmile D motor gunboat (90/107 t, 1943) was sunk by a mine in the Adriatic Sea off Rimini, Italy. |
| No. 493 | Imperial Japanese Navy | The T-35-class motor torpedo boat was lost. |
| No. 496 | Imperial Japanese Navy | The T-35-class motor torpedo boat was lost. |
| No. 498 | Imperial Japanese Navy | The T-35-class motor torpedo boat was lost. |
| No. 805 | Imperial Japanese Navy | The T-35-class motor torpedo boat was lost. |
| No. 806 | Imperial Japanese Navy | The T-35-class motor torpedo boat was lost. |
| No. 810 | Imperial Japanese Navy | The T-35-class motor torpedo boat was lost. |
| No. 812 | Imperial Japanese Navy | The T-35-class motor torpedo boat was lost. |
| No. 813 | Imperial Japanese Navy | The T-35-class motor torpedo boat was lost. |
| No. 814 | Imperial Japanese Navy | The T-35-class motor torpedo boat was lost. |
| No. 820 | Imperial Japanese Navy | The T-35-class motor torpedo boat was lost. |
| No. 823 | Imperial Japanese Navy | The T-35-class motor torpedo boat was lost. |
| No. 500 | Imperial Japanese Navy | The T-33-class motor torpedo boat was lost. |
| Ölsa | Germany | World War II: The cargo ship was bombed and sunk off Langfjord near Kirkenes, Norway by Soviet aircraft. |
| Sophia | Greece | World War II: The sailing vessel was sunk in the Aegean Sea by HMS Virtue (Royal Navy). |
| T-158 | Imperial Japanese Navy | World War II: The No. 103-class landing ship was bombed, set afire, and sunk off Okinawa (14°35′N 120°59′E) by United States Navy aircraft. Her commanding officer was killed. |
| TK-682 | Soviet Navy | The G-5-class motor torpedo boat was lost on this date. |
| Takashima | Imperial Japanese Navy | World War II: Convoy No. 3927: The Sokuten-class minelayer was bombed and sunk in the Pacific Ocean north north west of Okinawa by United States Navy aircraft. |
| U-2331 | Kriegsmarine | The Type XXIII submarine sank in the Baltic Sea off Hela Pomerania in a diving accident with the loss of fifteen of her nineteen crew. |

== 11 October ==
List of shipwrecks: 11 October 1944
| Ship | State | Description |
|---|---|---|
| Baud | Germany | World War II: The cargo ship was scuttled at Maassluis, South Holland, Netherlands. |
| F 625 | Kriegsmarine | World War II: The C2 Type Marinefährprahm was torpedoed and sunk in the Adriatic Sea by HMMGB 634, HMMGB 637, HMMGB 638 and HMMGB 662 (all (Royal Navy). |
| F 942 | Kriegsmarine | World War II: The D Type Marinefährprahm was torpedoed and damaged in the Adriatic Sea by HMMGB 634, HMMGB 637, HMMGB 638 and HMMGB 662 (all (Royal Navy). She was beached but was then destroyed by Allied forces. |
| F 973 | Kriegsmarine | World War II: The D Type Marinefährprahm was torpedoed and damaged in the Adriatic Sea by HMMGB 634, HMMGB 637, HMMGB 638 and HMMGB 662 (all (Royal Navy). She was beached but was then destroyed by Allied forces. |
| Gotia | Germany | World War II: The cargo ship was bombed and sunk by Soviet aircraft at Langfjord, Norway. |
| I-O-05 | Kriegsmarine | The Siebelgefäß landing craft was sunk on this date. |
| I-O-54 | Kriegsmarine | The Siebelgefäß landing craft was sunk on this date. |
| Joshu Go | Japan | World War II: The cargo ship was torpedoed and sunk in the Formosa Strait by USS Tang (United States Navy). Eight crew were killed. |
| USS LCT-293 | United States Navy | The LCT-1-class landing craft tank foundered in heavy weather in the English Channel. |
| M 303 | Kriegsmarine | World War II: The Type 1940 minesweeper was torpedoed and sunk in the Arctic Ocean off Kiberg, Norway by TKA-205 and TKA-219 (both Soviet Navy). 52 of her 78 were crewmen killed. |
| Oita Maru | Japan | World War II: The cargo ship was torpedoed and sunk in the Formosa Strait by USS Tang (United States Navy). 26 crew were killed. |
| USS PT-368 | United States Navy | World War II: The ELCO 80'-class motor torpedo boat ran aground off Halmahera, New Guinea (01°59′N 127°57′E) and was scuttled. |
| Sarp | Germany | World War II: The cargo ship was sunk by Allied aircraft off the coast of Norway. |
| SF 45 | Kriegsmarine | The Siebel ferry was lost on this date. |
| Shtor | Germany | World War II: The cargo ship was sunk by a Soviet Douglas A-20 Havoc aircraft in the Arctic Ocean. |
| T-105 | Imperial Japanese Navy | World War II: The No. 103-class landing ship was torpedoed and sunk off the coast of Japan south of Yokosuka (33°18′N 137°42′E) by USS Trepang (United States Navy). |
| UJ 202 | Kriegsmarine | World War II: The submarine chaser was scuttled on the north coast of Molat. |
| UJ 208 | Kriegsmarine | World War II: The submarine chaser was scuttled on the north coast of Molat. |
| V 6517 | Kriegsmarine | World War II: The Vorpostenboot was torpedoed and sunk off Northern Norway by V-2 (Soviet Navy). |
| Ypanis | Greece | World War II: The cargo ship was scuttled at Piraeus, Greece. |

== 12 October ==
List of shipwrecks: 12 October 1944
| Ship | State | Description |
|---|---|---|
| Anna | Germany | World War II: The cargo ship was bombed and sunk in the Aegean Sea off Volos, Greece by Allied aircraft. |
| Asaka Maru | Imperial Japanese Navy | World War II: The Akagi Maru-class auxiliary transport was bombed and sunk in the South China Sea off the Pescadores (23°33′N 119°43′E) by United States Navy aircraft. Two crewmen were killed. |
| Braganza | Norway | The cargo ship (6,327 GRT, 1924) suffered an explosion in her engine room. She caught fire and sank in the Atlantic Ocean (approximately 32°40′S 48°30′W) with the loss of three of the 53 people on board. |
| Capadose | Germany | World War II: The cargo ship was torpedoed and sunk in the Arctic Sea off Kiberg, Norway by TK-230, TKA-238, TK-241, and TK-246 (all Soviet Navy). |
| Choan Maru | Imperial Japanese Navy | World War II: The Kinjo Maru-class auxiliary minelayer was bombed and sunk at Takao, Formosa by US Navy aircraft from Task Force 38. |
| Hakko Maru | Japan | World War II: The cargo ship was bombed and sunk in the South China Sea off Takao, Formosa (22°37′N 119°34′E) by United States Navy aircraft. |
| Hakozaki Maru | Imperial Japanese Navy | World War II: The Hakone Maru-class auxiliary transport (10,413 GRT 1922) was bombed and damaged by US Navy carrier aircraft at Kirun and was run aground. 37 crewmen were killed or wounded. The ship was refloated, repaired and returned to service by 15 November. |
| Hjvb 356 Condor | Swedish Navy | The auxiliary patrol boat was sunk by a mine during a minesweeping operation west of Malmö. Eight crew were killed and one survived. |
| Joshu Maru | Imperial Japanese Navy | World War II: The auxiliary cruiser was sunk in the South China Sea off the Pescadores by United States Navy aircraft. |
| Kokai Maru | Imperial Japanese Navy | World War II: The Shinto Maru No. 2-class auxiliary netlayer (540 GRT 1939) was bombed and sunk by Consolidated B-24 Liberator bomber aircraft 35 nautical miles (65 km; 40 mi) off Hahajima (25°56′N 141°46′E). 58 crew were killed. |
| HMS Loyal | Royal Navy | World War II: The L-class destroyer (1,920/2,660 t, 1942) struck a mine in the Tyrrhenian Sea and was severely damaged. She was declared a constructive total loss. |
| Lumme | Germany | World War II: The cargo ship was torpedoed and sunk in the Arctic Ocean off Kirkenes, Norway by S-104 (Soviet Navy). There were 19 dead and 49 survivors. |
| Manryu Maru | Japan | World War II: The cargo ship was torpedoed and sunk in the Strait of Makassar by HMS Strongbow (Royal Navy). |
| Mitsuki Maru | Imperial Japanese Army | World War II: The Type 1A Standard cargo ship was sunk in the South China Sea off Penghu, Formosa (23°30′N 119°34′E) by United States Navy aircraft from Task Force 38. Two soldiers and four crewmen were killed. |
| HMS MMS 170 | Royal Navy | World War II: The MMS-class minesweeper (255/295 t, 1942) was sunk by a mine off Gorgona Island, Italy. Seven crew were killed. There were 12 survivors. |
| Shirotae Maru | Imperial Japanese Army | World War II: The Zuikai Maru-class auxiliary transport was bombed and sunk off Penghu, Formosa (23°30′N 119°34′E) by US Navy aircraft from Task Force 38. Lost with all 78 crew. |
| TA15 | Kriegsmarine | World War II: The torpedo boat, a former Sella-class destroyer, was sunk off Piraeus, Greece by British aircraft. |
| TA17 | Kriegsmarine | World War II: The Palestro-class torpedo boat was scuttled at Piraeus. |
| TA38 | Kriegsmarine | World War II: The Ariete-class torpedo boat was scuttled as a blockship at Volos, Greece. |
| Taunus | Germany | World War II: The fishing trawler was sunk in the Baltic Sea by S-4 (Soviet Navy) with the loss of 13 lives. |
| Teisho Maru | Japan | World War II: The government chartered cargo ship was bombed and set afire by aircraft from Task Force 38 sinking alongside Pier No. 8 at Takao. Four gunners, seven Japanese, 20 German and Italian crew members are lost. The wreck was further damaged by a gale on 18 October. |
| Toko Maru | Japan | World War II: Convoy TAMA-29: The cargo ship was torpedoed and sunk in the South China Sea (23°33′N 119°43′E) by USS Ray (United States Navy). All 29 crewmen and 120 passengers were killed. |
| UJ-1220 | Kriegsmarine | World War II: The KUJ-class submarine chaser was sunk in Berlevåg, Norway, by S-104 (Soviet Navy). 25 of her 62 crew were killed. |

== 13 October ==
List of shipwrecks: 13 October 1944
| Ship | State | Description |
|---|---|---|
| Albona | Kriegsmarine | World War II: The Albona-class minesweeper was scuttled at Thessaloniki, Greece. |
| Anna | Germany | World War II: The cargo ship was sunk at Volos, Greece by aircraft of 809 Squadron, Fleet Air Arm, based on HMS Stalker (Royal Navy), |
| GK 91 | Kriegsmarine | The KFK 2-class naval drifter was lost. |
| GK 92 | Kriegsmarine | The KFK 2-class naval drifter was lost. |
| Hansei Maru | Japan | World War II: The coaster was torpedoed and sunk in the Strait of Makassar by HMS Sturdy (Royal Navy). |
| HMS HDML 1057 | Royal Navy | The Harbour Defence Motor Launch (44/52 t, 1941) was lost in an accident at Kilindili, Kenya. |
| Hilma Lau | Denmark | World War II: The cargo ship was torpedoed and sunk in the Baltic Sea south of Öland, Sweden (55°20′N 15°20′E) by L-3 (Soviet Navy) with the loss of four of her crew. |
| Kosei Maru | Japan | World War II: The coaster was torpedoed and sunk in the Strait of Makassar by HMS Sturdy (Royal Navy). |
| HMS LCT(A) 2454 | Royal Navy | The LCT-5-class landing craft tank (134/286 t, 1942) foundered off Chesil Beach, Dorset, England. Eight crew were killed. |
| Laudon | Germany | World War II: The cargo ship was sunk at Volos, Greece by aircraft of 809 Squadron, Fleet Air Arm, based on HMS Stalker (Royal Navy). |
| USS LCT-454 | United States Navy | The LCT-1-class landing craft tank was lost in heavy weather in Lyme Bay, Dorset, United Kingdom. Her three crew were rescued by rocket apparatus, but two of the rescuers lost their lives. |
| Nordpol | Germany | World War II: The coaster was sunk at Volos, Greece by aircraft of 809 Squadron, Fleet Air Arm, based on HMS Stalker (Royal Navy). |
| Rovigno | Kriegsmarine | World War II: The Albona-class minesweeper was scuttled at Salonika, Greece. |
| Shinshu Maru | Imperial Japanese Navy | World War II: Convoy No. 7222: The Shinshu Maru-class auxiliary tanker (4,182 t, 1933) was torpedoed and sunk in the South China Sea off Nha Trang, French Indochina (11°53′N 109°17′E) by USS Bergall (United States Navy). 16 crewmen were killed. |
| Steinbutt | Germany | World War II: The fishing trawler struck a mine and sank in the Kiel Canal. |
| TA38 | Kriegsmarine | World War II: The Ariete-class torpedo boat was scuttled at Volos, Greece after being damaged by aircraft from HMS Stalker (Royal Navy). |
| Terra | Germany | World War II: The tanker was torpedoed and sunk in the Baltic Sea by S-4 (Soviet Navy). |

== 14 October ==
List of shipwrecks: 14 October 1944
| Ship | State | Description |
|---|---|---|
| Eikyo Maru | Japan | World War II: The tanker was torpedoed and sunk in the South China Sea north of Borneo by USS Dace (United States Navy). |
| Fushimi Maru | Japan | World War II: The cargo ship was torpedoed and sunk in the South China Sea by USS Bonefish (United States Navy). |
| Howard L. Gibson | United States | The Liberty ship collided in the Atlantic Ocean (34°07′N 21°24′W) with Geo W McKnight (United Kingdom). She caught fire and was consequently declared a constructive total loss. |
| LS 7 | Kriegsmarine | The LS 2-class light E-boat was lost. |
| LS 10 | Kriegsmarine | The LS 2-class light E-boat was lost. |
| HMCS Magog | Royal Canadian Navy | HMCS Magog after being torpedoed World War II: Convoy ONS 33G: The River-class frigate (1,445/2,110 t, 1944) was torpedoed and damaged in the Gulf of St. Lawrence (49°12′N 67°19′W) by U-1223 (Kriegsmarine). She lost 65 feet (20 m) off her stern and was declared a constructive total loss. Three of the 150 crew were killed. |
| HMMFV 117 | Royal Navy | World War II: The MFV-1-class motor fishing vessel was lost in an explosion, probably a mine, off Pasha Island, in the Aegean Sea. Four crew were killed. |
| Nanrei Maru | Japan | World War II: The cargo ship was torpedoed and sunk in the Sulu Sea by USS Angler (United States Navy). |
| Nittetsu Maru | Japan | World War II: Convoy MI-19: The ship was torpedoed and sunk in the South China Sea north of Borneo by USS Darter (United States Navy). Twelve crewmen were killed. |
| Standard | Norway | World War II: The cargo ship (1,286 GRT, 1930) was torpedoed and sunk in Saltenfjord, Norway by HMS Viking (Royal Navy) with the loss of thirteen crew. |
| Südmeer | Kriegsmarine | World War II: The whale factory ship/repair ship was torpedoed and sunk in Porsangerfjorden, Norway by Douglas A-20 Havoc aircraft of the Soviet Naval Air Force. |
| Trabzon | Kriegsmarine | The Type A Marinefahrprahm was sunk on this date. |
| UJ 2102 Birgitta | Kriegsmarine | The armed yacht/submarine chaser was lost on this date. |
| 128 | Imperial Japanese Navy | World War II: The auxiliary naval vessel was sunk in the Makassar Strait by HMS Sturdy (Royal Navy). |

== 15 October ==
List of shipwrecks: 15 October 1944
| Ship | State | Description |
|---|---|---|
| Dan | Finland | World War II: Lapland War: The galliass was shelled and sunk in the Gulf of Finland off Osmundsholmar by U-481 (Kriegsmarine). Both crew survived. |
| DB 17 Franz Thiele | Kriegsmarine | World War II: The guard ship was bombed and sunk in the North Sea by British aircraft. |
| Endla | Finland | World War II: Lapland War: The galliass was shelled, rammed and sunk in the Gulf of Finland off Osmundsholmar by U-481 (Kriegsmarine). Both crew survived. |
| Erfurt | Germany | World War II: The transport was torpedoed and sunk in the Baltic Sea off Liepāja, Latvia by Soviet torpedo bomber aircraft. |
| I-O-95 | Kriegsmarine | World War II: The Siebelgefäß landing craft was scuttled at Itea, Greece. |
| Inger Johanne | Norway | World War II: The tanker (1,202 GRT, 1938) was sunk off Kristiansand, Norway by Bristol Beaufighter aircraft of the Royal Air Force. All 16 crew were killed or died of wounds. |
| Kaiyo Maru No. 2 | Imperial Japanese Navy | World War II: The auxiliary submarine chaser was torpedoed and sunk in the Strait of Malacca by HMS Tally-Ho (Royal Navy). |
| Kassos | Hellenic Navy | World War II: The YMS-1-class minesweeper was sunk by a mine off Piraeus, Greece. There were no casualties. |
| Kos | Hellenic Navy | World War II: The YMS-1-class minesweeper was sunk by a mine off Piraeus. Three crew were killed. |
| Leipzig | Kriegsmarine | The Leipzig-class cruiser was in a collision with Prinz Eugen (Kriegsmarine) in the Baltic Sea with the loss of 39 of her crew. She was taken in to Gotenhafen, where she was declared a constructive total loss. Repairs sufficient to keep her afloat were made and she subsequently served as a barracks ship. |
| Margarethe | Germany | World War II: The coaster was sunk in the North Sea by British aircraft. |
| HMML 870 | Royal Navy | World War II: The Fairmile B motor launch (76/86 t, 1944) was sunk by a mine off Piraeus. Four crew were killed. |
| Maria | Finland | World War II: Lapland War: The galliass was shelled, rammed and sunk in the Gulf of Finland off Osmundsholmar by U-481 (Kriegsmarine). The crew survived. |
| Norwegen | Kriegsmarine | World War II: The tanker was bombed and sunk in the North Sea off Lillesand, Norway by Allied aircraft with the loss of fifteen crew. |
| Petronella | Netherlands | World War II: The tanker struck a mine and sank in the Mediterranean Sea off Cape Kalauri (Greece) (37°34′N 23°33′E) with the loss of 24 lives. |
| U-777 | Kriegsmarine | World War II: The Type VIIC submarine was sunk off Wilhelmshaven, Lower Saxony (53°51′N 8°10′E) during a British air raid with the loss of one crew member. |
| V 1605 Mosel | Kriegsmarine | V 1605 Mosel World War II: The Vorpostenboot was bombed and sunk in the Skaggerak off Justøy, Norway by Bristol Beaufighter aircraft of 404 Squadron, Royal Canadian Air Force. 21 crew were killed. |
| V 6704 | Kriegsmarine | World War II: The KFK 2-class naval drifter was scuttled at Vadsø, Norway. |
| V 6705 | Kriegsmarine | The KFK-2-class naval drifter/Vorpostenboot was sunk on this date. |

== 16 October ==
List of shipwrecks: 16 October 1944
| Ship | State | Description |
|---|---|---|
| BK-424 | Soviet Navy | The No. 41 armored motor gunboat was lost on this date. |
| Bunzan Maru | Imperial Japanese Army | World War II: The Type 2A Wartime Standard cargo ship was bombed and sunk at the Kowloon drydock, Hong Kong (22°17′N 114°10′E) by United States Army 14th Air Force Consolidated B-24 Liberator and North American B-25 Mitchell aircraft. |
| Hato | Imperial Japanese Navy | World War II: The Otori-class torpedo boat was bombed and sunk 130 nautical miles (240 km) east south east of Hong Kong (21°54′N 116°30′E) by Consolidated B-24 Liberator aircraft of the United States Fourteenth Air Force. |
| Kyowa Maru No. 2 | Imperial Japanese Navy | World War II: The guard ship was torpedoed and sunk off the coast of Japan by USS Tilefish (United States Navy). |
| Lisca Blanca | Kriegsmarine | World War II: The tugboat was shelled and damaged by shore batteries and was run aground in the Pasman channel. Captured, pulled off, and towed away by the patrol boat PC-21 Miran ( Yugoslav Partisans). |
| Lola Schiff 29 | Kriegsmarine | World War II: The special service ship struck a mine and sank in the Aegean Sea off Salonika, Greece. |
| R 301 | Kriegsmarine | World War II: The Type R-301 minesweeper was torpedoed and sunk in the Arctic Ocean off Vardø, Norway by Soviet aircraft. 22 of her 37 crew were killed. |
| Strosmajer | Kriegsmarine | The auxiliary river minesweeper was sunk on this date. |
| TA39 | Kriegsmarine | World War II: The Ariete-class torpedo boat was sunk by a mine off Salonika. |
| U-1006 | Kriegsmarine | World War II: The Type VIIC/41 submarine was depth charged and sunk in the Atlantic Ocean south east of the Faroe Islands (60°59′N 4°49′W) by HMCS Annan (Royal Canadian Navy) with the loss of six of her 50 crew. |
| UJ 1220 | Kriegsmarine | World War II: The submarine chaser was torpedoed and sunk in Laksfjord by V-2 (Soviet Navy). |
| V 2016 | Kriegsmarine | World War II: The Vorpostenboot was sunk in the North Sea by Royal Navy motor torpedo boats. |
| V 6706 | Kriegsmarine | World War II: The KFK 2-class naval drifter was sunk at Kirkenes by Soviet aircraft. There were two dead and three wounded. |

== 17 October ==
List of shipwrecks: 17 October 1944
| Ship | State | Description |
|---|---|---|
| BMO-512 | Soviet Navy | World War II: The BMO type armored motor anti-submarine boat was torpedoed and sunk in the Baltic Sea (59°27′N 24°00′E) by U-1165 (Kriegsmarine). |
| Empire Hamble | United Kingdom | The cargo ship collided with West Cactus (United States) at Sydney, New South Wales, Australia and was damaged. Subsequently repaired and returned to service. |
| Ishikari Maru | Japan | World War II: The cargo ship was sunk at Nancowry, Nicobar Islands by Royal Navy aircraft. Eleven crewmen were killed. |
| Itsukushima | Imperial Japanese Navy | World War II: The minelayer was torpedoed and sunk in the Java Sea (5°32′S 113°48′E) by HNLMS Zwaardvisch (Royal Netherlands Navy). |
| USS Montgomery | United States Navy | World War II: The destroyer-minelayer struck a mine off Ngulu Atoll and was decommissioned. Sold for scrapping in March 1946. |
| Schiff 29 Lola | Kriegsmarine | The decoy ship was lost on this date. |
| SK 512 | Soviet Navy | The BMO type armored motor anti-submarine boat was lost on this date. |
| UJ 1764 | Kriegsmarine | World War II: The KFK 2-class naval drifter/submarine chaser struck a mine and sank in the north sea off Egersund, Norway. |
| V 6107 Wilhelm Sohle | Kriegsmarine | World War II: The Vorpostenboot was bombed and sunk in the Varangerfjord, Norway by Soviet aircraft. There were 1 dead and 56 survivors, 8 being wounded. |
| V 6801 Viking | Kriegsmarine | World War II: The Vorpostenboot was sunk in Ålesund by Bristol Beaufighter aircraft of the Royal Air Force. |
| Walter | Germany | The cargo ship was wrecked off Stavanger, Norway. |
| USS YMS-70 | United States Navy | The YMS-1-class minesweeper foundered in a storm in Leyte Gulf off Leyte, Philippines (10°56′N 125°12′E). |

== 18 October ==
List of shipwrecks: 18 October 1944
| Ship | State | Description |
|---|---|---|
| Arabia Maru | Imperial Japanese Army | World War II: "Taihi" convoy: The Hawaii Maru-class transport was torpedoed and sunk in the South China Sea west south west of Manila and 25 kilometres (16 mi) north west of Lubang Island, Philippines (14°06′N 119°40′E), by USS Bluegill (United States Navy). Captain Tsuda, 36 crew and 1,708 troops and passengers were killed. Survivors were rescued by Hakko Maru, CH-21, and PB-104 (all Imperial Japanese Navy). |
| CHa-95 | Imperial Japanese Navy | World War II: Convoy MATA-29: The CHa-1-class submarine chaser was bombed and sunk at Calayan Island, Philippines (18°54′N 121°51′E) by United States Navy aircraft. |
| Chinzei Maru | Imperial Japanese Army | World War II: "Taihi" convoy: The Type D Peacetime Standard cargo ship was torpedoed and sunk in the South China Sea west south west of Manila and north west of Lubang Island (14°06′N 119°40′E) by USS Bluegill (United States Navy). 21 passengers, 5 gunners and 28 crewmen were killed. |
| Colombia | Cuba | The Government steamer was wrecked in a hurricane at Havana. |
| HMAS Geelong | Royal Australian Navy | The Bathurst-class minesweeper (650/1,025 t, 1942) was sunk in the Solomon Sea north of Langemak, New Guinea (06°04′S 147°45′E) in a collision with the tanker York (United States). |
| Hakushika Maru | Imperial Japanese Army | World War II: "Taihi" convoy: The cargo ship (a.k.a. Hakuroku Maru) was torpedoed and sunk in the South China Sea west south west of Manila and north west of Lubang Island (14°06′N 119°40′E, by USS Bluegill (United States Navy). 1,156 troops and 30 crew were killed. |
| Hoeisan Maru | Imperial Japanese Army | World War II: The floating anti-aircraft battery, a former Horaisan Maru-class auxiliary transport (a.k.a. Hoeizan Maru), was bombed and sunk off Manila, Philippines (14°35′N 120°50′E) by United States Navy aircraft. |
| Hoten Maru | Imperial Japanese Army | World War II: Convoy MATA-29: The Dairen Maru-class auxiliary transport was bombed and sunk at Calayan Island (18°54′N 121°51′E) by United States Navy aircraft. |
| HMS LCV 801 | Royal Navy | The landing craft vehicle (10.5/12.5 t, 1943) was lost on this date. |
| USS LST-906 | United States Navy | The landing ship tank was lost by grounding off Livorno, Tuscany, Italy |
| Maeshima | Imperial Japanese Navy | World War II: Convoy TAMA-29A: The Hirashima-class minelayer was bombed and damaged in Salomague Bay, near Lopoc Bay (17°46′N 120°25′E) by United States Navy aircraft. She was beached to prevent sinking. |
| Omine Maru | Japan | World War II: Convoy MATA-29: The cargo ship (a.k.a. Taiho Maru) was bombed and sunk at Calayan Island (18°54′N 121°51′E) by United States Navy aircraft. |
| RA 2 | Kriegsmarine | World War II: The minesweeper struck a mine and sank in the North Sea north west of Ostend, West Flanders, Belgium. |
| Shinko Maru | Imperial Japanese Navy | World War II: Convoy TAMA-29A: The Shinko Maru-class minelayer was bombed in Salomague Bay, near Lopoc Bay (18°35′N 121°40′E) or (17°46′N 120°25′E) by United States Navy aircraft. She blew up and sank with all hands lost. |
| Shiranesan Maru | Imperial Japanese Army | World War II: "Taihi" convoy: The Type 1B Wartime Standard cargo ship (a.k.a. Siranesan Maru) was torpedoed and sunk in the South China Sea (12°30′N 119°10′E) by USS Raton (United States Navy). A total of 1,318 troops, her commanding officer, 61 crewmen and 47 gunners were killed. |
| Taikai Maru | Imperial Japanese Army | World War II: The cargo ship was torpedoed and sunk in the South China Sea by USS Raton (United States Navy). A total of 445 troops and 101 crewmen and gunners were killed |
| T-135 | Imperial Japanese Navy | World War II: Convoy TAMA-29A: The No.103-class landing ship was strafed, set on fire and sank in Salomague Bay, near Lopoc Bay (17°46′N 120°25′E) by United States Navy aircraft. |
| T-136 | Imperial Japanese Navy | World War II: Convoy TAMA-29A: The No.103-class landing ship was bombed and sank in Salomague Bay, near Lopoc Bay (17°46′N 120°25′E) by United States Navy aircraft. Survivors swam ashore. |
| Terukuni Maru | Japan | World War II: Convoy MATA-29: The transport was bombed and sunk at Calayan Island (18°54′N 121°51′E) by United States Navy aircraft. |
| Tsingtao Maru | Imperial Japanese Army | World War II: Convoy MATA-29: The Dairen Maru-class auxiliary transport was bombed and sunk at Calayan Island (18°54′N 121°51′E) by United States Navy aircraft. |

== 19 October ==
List of shipwrecks: 19 October 1944
| Ship | State | Description |
|---|---|---|
| Belgium Maru | Imperial Japanese Army | World War II: The Daifuku Maru No. 1-class transport was being used as a stationary anti-aircraft battery when she was bombed and sunk in Manila Harbour (14°35′N 120°55′E) by United States Navy aircraft. |
| I-O-07 | Kriegsmarine | The Siebelgefäß landing craft was sunk on this date. |
| I-O-12 | Kriegsmarine | The Siebelgefäß landing craft was sunk on this date. |
| I-O-68 | Kriegsmarine | The Siebelgefäß landing craft was sunk on this date. |
| I-O-74 | Kriegsmarine | The Siebelgefäß landing craft was sunk on this date. |
| I-O-96 | Kriegsmarine | The Siebelgefäß landing craft was sunk on this date. |
| Jogu Maru | Japan | World War II: The cargo ship was bombed and sunk in Manila Harbour (14°35′N 120°55′E) by United States Navy aircraft. |
| Juan Casiano | Mexico | The tanker sank in a gale 90 nautical miles (170 km) off Savannah, Georgia, United States with the loss of all 21 crew. |
| Kattrepel | Kriegsmarine | World War II: The weapons training ship struck a mine and sank in the Kattegat off Aalborg, Denmark. |
| KT-321 | Soviet Navy | World War II: The minesweeper struck a mine and sank in the Baltic Sea off Reval, Estonia. |
| HMS LCT 480 | Royal Navy | The LCT-3-class landing craft tank (350/625 t, 1944) sank in a storm off Land's End, Cornwall while being towed to the Pacific Ocean. |
| HMS LCT 488 | Royal Navy | The LCT-3-class landing craft tank (350/625 t, 1944) sank in a storm off Land's End, Cornwall while being towed to the Pacific Ocean. Wreck probably of 488 discovered in 2023 50 miles off the coast of Cornwall, England in nearly 100 meters-328 feet of water. |
| HMS LCT 491 | Royal Navy | The LCT-3-class landing craft tank (350/625 t, 1944) sank in a storm off Land's End, Cornwall while being towed to the Pacific Ocean. |
| HMS LCT 494 | Royal Navy | The LCT-3-class landing craft tank (350/625 t, 1944) sank in a storm off Land's End, Cornwall while being towed to the Pacific Ocean. |
| HMS LCT 7014 | Royal Navy | The LCT-3-class landing craft tank (350/625 t, 1944) sank in a storm off Land's End, Cornwall while being towed to the Pacific Ocean. |
| HMS LCT 7015 | Royal Navy | The LCT-3-class landing craft tank (350/625 t, 1944) sank in a storm off Land's End, Cornwall while being towed to the Pacific Ocean. |
| MAL 5 | Kriegsmarine | The MAL 1 type landing fire support lighter disappeared between Leros and Salonica. There were no survivors. |
| MAL 6 | Kriegsmarine | World War II: The MAL 1 type landing fire support lighter was scuttled off Slano. |
| Nichizui Maru | Japan | World War II: Convoy YUTA-12: The transport was skip bombed and sunk south of Hong Kong by North American B-25 Mitchell aircraft. Four troops and 50 crewmen were killed. |
| TA18 | Kriegsmarine | World War II: The Palestro-class torpedo boat was shelled, beached and scuttled at Samos, Greece. |
| Toshikawa Maru | Japan | World War II: The cargo ship was bombed and sunk in Manila Harbour (14°35′N 120°55′E) by United States Navy aircraft. |
| U-957 | Kriegsmarine | The Type VIIC submarine collided with a German merchant ship at Lofoten, Norway. She was consequently withdrawn from service as a result of damage sustained. |
| Vs 909 Tormilind | Kriegsmarine | World War II: The torpedo boat struck a mine and sank in the Kattegat off Aalborg. |

== 20 October ==
List of shipwrecks: 20 October 1944
| Ship | State | Description |
|---|---|---|
| I-O-170 | Kriegsmarine | The Siebelgefäß landing craft was sunk on this date. |
| Jason | Norway | World War II: The coaster (296 GRT, 1908) was bombed and sunk in Persfjord, Norway by Soviet Air Force aircraft. |
| KT-340 | Soviet Navy | World War II: The minesweeper struck a mine and sank in Riga Bay. |
| MAL 7 | Kriegsmarine | The MAL 1 type landing fire support lighter was lost on this date. |
| Mersin | Kriegsmarine | The Type A Marinefahrprahm was sunk on this date. |
| Milos | Germany | World War II: The cargo ship struck a mine and sank off Kristiansand, Norway (58°13′N 6°17′E). |
| Oyo Maru | Imperial Japanese Navy | World War II: Convoy SAMA-13: The Choyo Maru-class auxiliary transport was torpedoed and sunk in the South China Sea north west of Miri, Borneo (04°45′N 113°30′E) by USS Hammerhead (United States Navy). A passenger and three crewmen were killed. |
| UJ 1219 | Kriegsmarine | World War II: The KUJ-class submarine chaser was sunk off Cape Nordkinn, Finnmark by V-4 (Soviet Navy). 46 of her 61 crew were killed. |
| Ugo Maru | Japan | World War II: Convoy SAMA-13: The Eastern Sword-class cargo ship was torpedoed and sunk in the South China Sea north west of Miri (04°45′N 113°30′E) by USS Hammerhead (United States Navy). Twenty-four crewmen were killed. |

== 21 October ==
List of shipwrecks: 21 October 1944
| Ship | State | Description |
|---|---|---|
| AF 6 | Kriegsmarine | World War II: The Artilleriefährprahm was bombed and sunk at Kirkenes, Norway by Soviet aircraft. |
| AF 576 | Kriegsmarine | World War II: The Artilleriefährprahm was bombed and sunk at Kirkenes by Soviet aircraft. |
| CHa-15 | Imperial Japanese Navy | World War II: The CHa-1-class submarine chaser was bombed and sunk off the Philippines by American aircraft. |
| Dogo Maru | Imperial Japanese Army | World War II: The Dogo Maru-class auxiliary transport was bombed and sunk off Romblon Island, Philippines (12°35′N 122°16′E) by US Navy aircraft. |
| Hohenhörn | Germany | World War II: The cargo ship struck a mine and sank off Gothenburg, Sweden. |
| Jason | Germany | World War II: The tug was bombed and sunk in the Baltic by Soviet bombers. |
| HMS LCP(R) 1011 | Royal Navy | The landing craft personnel (ramped) (5.9/8.2 t, 1942) was lost on this date. |
| M 31 | Kriegsmarine | World War II: The Type 1935 minesweeper was torpedoed and sunk off Honningsvåg, Norway by TKA-215 (Soviet Navy). 58 of her 111 crewmen were killed. |
| M 3155 | Kriegsmarine | World War II: The KFK 2-class naval drifter/minesweeper was bombed and sunk in the Baltic Sea off the Sõrve Peninsula, Saaremaa, Estonia by Soviet aircraft. |
| NB-13 Partizan | Yugoslav Partisans | World War II: The gunboat was sunk by British aircraft at Olib, Yugoslavia. Two crew were wounded. |
| R 151 | Kriegsmarine | World War II: The Type R-151 minesweeper was bombed and sunk by Soviet aircraft at Vardø, Finnmark. There were one dead. |
| Ryochi Maru | Imperial Japanese Army | World War II: The Imperial Japanese Army auxiliary transport was bombed and sunk in the Visayan Sea about four nautical miles (7.4 km; 4.6 mi) west north west of Bantayan, Bantayan Island (11°11′N 123°39′E) by United States Navy carrier aircraft. Eight crew killed. |
| SF 151 | Kriegsmarine | World War II: The Siebel ferry was bombed and sunk in the Baltic by Soviet bomber aircraft. |
| T-2 | Soviet Navy | World War II: The tug struck a mine and sank in the Baltic Sea off Reval. |
| TK 9 | Soviet Navy | The D-3-class motor torpedo boat was lost on this date. |
| UJ 1111 | Kriegsmarine | World War II: The Mob-FD1-class submarine chaser was torpedoed and sunk off Lister, Norway by HMS Sceptre (Royal Navy). |
| Vestra | Norway | World War II: The coaster (1,422 GRT, 1904) was bombed and sunk off Haugesund, Norway by de Havilland Mosquito aircraft of 235, and 248 Squadrons, Royal Air Force and 404 Squadron, Royal Canadian Air Force. All crew were rescued. |
| Wa-8 | Imperial Japanese Navy | World War II: The Wa-1-class minesweeper was sunk off Panay, Philippines by American aircraft. |

== 22 October ==
List of shipwrecks: 22 October 1944
| Ship | State | Description |
|---|---|---|
| Biri | Norway | World War II: The coaster (940 GRT, 1914) ran aground in Norwegian waters and was abandoned. She was bombed and sunk the next day by de Havilland Mosquito aircraft of 235 and 248 Squadrons, Royal Air Force. Raised in 1947, repaired and returned to service. |
| Kokuryu Maru | Japan | World War II: The cargo liner was torpedoed and sunk in the South China Sea off Batan Island by USS Seadragon (United States Navy). |
| M 3153 | Kriegsmarine | World War II: The KFK-2-class naval drifter/minesweeper was bombed and sunk in the Baltic Sea off the Ventspils, Latvia by Soviet aircraft. |
| Muroto | Imperial Japanese Navy | World War II: Convoy KATA-916: The Muroto-class supply ship was torpedoed and sank in the East China Sea, south of Suwanosejima, (29°18′N 129°44′E) by USS Sea Dog (United States Navy). |
| Taiten Maru | Japan | World War II: The cargo liner was torpedoed and sunk in the South China Sea off Batan Island by USS Seadragon (United States Navy). |
| Tomitsu Maru | Imperial Japanese Navy | World War II: The auxiliary gunboat was torpedoed and sunk in the East China Sea by USS Sea Dog (United States Navy). |
| V 6308 Mob-FD 2 Jupiter | Kriegsmarine | World War II: The Vorpostenboot was bombed and severely damaged in Syltefjord by Soviet aircraft. |
| V 6311 Polarstern | Kriegsmarine | World War II: The Vorpostenboot was bombed and sunk in Syltefjord by Soviet aircraft. |

== 23 October ==
List of shipwrecks: 23 October 1944
| Ship | State | Description |
|---|---|---|
| Aalen | Germany | The cargo ship struck a submerged wreck in the Baltic Sea. She foundered the next day at 54°38′N 2°25′E). |
| Atago | Imperial Japanese Navy | World War II: Battle of the Palawan Passage: The Takao-class cruiser was torpedoed and sunk in 1,000 fathoms (6,000 ft; 1,800 m) of water in the Palawan Passage (9°28′N 117°17′E) by USS Darter (United States Navy) with the loss of 360 of her 1,060 crew. 171 survivors were rescued by Asashimo, and 529 survivors including Vice Admiral Kurita, his chief of staff Rear Admiral Koyanagi Tomiji, and Atago's commanding officer Rear Admiral Araki Tsutau were rescued by Kishinami (both Imperial Japanese Navy). |
| Hakuran Maru | Japan | World War II: The cargo ship was torpedoed and sunk in the Pacific Ocean south west of Kyushu by USS Croaker (United States Navy). |
| Kikusu Maru | Japan | World War II: The tanker was torpedoed and sunk in the South China Sea by USS Snook (United States Navy). |
| Kimikawa Maru | Imperial Japanese Navy | World War II: Convoy MATA-30: The Kamikawa Maru-class auxiliary transport, a former auxiliary seaplane tender, was torpedoed and sunk in the South China Sea south of Formosa and west north west of Cape Bojeudor, Luzon, Philippines (18°58′N 118°46′E) by USS Sawfish (United States Navy). Eighty-one passengers and 24 crewmen were killed. |
| HMS LCT 1171 | Royal Navy | The LCT-4-class landing craft tank (350/586 t, 1944) was lost on this date. |
| Margareta | Germany | World War II: The cargo ship was bombed and sunk by aircraft off Northern Norway. |
| Maya | Imperial Japanese Navy | World War II: Battle of the Palawan Passage: The Takao-class cruiser was torpedoed and sunk in the Palawan Passage (9°27′N 117°23′E) by USS Dace (United States Navy) with the loss of 336 of her 1,105 crew. Survivors were rescued by Akishimo, which transferred them to Musashi (both Imperial Japanese Navy); 143 of them were lost when Musashi was sunk on 24 October. |
| Shinsei Maru No.1 | Japan | World War II: The cargo liner was torpedoed and sunk in the South China Sea (19°44′N 118°25′E) by USS Snook (United States Navy). |
| T-379 | Soviet Navy | World War II: The T-351 Project 253l type MT-1-class minesweeper struck a mine and sank in the Baltic Sea off Reval, Estonia. |
| Tatsuju Maru | Japan | World War II: The cargo liner was torpedoed and sunk in the South China Sea north west of Mako, Pescadore Islands, by USS Tang (United States Navy). Two troops and five crewmen were killed. |
| TK-9 | Soviet Navy | World War II: The torpedo boat struck a mine and sank in the Baltic Sea south of Saaremaa, Estonia. |
| Toun Maru | Imperial Japanese Army | World War II: The Toun Maru-class auxiliary transport was torpedoed and burned out in the Formosa Strait north north west of Mako by USS Tang (United States Navy). A total of 131 troops, five passengers, twelve gunners and sixteen crewmen were killed. Towed to Mako, Pescadores and then to Takao and declared a constructive total loss. Scrapped in 1945. |
| V-5506 Zick | Kriegsmarine | World War II: The vorpostenboot was sunk in the North Sea off Bergen, Norway by de Havilland Mosquito aircraft of 235 and 248 Squadrons, Royal Air Force. |
| U-985 | Kriegsmarine | World War II: The Type VIIC submarine struck a mine at Lista, Norway and was severely damaged. She was consequently withdrawn from service and decommissioned on 15 November 1944. |
| Wakatake Maru | Japan | World War II: The cargo liner was torpedoed and sunk in the South China Sea north north west of Mako (24°49′N 120°26′E) by USS Tang (United States Navy). A total of 128 troops, seven passengers, eleven gunners and 30 crewmen were killed. |
| Zabreb | Kriegsmarine | The auxiliary river minesweeper was sunk on this date. |

== 24 October ==
List of shipwrecks: 24 October 1944
| Ship | State | Description |
|---|---|---|
| Arisan Maru | Japan | World War II: Convoy MATA-30: The hell ship was torpedoed and sunk in the South China Sea (20°00′N 118°44′E) by USS Shark (United States Navy) while carrying 1,781 prisoners of war. A total of American 1,773 prisoners of war (POWs), 27 Japanese passengers, thirteen gunners and two crewmen were killed. Over 300 survivors, and 9 POWs rescued by Take (Imperial Japanese Navy). |
| Augustus Thomas | United States | World War II: The Liberty ship was severely damaged by a Japanese aircraft that struck her off Leyte, Philippines, after being set ablaze by anti-aircraft fire. There were no casualties. She was beached one mile (1.6 km) east of the Palo River. Eventually refloated and declared a total loss. The vessel was towed to Australia and then to California arriving in early 1946, scrapped in 1957. |
| USS Darter | United States Navy | World War II: The Gato-class submarine ran aground in the Palawan Passage, Philippines and was scuttled to prevent capture by the Japanese. The entire crew was picked up by USS Dace (United States Navy). |
| Daiten Maru | Japan | World War II: Convoy MATA-30: The transport was torpedoed and sunk in the South China Sea north west of Vigan, Luzon, Philippines (20°12′N 119°01′E) by USS Seadragon (United States Navy). Five crewman were killed. |
| Eiko Maru | Japan | World War II: Convoy MATA-30: The transport was torpedoed and sunk in the South China Sea north west of Vigan (20°35′N 118°32′E) by USS Seadragon (United States Navy). A crewman and three survivors of Shinsei Maru No. 1 (Japan) were killed. |
| F 433 | Kriegsmarine | World War II: The Type C2 Marinefahrprahm was shelled and sunk in error by UJ 202 and UJ 208 (both Kriegsmarine) in the Adriatic Sea south of Jablanac, during a battle against British motor torpedo boats. There were 7 dead and 14 wounded. |
| F 599 | Kriegsmarine | World War II: The Type C2 Marinefahrprahm was scuttled in the Baltic Sea off Sõrve Peninsula due to damage suffered in the days before in ground and air attacks. |
| Gassan Maru | Japan | World War II: Convoy MOMA-06: The transport ship was torpedoed and sunk in the Pacific Ocean south west of Kyushu by USS Croaker (United States Navy), or damaged, towed to Saishu Island where the troops she was carrying where put ashore without further information on the ship. |
| Glommen 4 | Kriegsmarine | The coaster (103 GRT, 1938) was run aground by her crew at Jakobsnes, Norway and an attempt was made to set her on fire. Sold post-war, repaired and converted to a fishing vessel, entering service in 1949 as Henningsvær. |
| Hunte | Germany | World War II: The cargo ship was bombed and sunk in the North Sea off Vlieland, Friesland, Netherlands. |
| Ikutagawa Maru | Japan | World War II: The Standard 2D Type cargo ship was torpedoed and sunk in the Pacific Ocean off Chichi-jima by USS Kingfish (United States Navy). |
| Kikusui Maru | Imperial Japanese Army | World War II: Convoy MATA-30: The transport was torpedoed and sunk in the South China Sea north west of Vigan (19°46′N 118°30′E) by USS Snook (United States Navy). Her captain and 11 crew were killed. |
| Kokuryu Maru | Imperial Japanese Army | World War II: Convoy MATA-30: The Kokuryu Maru-class auxiliary transport was torpedoed and sunk in the South China Sea north west of Vigan (19°42′N 118°38′E) by USS Snook or USS Icefish (both United States Navy). A total of 324 passengers, five gunners and 63 crew were killed. |
| Kori Go Maru | Japan | World War II: The cargo liner was torpedoed and sunk in the South China Sea north north west of Mako, Pescadore Islands, (24°42′N 120°21′E) by USS Tang (United States Navy). A crewman was killed. |
| USS LCI (L)-1065 | United States Navy | World War II: The landing craft infantry was sunk when an Imperial Japanese Army Mitsubishi Ki-21 "Sally" aircraft hit by anti-aircraft fire crashed into her in Leyte Gulf. Seven crew were killed, five reported missing and nine suffered severe burns, one dying later. |
| Linnea | Finland | World War II: The galliass was torpedoed and sunk in the Baltic Sea of Odensholm by U-958 (Kriegsmarine). There were no survivors. |
| Mikage Maru | Imperial Japanese Army | World War II: Convoy MOMA-06: The Mikage Maru-class auxiliary transport ship was torpedoed and sunk in the East China Sea (33°00′N 125°49′E) by USS Croaker (United States Navy). 27 crewmen were killed. |
| Musashi | Imperial Japanese Navy | Musashi World War II: The Yamato-class battleship was bombed and sunk in the Sibuyan Sea by aircraft from USS Essex, USS Franklin and USS Intrepid (all United States Navy) with the loss of 1,023 of her 2,399 crew. Wreck located in March 2015. |
| Panuco | Italy | World War II: The tanker was shelled and sunk as a blockship at Genoa, Italy. The wreck was dispersed in April 1948 as it was a danger to navigation. |
| Pelagos | Germany | World War II: The depot ship was sunk at Kirkenes, Norway. She was refloated in 1945, repaired and returned to Norwegian service in 1946. |
| USS Princeton | United States Navy | USS Princeton and USS Birmingham World War II: Battle of Leyte Gulf: The Independence-class aircraft carrier was damaged by an Imperial Japanese Navy Yokosuka D4Y "Judy" kamikaze aircraft attack with the loss of 108 of her 1,469 crew. Survivors were rescued by USS Birmingham and USS Irwin (both United States Navy). Princeton was then scuttled by USS Reno (United States Navy). |
| USS Shark | United States Navy | World War II: The Balao-class submarine was depth charged and sunk in the Luzon Strait by Harukaze and Take (both Imperial Japanese Navy), with the loss of all 81 crew. |
| Shikisan Maru | Japan | World War II: Convoy MATA-30: The transport was torpedoed and sunk in the South China Sea north west of Vigan (20°27′N 118°31′E) by USS Drum (United States Navy). Four passengers and seventeen crew were killed. |
| Shinsei Maru No. 1 | Imperial Japanese Army | World War II: Convoy MATA-30: The Daifuku Maru No. 1-class auxiliary transport was torpedoed and sunk in the South China Sea north west of Vigan (20°31′N 118°42′E) by the submarine USS Snook (United States Navy). Three gunners and ten crew were killed. One hundred survivors were rescued by Eiko Maru (Japan). |
| USS Sonoma | United States Navy | World War II: The Sonoma-class fleet tug was set on fire when a heavily damaged Japanese bomber aircraft's wing struck her funnel spreading flaming gasoline over the ship. The bomber crashed into Augustus Thomas (United States) and the detonation of its bombs did further damage. An attempt was made to beach the severely damaged Sonoma, but she sank off Dio Island, Leyte Gulf, Philippines. Eight crew were killed or died of wounds. |
| Tenshin Maru | Japan | World War II: Convoy MATA-30: The transport was torpedoed and sunk in the South China Sea north west of Vigan (19°42′N 118°38′E) by USS Snook (United States Navy) or USS Shark (United States Navy). Five gunners and 47 crew were killed. |
| U-673 | Kriegsmarine | The Type VIIC submarine collided in the North Sea north of Stavanger, Norway with U-382 (Kriegsmarine) and was beached near Smaaskär (59°20′N 5°53′E), where she later sank. Raised on 9 November 1944, towed to Stavanger and surrendered to Norway, subsequently scrapped. U-382 was withdrawn from service due to damage sustained. |
| UJ 1411 Treff III | Kriegsmarine | World War II: The submarine chaser/naval whaler struck a mine and sank in the Bay of Biscay off Saint-Nazaire, France. The crew was rescued. |
| V 6111 Masuren | Kriegsmarine | World War II: The Vorpostenboot was torpedoed and sunk in Korsfjord, Norway by Douglas A-20 Havoc aircraft of the Soviet Naval Air Force. 11 of her 51 crew were killed. |
| Wakaba | Imperial Japanese Navy | World War II: Battle of Leyte Gulf: The Hatsuharu-class destroyer was bombed and sunk west of Panay (11°50′N 121°25′E) by aircraft based on USS Franklin (United States Navy) with the loss of 58 of her 200 crew. Survivors were rescued by Hatsuharu and Hatsushimo (both Imperial Japanese Navy). |

== 25 October ==
List of shipwrecks: 25 October 1944
| Ship | State | Description |
|---|---|---|
| Akizuki | Imperial Japanese Navy | Akizuki explodes World War II: Battle of Leyte Gulf: The Akizuki-class destroyer was torpedoed and sunk in the Pacific Ocean by United States Navy aircraft or torpedoed and sunk by USS Halibut (United States Navy). She blew up with the loss of 183 of her crew. One hundred and forty-five survivors were rescued by Maki (Imperial Japanese Navy) and one later by the United States Navy. |
| Asagumo | Imperial Japanese Navy | World War II: Battle of Surigao Strait: The Asashio-class destroyer was torpedoed, shelled and sunk in the Surigao Strait (1°59′S 104°56′E) by United States Navy ships with the loss of 191 of her 230 crew and all survivors from Fusō (Imperial Japanese Navy) which she had rescued earlier that day. |
| HMS BYMS 2077 | Royal Navy | World War II: The YMS-1-class minesweeper (207/320 t, 1943) sunk by mine in Gulf of Corinth, Greece. 20 crew were killed. |
| CHa-52 | Imperial Japanese Navy | The CHa-1-class submarine chaser was lost at Palau to an unknown cause. |
| Chikuma | Imperial Japanese Navy | World War II: Battle off Samar: The Tone-class cruiser was torpedoed and sunk by Grumman TBM Avenger aircraft based on USS Kitkun Bay, USS Natoma Bay and USS Ommaney Bay (all United States Navy) in the Philippine Sea off Samar Island (11°25′N 126°36′E). All but one of her survivors were rescued by Nowaki (Imperial Japanese Navy) but were lost with the sinking of that ship the next day. The one survivor was not picked up but drifted to shore alive and/or one survivor rescued by a US ship on 28 October. |
| Chitose | Imperial Japanese Navy | World War II: Battle of Leyte Gulf: The Chitose-class aircraft carrier was bombed and sunk in Leyte Gulf (19°20′N 126°20′E) by aircraft based on USS Essex and USS Lexington (both United States Navy) with the loss of 903 of her 1,504 crew. Survivors were rescued by Isuzu and Shimotsuki (both Imperial Japanese Navy). |
| Chiyoda | Imperial Japanese Navy | World War II: Battle of Leyte Gulf: The Chitose-class aircraft carrier was bombed and damaged in Leyte Gulf by aircraft based on USS Franklin and USS Lexington (both United States Navy). She was then shelled and sunk by USS Mobile, USS New Orleans, USS Santa Fe and USS Wichita (all United States Navy) with the loss of all 800 crew. |
| Chōkai | Imperial Japanese Navy | World War II: Battle off Samar: The Takao-class cruiser was bombed by United States Navy aircraft, and shelled by USS Samuel B. Roberts and USS White Plains (both United States Navy), in the Philippine Sea off Samar Island (11°22′N 126°22′E). She was scuttled by Fujinami (Imperial Japanese Navy) which also rescued her survivors. |
| D-202 | Free French Naval Forces | World War II: The YMS-1-class minesweeper sunk by mine off Marseille, France. |
| Ebara Maru | Japan | World War II: Convoy MI-23: The Standard 2AT-class oiler was torpedoed and sunk in the Formosa Strait (25°04′N 119°35′E) by USS Tang (United States Navy). Eleven crew were killed. Survivors were rescued by the frigate CD-34 (Imperial Japanese Navy). |
| Fusō | Imperial Japanese Navy | World War II: Battle of Surigao Strait. The Fusō-class battleship was torpedoed and sunk by USS Melvin (United States Navy). |
| USS Gambier Bay | United States Navy | World War II: Battle of Leyte Gulf: The Casablanca-class escort carrier was sunk in the Pacific Ocean near Samar, Philippines by Imperial Japanese Navy gunfire. |
| Hakuyo Maru | Japan | World War II: Convoy WO-303: The transport ship was torpedoed and sunk in the Pacific Ocean off the Kuril Islands (50°21′N 150°20′E) by USS Seal (United States Navy). A total of 1,312 navy passengers, 26 gunners and 113 crewmen were killed. |
| Hatsuzuki | Imperial Japanese Navy | World War II: Battle off Cape Engaño: The Akizuki-class destroyer was shelled and sunk east north east of Cape Engaño, Philippines (20°24′N 126°20′E) by USS Wichita (United States Navy). |
| USS Hoel | United States Navy | World War II: Battle off Samar: The Fletcher-class destroyer was shelled and sunk in the Pacific Ocean off Samar by Kongō (Imperial Japanese Navy) with the loss of 253 of her 349 crew. |
| Jinei Maru | Imperial Japanese Navy | World War II: The Type 2TL oiler was torpedoed and sunk in the Pacific Ocean south of Yaku Jima, Japan, by USS Sterlet (United States Navy). Survivors were rescued by Akikaze (Imperial Japanese Navy). |
| USS Johnston | United States Navy | World War II: Battle off Samar: The Fletcher-class destroyer was shelled and sunk in the Pacific Ocean off Samar (11°46′N 126°09′E) by Imperial Japanese Navy warships with the loss of 186 of her 327 crew. Wreck located in 2021 in 21,180 feet (6,460 m) of water, the deepest shipwreck surveyed. |
| HMS LCT 1045 | Royal Navy | The LCT-4-class landing craft tank (350/586 t, 1944) sank while under tow in the English Channel. |
| M 3117 | Kriegsmarine | World War II: The KFK 2-class naval drifter/minesweeper was sunk in the Baltic Sea by Soviet aircraft. |
| Matsumoto Maru | Japan | World War II: Convoy MI-23: The Imperial Japanese Navy-chartered Lima Maru-class cargo ship was torpedoed and damaged in the Formosa Strait off Turnabout Island by USS Tang (United States Navy). She was beached in Chuanchow Bay, capsizing the next day and becoming a total loss. There were no casualties. |
| Michishio | Imperial Japanese Navy | World War II: Battle of Surigao Strait: The Asashio-class destroyer was torpedoed and sunk in the Surigao Strait (10°25′N 125°23′E) by USS Hutchins and USS McDermut (both United States Navy). |
| Mogami | Imperial Japanese Navy | World War II: Battle of the Surigao Strait: The Mogami-class cruiser was shelled by USS Denver, USS Louisville and USS Portland (all United States Navy) and was then bombed by Grumman TBF Avenger aircraft. She was scuttled with a torpedo in the Surigao Strait (9°40′N 124°50′E) by Akebono (Imperial Japanese Navy) with the loss of 191 crewmen. The cruiser's commanding and executive officers and one Navy civilian employee were killed. Akebono rescued 700 crew, four of whom died later from wounds. |
| NKI 05 Sperber | Kriegsmarine | World War II: The naval trawler which had struck a mine and been damaged two days earlier, was scuttled by M 322 (Kriegsmarine). |
| USS PT-493 | United States Navy | World War II: Battle of Surigao Strait: The ELCO 80'-class PT boat was shelled and sunk in the Surigao Strait (10°15′N 125°23′E) by Imperial Japanese Navy warships. |
| R-250 | Kriegsmarine | World War II: The Type R-218 minesweeper was sunk by British aircraft in Bassfjord. |
| Randwijk | Germany | World War II: The cargo ship was sunk in an Allied air raid on Hamburg. She was refloated in April 1947 and scrapped in April 1948. |
| S 56 | Kriegsmarine | World War II: The torpedo boat was sunk at Šibenik, Yugoslavia by British de Havilland Mosquito aircraft. |
| USS Samuel B. Roberts | United States Navy | World War II: Battle off Samar: The John C. Butler-class destroyer escort was shelled and sunk in the Pacific Ocean off Samar 11°40′N 126°20′E) by Kongō (Imperial Japanese Navy) with the loss of 89 of her 209 crew. |
| HMCS Skeena | Royal Canadian Navy | The River-class destroyer (1,337/1,747 t, 1931) was driven ashore at Viðey, Iceland in a storm and was wrecked with the loss of fifteen of her 181 crew. |
| USS St. Lo | United States Navy | USS St. Lo World War II: Battle of Leyte Gulf: The Casablanca-class escort carrier was sunk in the Pacific Ocean near Leyte, Philippines by Japanese kamikaze aircraft with the loss of about 140 of her 889 crew. Survivors were rescued by USS Dennis, USS Heermann, USS John C. Butler and USS Raymond (all United States Navy). |
| Suzuya | Imperial Japanese Navy | World War II: Battle off Samar: The Mogami-class cruiser was bombed and damaged by United States Navy aircraft in the Philippine Sea off Samar Island (11°45′N 126°11′E). After fires detonate her torpedoes and ammunition she was scuttled by Okinami (Imperial Japanese Navy) who also rescued her Captain and 401 crewmen. 247 crew killed. |
| TA31 | Kriegsmarine | World War II: The torpedo boat, a former Freccia-class destroyer, was damaged beyond repair in an American air raid on Genoa, Italy. |
| Tama | Imperial Japanese Navy | World War II: The Kuma-class light cruiser was torpedoed and sunk with all hands by the submarine USS Jallao (United States Navy) at (21°23′N 127°19′E) after the Battle of Leyte Gulf. |
| USS Tang | United States Navy | World War II: Convoy MI-23: The Balao-class submarine was sunk by the malfunction of one of her own torpedoes in the Formosa Strait off Turnabout Island (25°06′N 119°31′E) with the loss of 74 of her 85 crew. The survivors were rescued by the frigate CD-34 (Imperial Japanese Navy) and taken as prisoners of war. |
| Theresia Wallner | Kriegsmarine | The auxiliary river minelayer was sunk on this date. |
| UJ-2110 | Kriegsmarine | World War II: The submarine chaser was scuttled in Saloniki Bay. |
| Wakaba | Imperial Japanese Navy | World War II: Battle of Leyte Gulf: The Hatsuharu-class destroyer was bombed and sunk in the Pacific Ocean off the west coast of Panay Island, Philippines (11°50′N 121°25′E) by aircraft from USS Franklin (United States Navy) with the loss of 48 of her 200 crew. Survivors were rescued by Hatsuharu and Hatsushimo (both Imperial Japanese Navy). |
| Wangerooge | Germany | World War II: The cargo ship struck a mine and sank off Stad, Norway. |
| Yamagumo | Imperial Japanese Navy | World War II: Battle of Surigao Strait: The Asashio-class destroyer was torpedoed and sunk in the Surigao Strait (10°25′N 125°23′E) by USS McDermut (United States Navy) with the loss of all 200 crew. |
| Yamashiro | Imperial Japanese Navy | World War II: Battle of Surigao Strait: The Fusō-class battleship was sunk by gunfire from USS Tennessee (United States Navy) with the loss of all but ten of her 1,400 crew. |
| Zuihō | Imperial Japanese Navy | Zuihō World War II: Battle off Cape Engaño: The Zuihō-class aircraft carrier was bombed and sunk by aircraft from USS Hornet (United States Navy) with the loss off 215 of her 974 crew. Survivors were rescued by Ise and Kuwa (both Imperial Japanese Navy). |
| Zuikaku | Imperial Japanese Navy | Zuikaku sinking World War II: Battle of Leyte Gulf: The Shōkaku-class aircraft carrier was bombed and sunk in Leyte Gulf by aircraft based on USS Lexington (United States Navy) with the loss of 843 of her 1,705 crew. Survivors were rescued by Kuwa and Wakatsuki (both Imperial Japanese Navy). |
| 136 | Japan | World War II: The lighter was sunk in the Makassar Strait by HMS Tantivy (Royal Navy). |

== 26 October ==
List of shipwrecks: 26 October 1944
| Ship | State | Description |
|---|---|---|
| Abukuma | Imperial Japanese Navy | World War II: The Nagara-class cruiser was bombed and sunk in the Sulu Sea off Negros, Philippines (09°20′N 122°32′E) by Consolidated B-24 Liberator aircraft of the 5th Bomb Group, United States Thirteenth Air Force during the withdrawal following the Battle of Surigao Strait. Two hundred and fifty crewmen were killed. Her captain and 283 crewmen were rescued by Ushio (Imperial Japanese Navy). |
| Bærum | Norway | World War II: The coaster (203 GRT, 1922) was bombed and sunk at Rørvik, Norway by Allied aircraft with the loss of a crew member. |
| Comos | Kriegsmarine | World War II: The auxiliary river minesweeper was scuttled on km 1462 of the Danube, near Dunaszekcső. |
| Daihako Maru | Japan | World War II: Convoy MOMA-05: The cargo ship was torpedoed in the Pacific Ocean (19°07′N 120°42′E) by USS Drum (United States Navy). Her fore section sank while her aft section remained afloat and was beached in Lompoc Bay. 1,557 troops and 3 crew died. |
| Daisho Maru | Japan | World War II: Convoy MOMA-05: The cargo ship was torpedoed and sunk in the Pacific Ocean (19°30′N 120°44′E) by USS Drum (United States Navy). 1,600 died. |
| F 201 | Kriegsmarine | World War II: The Type A Marinefahrprahm was scuttled at Neiden, Norway due to damage from air attack. |
| F 232 | Kriegsmarine | World War II: The Type A Marinefahrprahm was scuttled near Neiden, Norway due to damage from air attack. |
| FR-2 | Kriegsmarine | World War II: The FR 1-class river minesweeper was scuttled on km 1462 of the Danube, near Dunaszekcső. |
| Hayashimo | Imperial Japanese Navy | World War II: Battle of Leyte Gulf: The Fubuki-class destroyer was torpedoed and had her bow blown off by an aircraft based on USS Hornet (United States Navy). She was beached and partially sank in shallow water on Semirara Island 40 nautical miles (74 km) south east of Mindoro, Philippines (12°50′N 121°21′E). One hundred and twenty survivors abandoned the wreck on 12 November. |
| I-26 | Imperial Japanese Navy | World War II: Battle of Leyte Gulf: The B1 type submarine was sunk in the Pacific Ocean by USS Coolbaugh or USS Richard M. Rowell (both United States Navy) with the loss of all 94 crew. |
| I-O-47 | Kriegsmarine | The Siebelgefäß landing craft was sunk on this date. |
| Kaiko Maru | Japan | World War II: The cargo ship was bombed and sunk in the South China Sea (20°27′N 111°49′E) by United States Army Air Force aircraft. |
| Karl Meyer | Kriegsmarine | World War II: The seaplane tender was sunk at Rørvik, Norway by aircraft from HMS Implacable (Royal Navy). |
| Kinu | Imperial Japanese Navy | World War II: Battle of Leyte Gulf: Convoy TA No. 2: The Nagara-class cruiser was bombed and sunk in the Sibuyan Sea 44 nautical miles (81 km) south west of Masbate, Philippines by Grumman TBM Avenger and Grumman FM-2 Wildcat aircraft based on USS Manila Bay, USS Marcus Island and USS Natoma Bay (all United States Navy). Most of her 813 crew were rescued by T-6, T-9, and T-10 (all Imperial Japanese Navy). |
| M 433 | Kriegsmarine | World War II: The minesweeper was bombed and sunk by aircraft off Leka, Norway (65°00′N 12°00′E). |
| HMMTB 669 | Royal Navy | World War II: The Fairmile D motor torpedo boat was shelled and sunk by Kriegsmarine surface ships off Norway. (Look 26/10/1943) |
| Noshiro | Imperial Japanese Navy | World War II: Battle off Samar: The Agano-class cruiser was bombed, torpedoed and sunk in the Philippine Sea west of Panay Island, Philippines (11°42′N 121°41′E) by Grumman TBF Avenger aircraft based on USS Cowpens and USS Wasp and Curtiss SB2C Helldiver aircraft based on USS Hornet (all United States Navy) with the loss of 397 of her 726 crew. Three hundred and twenty-eight survivors were rescued by Akishimo and Hamanami (both Imperial Japanese Navy). |
| Nowaki | Imperial Japanese Navy | World War II: Battle of Leyte Gulf: The Kagerō-class destroyer was shelled and damaged in the Pacific Ocean 65 nautical miles (120 km; 75 mi) east south east of Legaspi (13°00′N 124°54′E) by a United States Navy destroyer. She was then torpedoed and sunk by USS Owen (United States Navy). Lost with all crew plus all the survivors of Chikuma (Imperial Japanese Navy) she had rescued the day before. |
| HNoMS Rose | Royal Norwegian Navy | World War II: Convoy ON 260: The Flower-class corvette was accidentally rammed and sunk by HMS Manners (Royal Navy) in the Atlantic Ocean. Three crewmen were killed, with 72 survivors rescued by HMS Highlander (Royal Navy). |
| Rouseville | United States | World War II: The T1 tanker struck a mine in the Seine and caught fire. She was beached at Tancarville, Seine-Inferièure. Rouseville was on a voyage from Rouen to Le Havre. She broke her back and was declared a constructive total loss. |
| Seito Maru or Sito Maru | Imperial Japanese Navy | World War II: The cargo ship struck a mine and sank off Palawan, Philippines, Sumatra, Netherlands East Indies (03°12′S 116°15′E), or Kota Bharu, Malaya, depending on source. |
| Spurven | Norway | World War II: Petsamo–Kirkenes Offensive: The fishing vessel was shelled and sunk at Vardø, Norway by Baku, Gremyashchy, Razumny, and Razyaryonny (all Soviet Navy). |
| T-102 | Imperial Japanese Navy | World War II: Battle of Leyte Gulf: Convoy TA No. 2: The No.101-class landing ship was sunk in the Guimaras Strait by aircraft from USS Hancock (United States Navy) at (11°00′N 123°00′E). |
| Taihaku Maru | Japan | World War II: Convoy MOMA-05: The transport was torpedoed by USS Drum (United States Navy). She broke in half with the forward half sinking in the South China Sea (19°30′N 120°44′E). A total of 1,557 troops and three crewmen were killed; 1,516 troops were rescued, 77 troops and 33 crewmen remain aboard the stern section while it is towed to Luzon and beached in Lompoc Bay. The stern was destroyed by a typhoon on 9 November. |
| Taisho Maru | Japan | World War II: Convoy MOMA-05: The transport was torpedoed and sunk by USS Drum and USS Icefish (both United States Navy) in the South China Sea (19°30′N 120°44′E). A total of 1,557 troops and 45 crewmen were killed. |
| Taiyo Maru | Japan | World War II: Convoy MOMA-05: The transport was torpedoed and sunk by USS Icefish (United States Navy) in the South China Sea (19°30′N 120°44′E). A total of 2,200 troops and 37 crewmen were killed. |
| Takasago Maru No.7 | Japan | World War II: The tanker was torpedoed and sunk in the South China Sea by USS Rock (United States Navy). |
| UJ 2110 Korgialenios | Kriegsmarine | The submarine chaser was lost on this date. |
| Uranami | Imperial Japanese Navy | World War II: Battle of Leyte Gulf: Convoy TA No. 2: The Fubuki-class destroyer was sunk in the Sibuyan Sea 12 nautical miles (22 km) south west of Masbate (11°50′N 123°00′E) by aircraft based on USS Manila Bay, USS Marcus Island, USS Natoma Bay and USS Petrof Bay (all United States Navy) with the loss of 103 of her 197 crew. Survivors were rescued by T-6, T-9, and T-10 (all Imperial Japanese Navy). |
| V 5722 Hornack | Kriegsmarine | World War II: The Vorpostenboot was sunk at Rørvik by Allied aircraft. |

== 27 October ==
List of shipwrecks: 27 October 1944
| Ship | State | Description |
|---|---|---|
| F 1027 | Kriegsmarine | The Type D Marinefahrprahm was sunk on this date. |
| F 1035 | Kriegsmarine | The Type D Marinefahrprahm was sunk on this date. |
| Fujinami | Imperial Japanese Navy | World War II: The Yūgumo-class destroyer was sunk 80 nautical miles (150 km; 92 mi) north of Oloilo, Panay (12°00′N 122°30′E) by aircraft based on USS Essex (United States Navy). Sunk with all hands plus survivors of Chōkai (Imperial Japanese Navy). |
| Itsukushima Maru | Imperial Japanese Navy | World War II: The tank ship was torpedoed and damaged by USS Bergall (United States Navy) in the Balabac Strait west of the Palawan Passage (07°17′N 116°45′E). On 29 October she was bombed and further damaged by a Consolidated PB4Y Liberator aircraft of United States Navy Squadron VPB-115. She sank two nautical miles (3.7 km) west of Pulau Kalampunian, Borneo (05°04′N 119°47′E) on 1 November. Between the submarine attack and the air attack 41 crewmen were killed. Survivors, her captain and 66 crewmen, were rescued by Shigure (Imperial Japanese Navy). |
| MRS 26 | Kriegsmarine | World War II: The minesweeper was sunk in Hopseidet by a Soviet Douglas A-20 Havoc aircraft. |
| Nichiho Maru | Japan | World War II: The tanker was torpedoed and sunk in the South China Sea north west of Borneo by USS Bergall (United States Navy). |
| Nippo Maru | Imperial Japanese Navy | World War II: The oiler (a.k.a. Nichiho Maru) was torpedoed and sunk in the Balabac Strait west of the Palawan Passage (07°17′N 116°45′E) by USS Bergall (United States Navy). |
| Nina | Norway | World War II: The cargo ship (1,488 GRT, 1917) struck a mine and sank in the Kattegat (56°12′N 11°20′E). |
| Shiranuhi | Imperial Japanese Navy | World War II: The Kagerō-class destroyer was sunk by aircraft from Task Force 77 80 miles north of Oloilo, Panay (12°00′N 122°30′E). Sunk with all hands. |
| Sumatra Maru | Japan | World War II: The coaster was torpedoed and sunk at Phuket, Thailand by HMS Trenchant (Royal Navy). |
| T-138 | Imperial Japanese Navy | World War II: The No. 103-class landing ship was torpedoed and sunk 30 miles (48 km) north north west of Iwo Jima (25°22′N 141°31′E) by USS Kingfish (United States Navy). Survivors were rescued by CH-47 (Imperial Japanese Navy). |
| T-152 | Soviet Navy | World War II: The minesweeper struck a mine and sank in the Baltic Sea off Reval, Estonia. |
| Tokai Maru No.4 | Japan | World War II: The cargo ship was torpedoed and sunk in the Pacific Ocean off Kita, Iwo Jima by USS Kingfish (United States Navy). |
| U-1060 | Kriegsmarine | World War II: The Type VIIF submarine was damaged in the North Sea by a rocket and depth charge attack by Fairey Barracuda and Fairey Firefly aircraft based on HMS Implacable (Royal Navy) and by Consolidated B-24 Liberator aircraft of 311 Squadron, Royal Air Force and Handley Page Halifax aircraft of 502 Squadron, Royal Air Force. She was grounded at Brønnøysund (65°24′N 11°59′E) with the loss of twelve of her 55 crew. |
| V 304 Seehund | Kriegsmarine | World War II: The Mucke-class trawler was damaged by an explosion off Hellisoy. She was towed to Lervik where she was sunk by rockets from British aircraft. |

== 28 October ==
List of shipwrecks: 28 October 1944
| Ship | State | Description |
|---|---|---|
| Baiei Maru | Japan | World War II: The tanker struck a Japanese mine and sank off Brunei with the loss of three crew. |
| USS Eversole | United States Navy | World War II: Battle of Leyte Gulf: The John C. Butler-class destroyer escort was torpedoed and sunk in Leyte Gulf, probably by I-45 (Imperial Japanese Navy), with the loss of 76 of her 215 crew. Survivors were rescued by USS Richard S. Bull (United States Navy). |
| I-46 | Imperial Japanese Navy | World War II: The Type J1 submarine was depth charged and sunk in the Philippine Sea by USS Gridley and USS Helm (both United States Navy). |
| I-54 | Imperial Japanese Navy | World War II: The I-54-class submarine was depth charged and sunk in the Philippine Sea by USS Gridley and USS Helm (both United States Navy). |
| Karmøy | Norway | World War II: The cargo ship (2,498 GRT, 1921) was sunk at Lødingen, Norway by aircraft based on HMS Implacable (Royal Navy) with the loss of five crew. The wreck was scrapped in the 1950s. |
| Rigel | Finland | World War II: The cargo ship struck a mine and sank in the Gulf of Finland (59°57′N 24°21′E). All 23 crew were rescued by Herkules (Finland). |
| Sumatra Maru | Japan | World War II: The cargo ship was sunk in Phuket Harbour, Thailand (07°54′N 98°28′E) by Royal Navy frogmen using Chariots. |
| T-101 | Imperial Japanese Navy | World War II: The No.101-class landing ship was bombed and sunk off Ormoc Bay, Philippines (11°03′N 123°05′E) by US carrier aircraft. |

== 29 October ==
List of shipwrecks: 29 October 1944
| Ship | State | Description |
|---|---|---|
| I-45 | Imperial Japanese Navy | World War II: The Type B1 submarine was depth charged and sunk in the Philippine Sea off Dinagat Island, Philippines by USS Whitehurst (United States Navy). |
| Itukusima Maru | Japan | World War II: The cargo ship was sunk in the South China Sea (6°45′N 116°55′E) by United States Navy aircraft. |
| John A. Johnson | United States | World War II: The Liberty ship was torpedoed and sunk in the Pacific Ocean (29°55′N 141°25′E) by I-12 (Imperial Japanese Navy). I-12 fired on the survivors with a machine gun killing four crewmen, a United States Army officer and four gunners. Survivors were rescued by USS Argus (United States Navy) the next day. |
| Kokko Maru | Japan | World War II: The tanker struck a mine and sank at Balikpapan, Netherlands East Indies. |
| PiLB 260 | Kriegsmarine | The PiLB 40 type landing craft was lost on this date. |

== 30 October ==
List of shipwrecks: 30 October 1944
| Ship | State | Description |
|---|---|---|
| Alula | Kriegsmarine | World War II: The auxiliary minesweeper was scuttled at Salonika, Greece. |
| Finland | Germany | World War II: The transport was sunk in the Baltic by Soviet bombers. |
| Gallipoli | Kriegsmarine | World War II: The auxiliary minesweeper was scuttled at Salonika. |
| I-O-06 | Kriegsmarine | The Siebelgefäß landing craft was sunk on this date. |
| I-O-77 | Kriegsmarine | The Siebelgefäß landing craft was sunk on this date. |
| Kosho Maru | Japan | World War II: The tanker struck a mine and sank off Sandakan, Malaya. |
| HMS LCT 936 | Royal Navy | The Mk 4 landing craft tank (350/586 t, 1943) was lost on this date. |
| Nanshin Maru No. 8 | Japan | World War II: The tanker struck a mine and sank off Sandakan. |
| Otranto | Kriegsmarine | World War II: The auxiliary minesweeper was scuttled at Salonika. |
| PiLB 263 | Kriegsmarine | The PiLB 40 type landing craft was lost on this date. |
| R 210 | Kriegsmarine | World War II: The Type R-151 minesweeper was scuttled at Salonika. |
| R 211 | Kriegsmarine | World War II: The minesweeper was scuttled at Salonika. |
| S 54 | Kriegsmarine | World War II: The torpedo boat was scuttled at Salonika. |
| SF 298 | Kriegsmarine | World War II: The Siebel ferry was scuttled at Salonika. |
| Takane Maru | Japan | World War II: The Standard Type 1TL oiler (a.k.a. Karei Maru) was torpedoed and damaged by USS Trigger and USS Salmon (both United States Navy). She was torpedoed and sunk 130 nautical miles (240 km) south west of Toizaki, Kyushu (30°09′N 132°45′E) by USS Sterlet (United States Navy) on 31 October. Sunk with the loss of all 66 crewmen. |
| Zeus | Kriegsmarine | World War II: The auxiliary minelayer was bombed and sunk at Thessaloniki, Greece by Allied aircraft. |

== 31 October ==
List of shipwrecks: 31 October 1944
| Ship | State | Description |
|---|---|---|
| Bremerhaven | Kriegsmarine | World War II: The cargo ship was bombed and sunk in the Baltic Sea north of Gotenhafen (55°03.48′N 18°24.30′E) by Soviet aircraft with the loss of 410 of the 3,171 people on board. |
| GA 77 Alula | Kriegsmarine | The auxiliary minelayer was lost. |
| GA 78 Otranto | Kriegsmarine | The auxiliary minelayer was lost. |
| GA 79 Gallipoli | Kriegsmarine | The auxiliary minelayer was lost. |
| John Banvard | United States | The Liberty ship was driven ashore at Terceira Island, Azores, Portugal. She was declared a constructive total loss and subsequently scrapped. |
| Kaiyō Maru No.6 | Imperial Japanese Navy | World War II: The Kaiyō No.1-class oceanographic research ship was torpedoed and sunk in the Kii Strait by USS Gabilan (United States Navy). |
| Komei Maru | Japan | World War II: Convoy MOMA-05: The cargo ship was torpedoed and sunk in Philippines waters by USS Guitarro (United States Navy). 346 Imperial Japanese Army troops, ten crewmen and three gunners were killed. |
| Netztender 56 | Kriegsmarine | World War II: The net tender, a former RD-class minesweeper, was scuttled at Salonika, Greece. |
| Netztender 57 | Kriegsmarine | World War II: The net tender, a former RD-class minesweeper, was scuttled at Salonika, Greece. |
| Pacific Maru | Imperial Japanese Army | World War II: Convoy MOMA-05: The Daifuku Maru No. 1-auxiliary transport was torpedoed and sunk in the South China Sea north west of Manila, Philippines (15°15′N 119°56′E) by USS Guitaro (United States Navy). 24 troops, 27 gunners, and 23 crewmen were killed. |
| R 185 | Kriegsmarine | World War II: The minesweeper was scuttled at Salonika. |
| R 195 | Kriegsmarine | World War II: The minesweeper was scuttled at Salonika. |
| Taishin Maru | Japan | The cargo ship ran aground between Manila, Luzon and Ormoc Bay, Leyte. |
| Takane Maru | Japan | World War II: The transport was torpedoed and sunk in the South China Sea north west of Manila (15°18′N 119°50′E) by USS Guitaro, USS Salmon and USS Trigger (all United States Navy). A total of 346 troops, three gunners and ten crewmen were killed. |
| SB-2 | Soviet Navy | World War II: The landing craft was torpedoed and sunk in the Baltic Sea off Osmussaar, Estonia by U-958 (Kriegsmarine). |

== Unknown date ==
List of shipwrecks: Unknown date 1944
| Ship | State | Description |
|---|---|---|
| Arbe | Kriegsmarine | World War II: The Malinska-class minesweeper was scuttled at Salonika, Greece. |
| Benjamin Ide Wheeler | United States | World War II: The Liberty ship was sunk at Leyte, Philippines by a Japanese kamikaze aircraft. She was later refloated and used as a depot ship. |
| USS Escolar | United States Navy | World War II: The Gato-class submarine was probably sunk by mine in the Yellow Sea. |
| F 319 | Kriegsmarine | The Siebel ferry foundered sometime in October. |
| F 897 | Kriegsmarine | The Type D Marinefahrprahm was sunk sometime in October. |
| F 898 | Kriegsmarine | The Type D Marinefahrprahm was sunk sometime in October. |
| GA 77 | Kriegsmarine | World War II: The naval trawler was scuttled at Salonika. |
| Hercegnovi | Kriegsmarine | World War II: The coastal cargo ship was sunk by Allied aircraft at Zadar. Raised by her Yugoslav owners, repaired and returned to service in 1948. |
| Hugin | Norway | World War II: The damaged coaster was scuttled at Vadsø sometime in September or October. |
| I-O-15 | Kriegsmarine | The Siebelgefäß landing craft was sunk sometime in October. |
| I-O-34 | Kriegsmarine | The Siebelgefäß landing craft was sunk sometime in October. |
| I-O-46 | Kriegsmarine | The Siebelgefäß landing craft was sunk sometime in October. |
| I-O-65 | Kriegsmarine | The Siebelgefäß landing craft was sunk sometime in October. |
| I-O-114 | Kriegsmarine | The Siebelgefäß landing craft was sunk sometime in October. |
| HMS LCT 377 | Royal Navy | The LCT-3-class landing craft tank (350/625 t, 1942) was lost in the Mediterranean Sea between Marseille, France, and La Maddalena, Italy, sometime in October. |
| HMS LCT 943 | Royal Navy | The LCT-4-class landing craft tank (350/586 t, 1943) was lost in October. |
| Lomen Commercial Co. No. 1 | United States | The 43-gross register ton, 50-foot (15.2 m) scow was wrecked at Cape Darby (64°19′N 162°47′W) on the west-central coast of the Territory of Alaska. |
| MNL 6 | Kriegsmarine | The MNL-1 Type Marinefährprahm was sunk sometime in October. |
| MNL 7 | Kriegsmarine | The MNL-1 Type Marinefährprahm was sunk sometime in October. |
| MNL 8 | Kriegsmarine | The MNL-1 Type Marinefährprahm was sunk sometime in October. |
| MNL 9 | Kriegsmarine | The MNL-1 Type Marinefährprahm was sunk sometime in October. |
| MNL 10 | Kriegsmarine | The MNL-1 Type Marinefährprahm was sunk sometime in October. |
| S-602 | Kriegsmarine | World War II: The S-2-class E-boat was scuttled at Salonika, Greece. |
| S-603 | Kriegsmarine | World War II: The S-2-class E-boat was scuttled at Salonika, Greece. |
| S-604 | Kriegsmarine | World War II: The S-2-class E-boat was scuttled at Salonika, Greece. |
| Santa Maria | Italy | World War II: The cargo ship was scuttled at Venice, Italy. Wreck later scrapped. |
| Solling | Germany | World War II: The fishing trawler struck a mine and sank in the Baltic Sea on or after 22 October. |
| Spalato | Kriegsmarine | World War II:The incomplete Split-class destroyer was scuttled at Split, Yugoslavia. Salvaged post war by Yugoslavia, finished and commissioned. |
| Teno Maru | Imperial Japanese Navy | World War II: The hospital ship was lost through war causes during October. |
| TKA-222 | Soviet Navy | The Vosper 72 foot-class motor torpedo boat was lost in the Barents Sea. |
| U-1226 | Kriegsmarine | The Type IXC/40 submarine was lost on patrol in the Atlantic Ocean south of Iceland on or after 23 October with the loss of all 56 crew. The loss may have been due to a defective snorkel. |
