= Montu (disambiguation) =

Montu was a falcon-headed god of war in Ancient Egyptian religion.

Montu may also refer to:

- Montu (roller coaster), a roller coaster at Busch Gardens Tampa
- Montù, an Italian wine grape
- Mõntu, a village and harbour in Estonia
- Mostafa Mohsin Montu (1945–2025), Bangladeshi politician

== See also ==
- Montù Beccaria, a commune in Italy
