= German submarine U-481 =

German World War II submarine

History

Nazi Germany
- Name: U-481
- Ordered: 5 June 1941
- Builder: Deutsche Werke, Kiel
- Yard number: 316
- Laid down: 6 February 1943
- Launched: 25 September 1943
- Commissioned: 10 November 1943
- Fate: Surrendered on 9 May 1945; Sunk on 30 November 1945

General characteristics
- Class & type: Type VIIC submarine
- Displacement: 769 tonnes (757 long tons) surfaced; 871 t (857 long tons) submerged
- Length: 67.23 m (220 ft 7 in) o/a; 50.50 m (165 ft 8 in) pressure hull
- Beam: 6.20 m (20 ft 4 in) o/a; 4.70 m (15 ft 5 in) pressure hull
- Height: 9.60 m (31 ft 6 in)
- Draught: 4.74 m (15 ft 7 in)
- Installed power: 2,800–3,200 PS (2,100–2,400 kW; 2,800–3,200 bhp) (diesels); 750 PS (550 kW; 740 shp) (electric)
- Propulsion: 2 shafts; 2 × diesel engines; 2 × electric motors.
- Speed: 17.7 knots (32.8 km/h; 20.4 mph) surfaced; 7.6 knots (14.1 km/h; 8.7 mph) submerged
- Range: 8,500 nmi (15,700 km; 9,800 mi) at 10 knots (19 km/h; 12 mph) surfaced; 80 nmi (150 km; 92 mi) at 4 knots (7.4 km/h; 4.6 mph) submerged
- Test depth: 230 m (750 ft); Crush depth: 250–295 m (820–968 ft)
- Complement: 4 officers, 40–56 enlisted
- Armament: 5 × 53.3 cm (21 in) torpedo tubes (four bow, one stern); 14 × torpedoes or 26 TMA mines; 1 × 3.7 cm (1.5 in) Flak M42 AA gun; 2 × twin 2 cm (0.79 in) C/30 anti-aircraft guns

Service record
- Part of: 5th U-boat Flotilla; 10 November 1943 – 31 July 1944; 8th U-boat Flotilla; 1 August 1944 – 8 May 1945
- Identification codes: M 54 658
- Commanders: Oblt.z.S. Ewald Pick; 10 November 1943 – 29 February 1944; Kptlt. Klaus Andersen; 1 March 1944 – 9 May 1945; Oblt.z.S. Gustav Bischoff (acting); 28 December 1944
- Operations: 5 patrols: 1st patrol: 5 July – 4 August 1944; 2nd patrol: 10 – 21 August 1944; 3rd patrol: 16 September – 26 October 1944; 4th patrol: a. 2 November – 22 December 1944; b. 28 December 1944; c. 26 January – 1 February 1945; d. 1 – 3 April 1945; 5th patrol: a. 7 April – 4 May 1945; b. 12 May 1945; c. 15 – 19 May 1945
- Victories: 4 merchant ships sunk (1,165 GRT); 3 warships sunk (160 tons); 1 warship damaged (26 tons)

German submarine U-481 was a Type VIIC U-boat of Nazi Germany's Kriegsmarine during World War II. The submarine was laid down on 6 February 1943 at the Deutsche Werke yard in Kiel, launched on 25 September 1943, and commissioned on 10 November 1943 under the command of Oberleutnant zur See Ewald Pick.

== Design ==
German Type VIIC submarines were preceded by the shorter Type VIIB submarines. U-481 had a displacement of 769 tonnes (757 long tons) when at the surface and 871 tonnes (857 long tons) while submerged. She had a total length of 67.10 m (220 ft 2 in), a pressure hull length of 50.50 m (165 ft 8 in), a beam of 6.20 m (20 ft 4 in), a height of 9.60 m (31 ft 6 in), and a draught of 4.74 m (15 ft 7 in). The submarine was powered by two Germaniawerft F46 four-stroke, six-cylinder supercharged diesel engines producing a total of 2,800 to 3,200 metric horsepower (2,060 to 2,350 kW; 2,760 to 3,160 shp) for use while surfaced, two Siemens-Schuckert GU 343/38–8 double-acting electric motors producing a total of 750 metric horsepower (550 kW; 740 shp) for use while submerged. She had two shafts and two 1.23 m (4 ft) propellers. The boat was capable of operating at depths of up to 230 metres (750 ft).

The submarine had a maximum surface speed of 17.7 knots (32.8 km/h; 20.4 mph) and a maximum submerged speed of 7.6 knots (14.1 km/h; 8.7 mph). When submerged, the boat could operate for 80 nautical miles (150 km; 92 mi) at 4 knots (7.4 km/h; 4.6 mph); when surfaced, she could travel 8,500 nautical miles (15,700 km; 9,800 mi) at 10 knots (19 km/h; 12 mph). U-481 was fitted with five 53.3 cm (21 in) torpedo tubes (four fitted at the bow and one at the stern), fourteen torpedoes, one 3.7 cm (1.5 in) Flak M42 and two twin 2 cm (0.79 in) C/30 anti-aircraft guns. The boat had a complement of between forty-four and sixty.

== Service history ==
=== First patrol ===
U-481 left Kiel on 19 June 1944 under the command of Kapitänleutnant Klaus Andersen, and sailed to Reval (now Tallinn, Estonia) via Helsinki. She departed Reval on her first war patrol on 5 July and sailed east into the Gulf of Finland to Soviet waters. On 30 July she attacked a group of Soviet Navy coastal minesweepers with torpedoes, sinking two (KT-804 and KT-807) and damaging another (KT-806). On the same day the U-boat was attacked while in Narva Bay by two Ilyushin Il-2 Shturmovik aircraft from the 35th Assault Air Regiment (35. ShAP), and managed to damage one enough to force the pilot to ditch his aircraft. The U-boat arrived back at Reval on 4 August.

=== Second patrol ===
U-481 sailed again from Reval on 10 August 1944, and patrolled Soviet waters with no success, before arriving at Königsberg in East Prussia, on 21 August.

=== Third patrol ===
Departing Königsberg on 16 September 1944, the U-boat patrolled the Baltic, and on 15 October sank three small Finnish Galeas sailing barges (Dan, Endla and Maria) off Osmussaar, Estonia, with shell-fire, before arriving at Danzig (now Gdansk) on 26 October.

=== Fourth patrol ===
U-481 sailed from Danzig on 2 November 1944, returning to the Gulf of Finland, and on 9 November off Cape Pakri she torpedoed and shelled the Soviet 1,000 GRT barge 112600, sinking her. On 28 November she sank the Soviet 108 tons coastal minesweeper T-387 in the same area. The U-boat returned to Danzig on 22 December.

=== Fifth patrol ===
After returning to Kiel to be fitted with a 'schnorchel' in February 1945, the U-boat sailed for Horten Naval Base in Norway, making her final patrol along the Norwegian coast from 7 April to 4 May, finally arriving at Narvik only a few days before the German surrender. On 12 May all U-boats in the Narvik area were ordered by the Allies to sail to Skjomenfjord. Later transferred to Loch Ryan, U-481 was sunk at position in 56°11′N 10°00′W as part of "Operation Deadlight" on 30 November 1945.

== Summary of raiding history ==
Date	Ship Name	Nationality	Tonnage (Note: Merchant ship tonnages are in gross register tons. Military vessels are listed by tons displacement.)	Fate
30 July 1944	KT-804	Soviet Navy	26	Sunk
30 July 1944	KT-806	Soviet Navy	26	Damaged
30 July 1944	KT-807	Soviet Navy	26	Sunk
15 October 1944	Dan	Finland	47	Sunk
15 October 1944	Endla	Finland	68	Sunk
15 October 1944	Maria	Finland	50	Sunk
19 November 1944	112600	Soviet Union	1,000	Sunk
28 November 1944	T-387	Soviet Navy	108	Sunk

== Bibliography ==
- Busch, Rainer; Röll, Hans-Joachim (1999). German U-boat commanders of World War II : a biographical dictionary. Translated by Brooks, Geoffrey. London, Annapolis, Md: Greenhill Books, Naval Institute Press. ISBN 1-55750-186-6.
- Busch, Rainer; Röll, Hans-Joachim (1999). Deutsche U-Boot-Verluste von September 1939 bis Mai 1945 [German U-boat losses from September 1939 to May 1945]. Der U-Boot-Krieg (in German). Vol. IV. Hamburg, Berlin, Bonn: Mittler. ISBN 3-8132-0514-2.
- Gröner, Erich; Jung, Dieter; Maass, Martin (1991). U-boats and Mine Warfare Vessels. German Warships 1815–1945. Vol. 2. Translated by Thomas, Keith; Magowan, Rachel. London: Conway Maritime Press. ISBN 0-85177-593-4.
- U-Boat Fact File, Midland Publishing, Great Britain: 1998.
