= German submarine U-958 =

German World War II submarine

History

Nazi Germany
- Name: U-958
- Ordered: 10 April 1941
- Builder: Blohm & Voss, Hamburg
- Yard number: 158
- Laid down: 10 March 1942
- Launched: 21 November 1942
- Commissioned: 14 January 1943
- Fate: Scuttled on 3 May 1945

General characteristics
- Class & type: Type VIIC submarine
- Displacement: 769 tonnes (757 long tons) surfaced; 871 t (857 long tons) submerged
- Length: 67.10 m (220 ft 2 in) o/a; 50.50 m (165 ft 8 in) pressure hull
- Beam: 6.20 m (20 ft 4 in) o/a; 4.70 m (15 ft 5 in) pressure hull
- Height: 9.60 m (31 ft 6 in)
- Draught: 4.74 m (15 ft 7 in)
- Installed power: 2,800–3,200 PS (2,100–2,400 kW; 2,800–3,200 bhp) (diesels); 750 PS (550 kW; 740 shp) (electric)
- Propulsion: 2 shafts; 2 × diesel engines; 2 × electric motors
- Speed: 17.7 knots (32.8 km/h; 20.4 mph) surfaced; 7.6 knots (14.1 km/h; 8.7 mph) submerged
- Range: 8,500 nmi (15,700 km; 9,800 mi) at 10 knots (19 km/h; 12 mph) surfaced; 80 nmi (150 km; 92 mi) at 4 knots (7.4 km/h; 4.6 mph) submerged
- Test depth: 230 m (750 ft); Crush depth: 250–295 m (820–968 ft)
- Complement: 4 officers, 40–56 enlisted
- Armament: 5 × 53.3 cm (21 in) torpedo tubes (4 bow, 1 stern); 14 × torpedoes or 26 TMA mines; 1 × 8.8 cm (3.46 in) deck gun (220 rounds); 1 × twin 2 cm (0.79 in) C/30 anti-aircraft gun

Service record
- Part of: 5th U-boat Flotilla; 14 January 1943 – 31 July 1944; 8th U-boat Flotilla; 1 August 1944 – 15 February 1945; 5th U-boat Flotilla; 16 February – 3 May 1945
- Identification codes: M 50 044
- Commanders: Oblt.z.S. / Kptlt. Gerhard Groth; 14 January 1943 – 25 April 1945; Oblt.z.S. Friedrich Stege; 26 April – 3 May 1945
- Operations: 3 patrols: 1st patrol: a. 3 – 23 June 1944; b. 3 July 1944; c. 27 July – 1 August 1944; d. 3 – 5 August 1944; e. 4 – 5 September 1944; 2nd patrol: 7 September – 11 October 1944; 3rd patrol: a. 13 October – 17 December 1944; b. 23 – 26 March 1945
- Victories: 1 merchant ship sunk (40 GRT); 1 warship sunk (720 tons); 1 merchant ship damaged (40 GRT)

German submarine U-958 was a Type VIIC U-boat of Nazi Germany's Kriegsmarine during World War II. The U-boat was mainly used for training purposes until losses in other theatres prompted her relocation to operate from Norway and then against Soviet shipping in the Northern Baltic Sea.

Built in Hamburg and completed in January 1943, U-958 was given to Oberleutnant zur See Gerhard Groth, who remained with the boat for her whole operational lifespan. Earmarked for training duties in the Baltic, U-958 was based in Kiel and helped prepare other boats for operational service, as well as training up potential commanders and officers and honing tactical and operational techniques. She fulfilled this duty for the whole of 1943, before huge losses in the Battle of the Atlantic forced her to be deployed from Bergen, Norway.

== Design ==
German Type VIIC submarines were preceded by the shorter Type VIIB submarines. U-958 had a displacement of 769 tonnes (757 long tons) when at the surface and 871 tonnes (857 long tons) while submerged. She had a total length of 67.10 m (220 ft 2 in), a pressure hull length of 50.50 m (165 ft 8 in), a beam of 6.20 m (20 ft 4 in), a height of 9.60 m (31 ft 6 in), and a draught of 4.74 m (15 ft 7 in). The submarine was powered by two Germaniawerft F46 four-stroke, six-cylinder supercharged diesel engines producing a total of 2,800 to 3,200 metric horsepower (2,060 to 2,350 kW; 2,760 to 3,160 shp) for use while surfaced, two Brown, Boveri & Cie GG UB 720/8 double-acting electric motors producing a total of 750 metric horsepower (550 kW; 740 shp) for use while submerged. She had two shafts and two 1.23 m (4 ft) propellers. The boat was capable of operating at depths of up to 230 metres (750 ft).

The submarine had a maximum surface speed of 17.7 knots (32.8 km/h; 20.4 mph) and a maximum submerged speed of 7.6 knots (14.1 km/h; 8.7 mph). When submerged, the boat could operate for 80 nautical miles (150 km; 92 mi) at 4 knots (7.4 km/h; 4.6 mph); when surfaced, she could travel 8,500 nautical miles (15,700 km; 9,800 mi) at 10 knots (19 km/h; 12 mph). U-958 was fitted with five 53.3 cm (21 in) torpedo tubes (four fitted at the bow and one at the stern), fourteen torpedoes, one 8.8 cm (3.46 in) SK C/35 naval gun, 220 rounds, and one twin 2 cm (0.79 in) C/30 anti-aircraft gun. The boat had a complement of between forty-four and sixty.

== Service history ==
=== War patrols ===
Just four days after leaving Bergen on her test patrol designed to catch Allied submarines, minelayers and other craft operating off Norwegian waters, U-958 was seen and attacked by Mosquito aircraft of 333 (Norwegian) Squadron of the Royal Air Force. Their rocket and strafing attacks killed one sailor and wounded two more, forcing the boat's early return to Bergen.

A first patrol lasted twenty days amongst the fjords of Norway during June 1944, but without success, failing to find a target. The boat returned to her training duties for a short time, but was still needed in an offensive capacity, and was returned to the Baltic in the summer of 1944.

Her second patrol began on 7 September 1944, and she was tasked with operating in the Northern Baltic along the Finnish coastline. Not only was this area now being used by Soviet naval and civil shipping supplying the war zones in the Baltic states, but it also was used by Finnish vessels. During the patrol the rules of engagement with Finnish shipping changed, as Finland, once an ally of Nazi Germany, had agreed a separate peace with the Soviet Union, and was now fighting German troops on their soil in the Lapland War.

Although this patrol was a failure, soon after her return on the 11 September U-958 was sent back to the same area. This time she was to cover the withdrawal of German forces from Finland, as well as an attempt to exact some revenge on Finnish shipping. This allowed U-958 her only victories, when she torpedoed the two small Finnish coastal sailing craft Linnea and Piikio on the 24 October.

Following this third patrol, U-958 was pulled back to Kiel and did not conduct any more offensive operations, limited by fuel and opportunity.

=== Fate ===
In April 1945, most of her crew were split up and sent to other boats to replace losses, and on the 3 May, the skeleton crew which remained, took her out into Kiel roadstead and scuttled her to prevent her falling into Allied hands. Two years later the wreck was pulled from the seabed and sold for scrap.

== Summary of raiding history ==
Date	Ship Name	Nationality	Tonnage (Note: Merchant ship tonnages are in gross register tons. Military vessels are listed by tons displacement.)	Fate
24 October 1944	Linnea	Finland	40	Sunk
24 October 1944	Piikio	Finland	40	Damaged
29 October 1944	SB-2	Soviet Navy	720	Sunk

== Bibliography ==
- Busch, Rainer; Röll, Hans-Joachim (1999). German U-boat commanders of World War II : a biographical dictionary. Translated by Brooks, Geoffrey. London, Annapolis, Md: Greenhill Books, Naval Institute Press. ISBN 1-55750-186-6.
- Busch, Rainer; Röll, Hans-Joachim (1999). Deutsche U-Boot-Verluste von September 1939 bis Mai 1945 [German U-boat losses from September 1939 to May 1945]. Der U-Boot-Krieg (in German). Vol. IV. Hamburg, Berlin, Bonn: Mittler. ISBN 3-8132-0514-2.
- Gröner, Erich; Jung, Dieter; Maass, Martin (1991). U-boats and Mine Warfare Vessels. German Warships 1815–1945. Vol. 2. Translated by Thomas, Keith; Magowan, Rachel. London: Conway Maritime Press. ISBN 0-85177-593-4.
- Sharpe, Peter (1998). U-Boat Fact File. Great Britain: Midland Publishing. ISBN 1-85780-072-9.
