= HMS Sturdy (P248) =

Submarine of the Royal Navy

Coordinates: 4°34′S 121°27′E

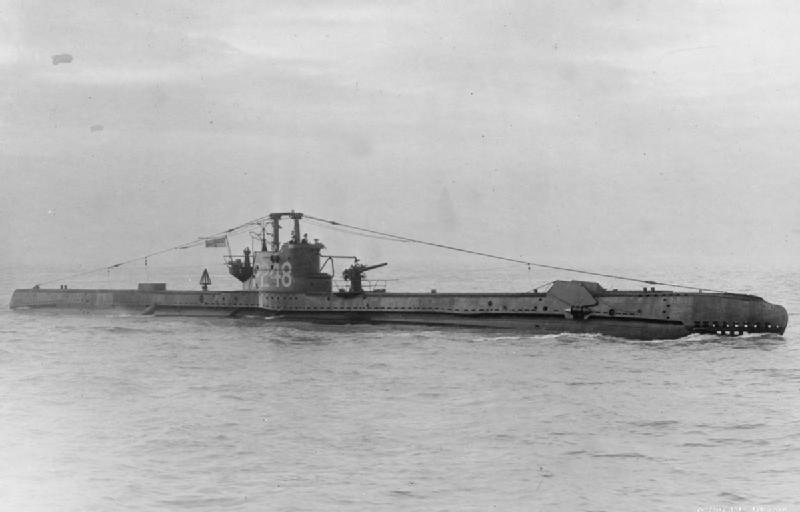
- HMS Sturdy

History

United Kingdom
- Name: HMS Sturdy
- Builder: Cammell Laird & Co Limited, Birkenhead
- Laid down: 22 December 1942
- Launched: 30 September 1943
- Commissioned: 29 December 1943
- Fate: Sold July 1957, broken up 1958
- Badge

General characteristics
- Class & type: S-class submarine
- Displacement: 842 long tons (856 t) surfaced; 990 long tons (1,010 t) submerged
- Length: 217 ft (66.1 m)
- Beam: 23 ft 9 in (7.2 m)
- Draught: 14 ft 8 in (4.5 m)
- Installed power: 1,900 bhp (1,400 kW) (diesel); 1,300 hp (970 kW) (electric)
- Propulsion: 2 × diesel engines; 2 × electric motors
- Speed: 15 knots (28 km/h; 17 mph) surfaced; 10 knots (19 km/h; 12 mph) submerged
- Range: 7,500 nmi (13,900 km; 8,600 mi) at 10 knots (19 km/h; 12 mph) surface; 120 nmi (220 km; 140 mi) at 3 knots (5.6 km/h; 3.5 mph) submerged
- Test depth: 300 feet (91.4 m)
- Complement: 48
- Armament: 7 × 21 in (533 mm) torpedo tubes (6 bow, 1 stern); 1 × 3-inch (76 mm) deck gun

HMS Sturdy was a S-class submarine of the third batch built for the Royal Navy during World War II. She survived the war and was scrapped in 1958.

== Design and description ==
The third batch was slightly enlarged and improved over the preceding second batch of the S-class. The submarines had a length of 217 feet (66.1 m) overall, a beam of 23 feet 9 inches (7.2 m) and a draught of 14 feet 8 inches (4.5 m). They displaced 842 long tons (856 t) on the surface and 990 long tons (1,010 t) submerged. The S-class submarines had a crew of 48 officers and ratings. They had a diving depth of 300 feet (91.4 m).

For surface running, the boats were powered by two 950-brake-horsepower (708 kW) diesel engines, each driving one propeller shaft. When submerged each propeller was driven by a 650-horsepower (485 kW) electric motor. They could reach 15 knots (28 km/h; 17 mph) on the surface and 10 knots (19 km/h; 12 mph) underwater. On the surface, the third batch boats had a range of 7,500 nautical miles (13,900 km; 8,600 mi) at 10 knots (19 km/h; 12 mph) and 120 nmi (220 km; 140 mi) at 3 knots (5.6 km/h; 3.5 mph) submerged.

The boats were armed with seven 21 inch (533 mm) torpedo tubes. A half-dozen of these were in the bow and there was one external tube in the stern. They carried six reload torpedoes for the bow tubes for a grand total of thirteen torpedoes. Twelve mines could be carried in lieu of the internally stowed torpedoes. They were also armed with a 3-inch (76 mm) deck gun.

== Construction and career ==
HMS Sturdy was built by Cammell Laird and launched on 30 September 1943. She survived the Second World War, spending most of it in the Pacific Far East, where she sank eleven Japanese sailing vessels, two Japanese tugboats and three barges, three Japanese fishing vessels, five small unidentified Japanese vessels, a coaster, two small Japanese landing craft, the Japanese communication vessels No.142 and No.128 and the Japanese ships Kosei Maru (99 BRT) and Hansei Maru. She visited Rønne on the Baltic island of Bornholm, Denmark, on 4 July 1956. Sturdy was sold in July 1957. She arrived at the yards of Clayton and Davie on 9 May 1958 for breaking up.
