= SS Juan Casiano =

Mexican tanker lost during a gale in 1944

History
- Name: Linerton (1919-1921); Radix (1921-1939); Tine Asmussen (1939-1940); Juan Casiano (1940-1944)
- Owner: Anglo-Saxon Petroleum Corp. (1921-1929); A/S Mosvolds Rederi (1929-1939); J. Haltermann (1939-1940); Petroleos Mexicanos S. A. (1940-1944)
- Builder: William Doxford & Sons, Sunderland
- Yard number: 539
- Launched: 29 July 1919
- Completed: 26 October 1919
- Maiden voyage: October 1919
- Home port: Newcastle (1919-1921); London (1921-1929); Kristiansand (1929-1931); Farsund (1931-1939); Hamburg (1939-1940); Coatzacoalcos (1941-1944)
- Identification: UK Official Number 142849; Call sign KCRJ (1919–1921); Call sign KJTD (1922–1929); Call sign LJPT (1929–1933); Call sign LCKK (1934–1939); Call sign DKBE (191939–1940); Call sign XCJW (1940–1944)
- Fate: Sank, 19 October 1944

General characteristics
- Type: Tanker
- Tonnage: 6,698 GRT (1919); 4,131 NRT (1919); 6,852 GRT (1921-1929); 3,967 NRT (1921-1929); 6,795 GRT (1930-1940); 4,082 NRT (1930-1940); 7,064 GRT (1941-1944); 5,117 NRT (1941-1944)
- Length: 412 ft 6 in (125.73 m) (1919-1921); 411 ft 8 in (125.48 m) (1921-1929); 412 ft 1 in (125.60 m) (1930-1944)
- Beam: 55 ft 5 in (16.89 m) (1919-1921); 55 ft 7 in (16.94 m) (1921-1929); 55 ft 2 in (16.81 m) (1930-192944
- Depth: 34 ft 4 in (10.46 m) (1919-1921); 34 ft 2 in (10.41 m) (1921-1944)
- Installed power: 619 Nhp
- Propulsion: William Doxford & Sons 3-cylinder triple expansion
- Speed: 10.0 knots (11.5 mph; 18.5 km/h)
- Crew: 21

SS Juan Casiano was a Mexican Tanker that was lost during a gale in the Atlantic Ocean 90 nautical miles (170 km) off Savannah, Georgia, United States on 19 October 1944 while she was travelling from Tampico, Mexico to New York City, New York, United States.

== Construction ==
Juan Casiano was built at the William Doxford & Sons Ltd. shipyard in Sunderland, United Kingdom in October 1919. Where she was launched and completed that same year. The ship was 131.1 metres (430 ft 1 in) long, had a beam of 16.9 metres (55 ft 5 in) and had a depth of 10.4 metres (34 ft 1 in). She was assessed at 7,064 GRT and had 1 x 3 cyl. triple expansion engine. The ship could generate 619 n.h.p. with a speed of 10 knots.

== Pre-War Career and 1919 Incident ==
Only one month after being built, Juan Casiano (then named Linerton) had an engine breakdown as she was travelling from the River Tyne to Baltimore, Maryland, United States on 9 November 1919. This resulted in her running aground near South Shields with no reported fatalities and she ultimately broke in two pieces. The bow was refloated on 6 April 1920 and the stern on 18 May 1920 after which both parts were towed to Rotterdam, The Netherlands to be converted into a tanker under a new owner and under the new name Radix.

She changed hands once more before being sold to a new German owner Johann Haltermann in July 1939 which was accompanied by another name change Tine Asmussen. When World War II broke out a few months later, the newly acquired ship had the possibility of becoming targeted by Allied forces. This never became the case as she was seized by Mexico in 1940 and renamed Juan Casiano to serve under her new owner Petroleos Mexicanos S. A. (Mexican Government) for the upcoming four years.

== Sinking ==
Juan Casiano was travelling from Tampico, Mexico to New York City, New York, United States when on 19 October 1944, she became trapped in a gale in the Atlantic Ocean. The rough weather ultimately became too much for Juan Casiano and she sank 90 nautical miles (170 km) off Savannah, Georgia, United States with the loss of all 21 crew.

== Wreck ==
The wreck of Juan Casiano lies at (32°17′N 77°45′W).
