= Mõntu =

Village in Estonia

Coordinates: 57°57′04″N 22°07′30″E

- Village and harbour
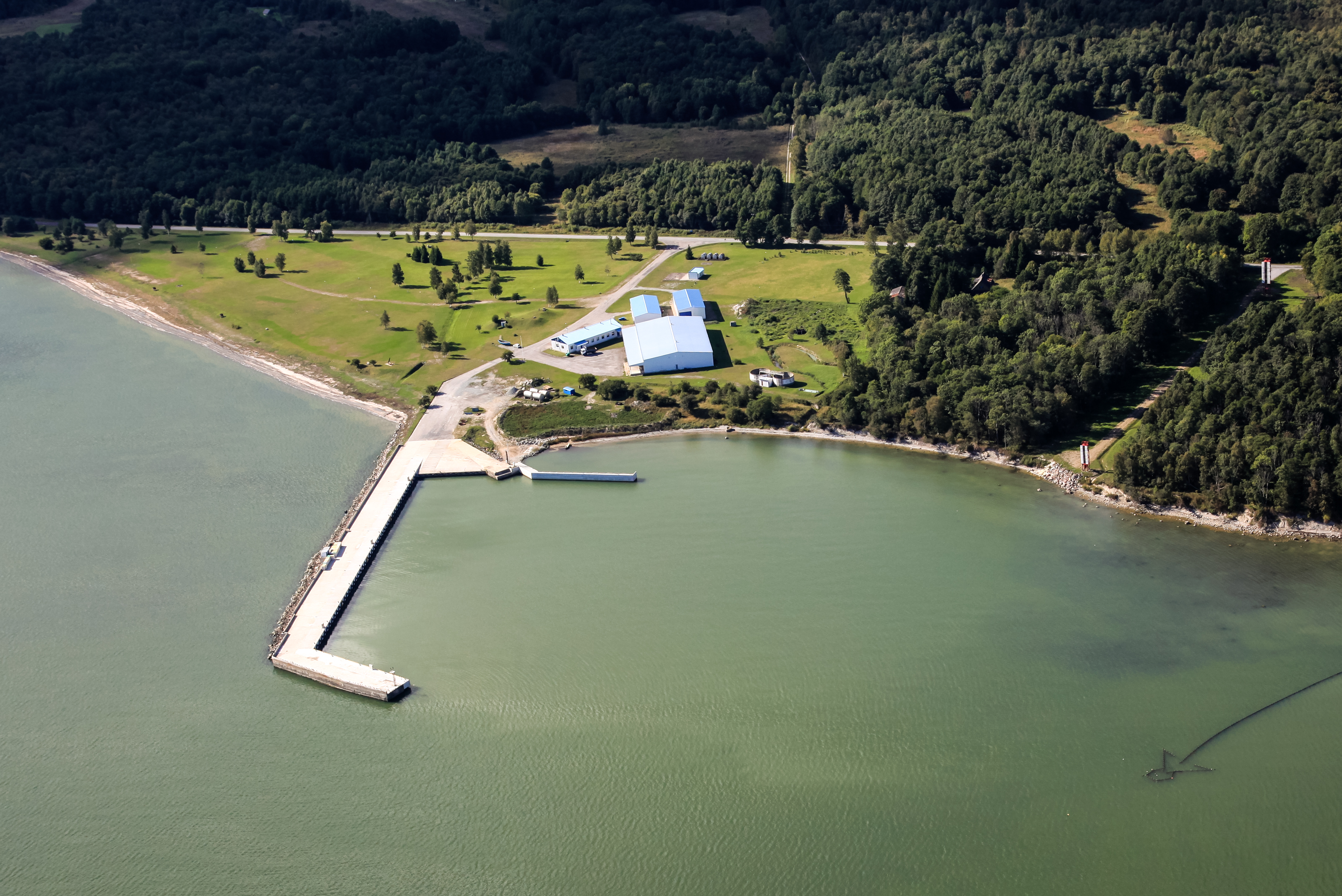
- Mõntu harbour
- Interactive map of Mõntu
- Country: Estonia
- County: Saare County
- Parish: Saaremaa Parish
- Time zone: UTC+2 (EET)
  - Summer (DST): UTC+3 (EEST)

Mõntu is a village in Saaremaa Parish, Saare County in western Estonia. It is located on the southeast coast of Sõrve Peninsula in the southern part of the island of Saaremaa.

From 2005 to 2008, a ferry route operated between Mõntu harbour and the Latvian port of Ventspils. 95 percent of the passengers were tourists.

The largest vessel ever to visit Mõntu harbour was the 130-metre-long Russich-5, which delivered 5,100 tonnes of asphalt chips from Rotterdam in 2009.

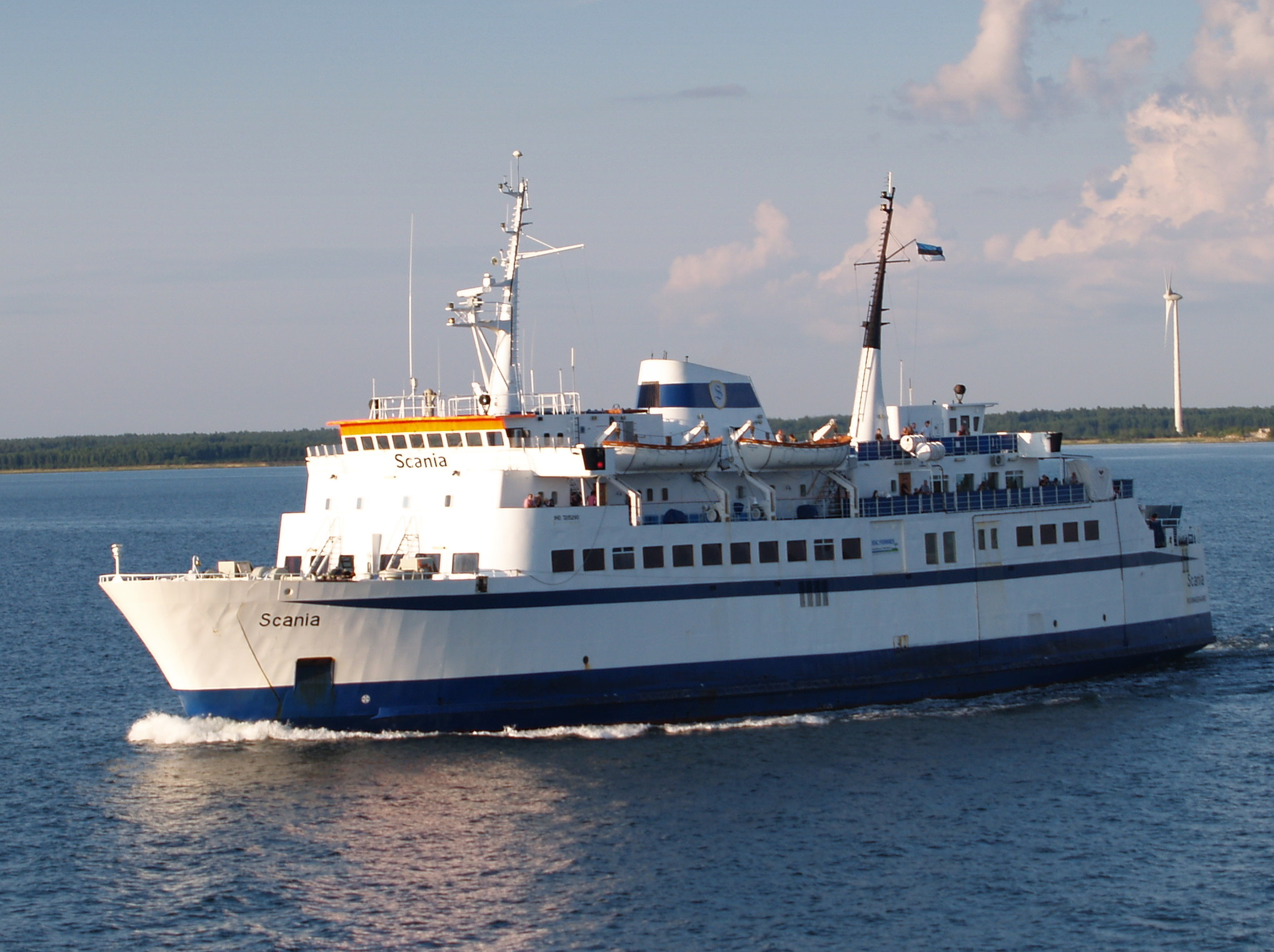
M/S Scania operated between Mõntu harbour and Ventspils from 2005 to 2008
