= List of ship launches in 1927 =

The list of ship launches in 1927 is a chronological list of ships launched in 1927.

Date	Ship	Class/type	Builder	Location	Country	Notes
12 February	Evangeline	Steamship	William Cramp & Sons	Philadelphia	United States	For Eastern Steamship Lines
17 February	Sin Kheng Seng	Coaster	Harland & Wolff	Belfast	United Kingdom	For McKie & Baxter Ltd.
3 March	Cuyahoga	Active-class patrol boat	American Brown Boveri	Camden, New Jersey	United States	For United States Coast Guard.
17 March	Australia	County-class cruiser	John Brown & Company	Clydebank	United Kingdom	For Royal Australian Navy
17 March	Almazora	Cargo ship	R.Duncan & Co	Port Glasgow	United Kingdom	
26 March	Königsberg	Königsberg-class cruiser (1927)	Reichsmarinewerft	Wilhelmshaven	Germany	For Reichsmarine
31 March	C-1	C-class submarine	SECN	Cartagena	Spain	For Spanish Navy; renamed Isaac Peral 1930
14 April	Paua	Tanker	Harland & Wolff	Belfast	United Kingdom	For Nederland Stoomboot Maatschappij.
16 April	Myōkō	Myōkō-class cruiser	Yokosuka Naval Arsenal	Yokosuka	Japan	For Imperial Japanese Navy
20 April	Cheshire	Passenger ship	Fairfield Shipbuilding and Engineering Company	Govan	United Kingdom	For Bibby Line
April	Nordfriesland	ferry	Schiffswerfte & Maschinenfabrik, vorm. Jansen & Schmilinsky	Hamburg	Germany	For Wyker Dampfschiffs-Reederei Amrum GmbH
April	T.C.I.S.G. No. 1	Barge	Alabama Drydock and Shipbuilding Company	Mobile, Alabama	United States	For Tennessee Coal, Iron and Railroad Company.
April	T.C.I.S.G. No. 2	Barge	Alabama Drydock and Shipbuilding Company	Mobile, Alabama	United States	For Tennessee Coal, Iron and Railroad Company.
April	T.C.I.S.G. No. 3	Barge	Alabama Drydock and Shipbuilding Company	Mobile, Alabama	United States	For Tennessee Coal, Iron and Railroad Company.
April	T.C.I.S.G. No. 4	Barge	Alabama Drydock and Shipbuilding Company	Mobile, Alabama	United States	For Tennessee Coal, Iron and Railroad Company.
5 May	Encina	Lighter	Harland & Wolff	Belfast	United Kingdom	For Argentine Navigation Co.
5 May	Enea	Lighter	Harland & Wolff	Belfast	United Kingdom	For Argentine Navigation Co.
14 May	Cap Arcona	Ocean liner	Blohm + Voss	Hamburg	Germany	For Hamburg Süd
26 May	Icotea	Tanker	Harland & Wolff	Belfast	United Kingdom	For Lago Shipping Co.
26 May	Lagunilla	Tanker	Harland & Wolff	Belfast	United Kingdom	For Lago Shipping Co.
31 May	Canberra	County-class cruiser	John Brown & Company	Clydebank	United Kingdom	For Royal Australian Navy
31 May	La Salina	Tanker	Harland & Wolff	Belfast	United Kingdom	For Lago Shipping Co.
31 May	Minmi	Collier	Harland & Wolff	Belfast	United Kingdom	For J. & A. Brown Ltd.
2 June	Princess Elizabeth	Paddle steamer	Day, Summers and Company	Southampton	United Kingdom	For Southampton Isle of Wight and South of England Royal Mail Steam Packet Company Limited
9 June	D1	Barge	Harland & Wolff	Belfast	United Kingdom	For Elder Dempster.
9 June	D2	Barge	Harland & Wolff	Belfast	United Kingdom	For Elder Dempster.
14 June	Erata	Lighter	Harland & Wolff	Belfast	United Kingdom	For Argentine Navigation Co.
15 June	Dunkwa	Cargo ship	Harland & Wolff	Belfast	United Kingdom	For Elder Dempster.
15 June	Nachi	Myōkō-class cruiser	Kure Naval Arsenal	Kure	Japan	For Imperial Japanese Navy
16 June	Agatha	Tanker	Harland & Wolff	Belfast	United Kingdom	For Nederland Indische Tank Stoomvaart Maatschappij.
16 June	Grantleyhall	Cargo ship	Harland & Wolff	Belfast	United Kingdom	For West Hartlepool Steamship Co.
16 June	Laurentic	Ocean liner	Harland & Wolff	Belfast	United Kingdom	For White Star Line
18 June	John Mahn	Fishing trawler	Reiherstieg Schiffswerfte & Maschinenfabrik	Hamburg	Germany	For private owner
20 June	D3	Barge	Harland & Wolff	Belfast	United Kingdom	For Elder Dempster.
28 June	La Falaise	Yacht	Harland & Wolff	Belfast	United Kingdom	For James Allen.
28 June	San Carlos	Tanker	Harland & Wolff	Belfast	United Kingdom	For Lago Shipping Co.
30 June	Berta	Tanker	Harland & Wolff	Belfast	United Kingdom	For Anglo-Saxon Petroleum Company.
30 June	Erica	lighter	Harland & Wolff	Belfast	United Kingdom	For Argentine Navigation Co.
12 July	Eddystone	Coaster	Harland & Wolff	Belfast	United Kingdom	For Clyde Shipping Co.
12 July	Petroniella	Tanker	Harland & Wolff	Belfast	United Kingdom	For Nederland Stoomboot Maatschappij.
19 July	Lahej	Tug	Harland & Wolff	Belfast	United Kingdom	For Peninsular & Oriental Steam Navigation Company.
20 July	John Oxley	Pilot boat	Bow, McLachlan and Company	Paisley	United Kingdom	For Queensland Government
10 August	Portwey	Tug	Harland & Wolff	Belfast	United Kingdom	For Portland & Weymouth Coaling Co.
11 August	Brigida	Tanker	Harland & Wolff	Belfast	United Kingdom	For Anglo-Saxon Petroleum Company.
20 August	Karlsruhe	Königsberg-class cruiser (1927)	Deutsche Werke	Kiel	Germany	For Reichsmarine
25 August	Dixcove	Cargo ship	Harland & Wolff	Belfast	United Kingdom	For Elder Dempster.
25 August	Monte Cervantes	Passenger ship	Blohm + Voss	Hamburg	Germany	For Hamburg Süd
31 August	Kheti	Cargo ship	Harland & Wolff	Belfast	United Kingdom	For James Moss Ltd.
August	Ernst Kühling	Fishing trawler	Schiffswerft von Henry Koch AG	Lübeck	Germany	For Hochseefischerei Julius Weeting AG
August	Martin Donandt	Fishing trawler	G. Seebeck, AG	Wesermünde	Germany	For Hochseefischerei Bremerhaven
1 September	Oranjestad	Tanker	Harland & Wolff	Belfast	United Kingdom	For Bank Line.
	Sabaneta	Tanker	Harland & Wolff	Belfast	United Kingdom	For Bank Line.
8 September	Palacio	Cargo ship	Harland & Wolff	Belfast	United Kingdom	For MacAndrews & Co.
14 September	London	County-class cruiser	Naval Dockyard	Portsmouth	United Kingdom	For Royal Navy
15 September	King Edgar	Cargo ship	Harland & Wolff	Belfast	United Kingdom	For King Line.
22 September	Paula	Tanker	Harland & Wolff	Belfast	United Kingdom	For Nederland Stoomboot Maatschappij.
28 September	Christiaan Huygens	Ocean liner	Nederlandsche Scheepsbouw Maatschappij	Amsterdam	Netherlands	For Stoomvaart Maatschappij Nederland
28 September	I-63	Kaidai III-type submarine	Sasebo Naval Arsenal	Sasebo	Japan	For Imperial Japanese Navy
29 September	King Edwin	Cargo ship	Harland & Wolff	Belfast	United Kingdom	For King Line.
29 September	Uganda	Cargo ship	Harland & Wolff	Belfast	United Kingdom	For MacLay & MacIntyre Ltd.
1 October	California	Ocean liner	Newport News Shipbuilding	Newport News, Virginia	United States	For Panama Pacific Line First major liner with a Turbo-electric transmission
3 October	JJ1	Tug	Harland & Wolff	Belfast	United Kingdom	For Lago Shipping Co.
3 October	JJ2	Tug	Harland & Wolff	Belfast	United Kingdom	For Lago Shipping Co.
3 October	JJ3	Tug	Harland & Wolff	Belfast	United Kingdom	For Lago Shipping Co.
3 October	JJ4	Tug	Harland & Wolff	Belfast	United Kingdom	For Lago Shipping Co.
5 October	Zahra	Tanker	Harland & Wolff	Belfast	United Kingdom	For Vacuum Oil Company.
12 October	Iguazu	Passenger ship	Harland & Wolff	Belfast	United Kingdom	For Argentine Navigation Co.
12 October	Pelayo	Cargo ship	Harland & Wolff	Belfast	United Kingdom	For MacAndrews & Co.
19 October	Drotten	passenger ship	Oskarshamns Varv	Oskarshamn	Sweden	For Ångfartygs Ab Gotland
22 October	Devonshire	County-class cruiser	Naval Dockyard	Devonport	United Kingdom	For Royal Navy
27 October	Beaverford	Cargo liner	Barclay Curle	Glasgow	United Kingdom	For Canadian Pacific Steamship Company
27 October	King Egbert	Cargo ship	Harland & Wolff	Belfast	United Kingdom	For King Line.
28 October	Daru	Cargo ship	Harland & Wolff	Belfast	United Kingdom	For Elder Dempster.
10 November	Argonaut	"V-boat" submarine	Portsmouth Naval Shipyard	Kittery, Maine	United States	For United States Navy
10 November	Pacheco	Cargo ship	Harland & Wolff	Belfast	United Kingdom	For MacAndrews & Co.
15 November	Fubuki	Fubuki-class destroyer	Maizuru Naval Arsenal	Maizuru	Japan	For Imperial Japanese Navy
22 November	Duke of Lancaster	Ferry	William Denny and Brothers	Dumbarton	United Kingdom	For London, Midland and Scottish Railway
23 November	Duchess of Atholl	Ocean liner	William Beardmore & Company	Dalmuir	United Kingdom	For Canadian Pacific Steamship Company
24 November	King John	Cargo ship	Harland & Wolff	Belfast	United Kingdom	For King Line.
24 November	Nimoda	Cargo ship	Harland & Wolff	Belfast	United Kingdom	For Hain Steamship Co.
24 November	Pinto	Cargo ship	Harland & Wolff	Belfast	United Kingdom	For MacAndrews & Co.
28 November	Sefwi	Barge	Harland & Wolff	Belfast	United Kingdom	For Elder Dempster.
28 November	Wala	Barge	Harland & Wolff	Belfast	United Kingdom	For Elder Dempster.
29 November	Cabo Espichel	Tug	Harland & Wolff	Belfast	United Kingdom	For McKie & Baxter Ltd.
29 November	Wandrahm	Cargo ship	Stettiner Oderwerke	Stettin	Germany	For H. M. Gehrckens
8 December	Dafila	Cargo ship	Harland & Wolff	Belfast	United Kingdom	For British & Continental Steamship Co.
21 December	Ponzano	Cargo ship	Harland & Wolff	Belfast	United Kingdom	For MacAndrews & Co.
22 December	King Lud	Cargo ship	Harland & Wolff	Belfast	United Kingdom	For King Line.
29 December	Cabo Raso	Tug	Harland & Wolff	Belfast	United Kingdom	For McKie & Baxter Ltd.
31 December	Cabo Sardao	Tug	Harland & Wolff	Belfast	United Kingdom	For McKie & Baxter Ltd.
Date unknown	Adria	Tanker	AG Weser.	Bremen	Germany	For J. T. Essberger.
Date unknown	Apollo	Cargo ship	AG Weser.	Bremen	Germany	For Neptun Line.
Date unknown	Auriguani	Cargo ship			United Kingdom	For Elders & Fyffes Ltd.
Date unknown	Biscaya	Cargo ship	AG Weser.	Bremen	Germany	For J. T. Essberger.
Date unknown	Capri	Cargo ship	Neptun AG.	Rostock	Germany	For R. Sloman Jr.
Date unknown	Ernst Brockelmann	Cargo ship	Neptun AG	Rostock	Germany	For Ehrich Ahrens
Date unknown	Ganter	Cargo ship	G Seebeck AG	Bremerhaven	Germany	For Norddeutscher Lloyd
Date unknown	Laristan	Tanker	Short Bros. Ltd.	Sunderland, County Durham	United Kingdom	For Common Bros. Ltd.
Date unknown	Marquardt Petersen	Cargo ship	Flensburger Schiffbau-Gesellschaft	Flensburg	Germany	For Morquardt Petersen Reederi Geschellschaft GmbH
Date unknown	Mittelmeer	Tanker	AG Weser.	Bremen	Germany	For J. T. Essberger.
Date unknown	Napier Star	Cargo ship	Lithgows Ltd.	Port Glasgow	United Kingdom	For Blue Star Line.
Date unknown	Rockpool	Cargo ship	William Gray & Co. Ltd.	West Hartlepool	United Kingdom	For Sir R. Ropner & Sons.
Date unknown	Rodney Star	Cargo ship	Lithgows Ltd.	Port Glasgow	United Kingdom	For Blue Star Line.
Date unknown	Theresia L M Russ	Cargo ship	Neptun AG	Rostock	Germany	For Ernst Russ
Date unknown	Walter L M Russ	Cargo ship	Neptun AG	Rostock	Germany	For Ernst Russ
Date unknown	Unnamed	Barge	Alabama Drydock and Shipbuilding Company	Mobile, Alabama	United States	For Tennessee Coal, Iron and Railroad Company.
Date unknown	Unnamed	Barge	Alabama Drydock and Shipbuilding Company	Mobile, Alabama	United States	For W. G. Coyle & Co.
