= Weser (disambiguation) =

Weser is a river in Northwestern Germany.

Weser may also refer to:

== Rivers ==
- Kleine Weser and Werdersee, part of the river Weser until 1968
- Weser (Ourthe) (French name Vesdre), a river in Belgium and Germany

== Other uses ==
- AG Weser, a former German shipbuilding company
- Don Weser (born 1937), retired Australian Test cricket match umpire
- French frigate Weser
- HMS Weser
- SS Weser (disambiguation), several ships

== See also ==
- Operation Weserübung, the code name for Germany's assault on Denmark and Norway during the Second World War
- Bouches-du-Weser, a department of the First French Empire in present-day Germany
- Koch-Weser (disambiguation)
- Weser Tower, a multistorey building in Bremen
