= German trawler V 209 Gauleiter Telschow =

German fishing trawler

History
- Name: Gauleiter Telschow
- Namesake: Otto Telschow
- Owner: Hussmann & Hahn (1937–39); Kriegsmarine (1939)
- Port of registry: (Nazi Germany) Cuxhaven, Germany (1937–39); Kriegsmarine (1939)
- Builder: Schiffbau-Gesellschaft Unterweser AG
- Way number: 265
- Launched: 25 September 1937
- Completed: 16 November 1937
- Commissioned: 12 September 1939
- Out of service: 20 November 1939
- Identification: Code Letters DUBE; Fishing boat registration PC 307 (1937–39); Pennant Number V 206 (1939); Pennant Number V 209 (1939)
- Fate: Sunk 20 November 1939

General characteristics
- Tonnage: 428 GRT, 159 NRT
- Length: 49.76 m (163 ft 3 in)
- Beam: 8.10 m (26 ft 7 in)
- Depth: 3.73 m (12 ft 3 in)
- Installed power: Triple expansion steam engine, 96 nhp
- Propulsion: Single screw propeller

Gauleiter Telschow was a German fishing trawler that was requisitioned by the Kriegsmarine in the Second World War for use as a Vorpostenboot, serving as V 206 Gauleiter Telschow and V 209 Gauleiter Telschow. She was torpedoed and sunk in the North Sea off Heligoland, Germany by HMS Sturgeon on 20 November 1939.

== Description ==
Gauleiter Telschow was 49.76 metres (163 ft 3 in) long, with a beam of 8.10 metres (26 ft 7 in) and a depth of 3.73 metres (12 ft 3 in). She was assessed at 428 GRT, 159 NRT. The ship was powered by a triple expansion steam engine which had cylinders of 35 centimetres (13 3/4 in), 55 centimetres (21 5/8 in) and 64.6 centimetres (25 7/16 in) diameter by 64.9 centimetres (25 9/16 in) stroke. The engine was built by Deschimag Seebeck, Wesermünde and was rated at 96 nominal horsepower. It drove a single screw propeller via a low-pressure turbine, double reduction gearing and a hydraulic coupling.

== History ==
Gauleiter Telschow was built as yard number 265 by Schiffbau-Gesellschaft Unterweser AG, Wesermünde, Germany. She was launched on 25 September 1937 and completed on 17 December. She was built for Hussmann & Hahn, Cuxhaven. The Code Letters DUBE were allocated, as was the fishing boat registration PC 307.

On 12 September 1939, she was requisitioned by the Kriegsmarine and commissioned with 2 Vorpostenflotille as the Vorpostenboot V 206 Gauleiter Telschow. On 20 October, she was redesignated V 209 Gauleiter Telschow. On 20 November 1939, Gauleiter Telschow was on patrol with V 210 R. Walther Darré when they were sighted by HMS Sturgeon. Gauleiter Telschow was torpedoed and sunk in the North Sea 100 nautical miles (190 km) north west of Heligoland with the loss of 24 crew. She was the first German naval vessel sunk by a British submarine during the Second World War.

== Sources ==
- Gröner, Erich (1993). Die deutschen Kriegsschiffe 1815-1945 (in German). Vol. 8/I: Flußfahrzeuge, Ujäger, Vorpostenboote, Hilfsminensucher, Küstenschutzverbände (Teil 1). Koblenz: Bernard & Graefe. ISBN 3-7637-4807-5.
