= German trawler V 209 Dr. Rudolf Wahrendorff =

German fishing trawler

History
- Name: Dr. Rudolf Wahrendorff
- Namesake: Karl Oskar Rudolf Wahrendorff
- Owner: Grundmann & Gröschel (1928–39); Kriegsmarine (1939–44)
- Port of registry: (Weimar Republic) Wesermünde, Germany (1928–33); (Nazi Germany) Wesermünde, Germany (1933–39); Kriegsmarine (1939–44)
- Builder: Deschimag Seebeckwerft
- Yard number: 476
- Launched: 17 September 1928
- Completed: 17 November 1928
- Identification: Code Letters KSBP (1928–34); Code Letters DFAV (1934–39); Fishing boat registration PG 383 (1928–39); Pennant Number V 209 (1939–44)
- Fate: Sunk 24 July 1944

General characteristics
- Class & type: Fishing trawler (1928–39); Vorpostenboot (1939–44)
- Tonnage: 381 GRT, 147 NRT
- Length: 45.31 m (148 ft 8 in)
- Beam: 7.69 m (25 ft 3 in)
- Draught: 4.40 m (14 ft 5 in)
- Depth: 3.56 m (11 ft 8 in)
- Installed power: Triple expansion steam engine, 64nhp
- Propulsion: Single screw propeller
- Speed: 10 knots (19 km/h)

Dr. Rudolf Wahrendorff was a German fishing trawler that was requisitioned in the Second World War by the Kriegsmarine for use as a vorpostenboot, serving as V 209 Dr. Rudolf Wahrendorff. She was bombed and sunk off St. Peter Port, Guernsey, Channel Islands on 24 July 1944.

== Description ==
Dr. Rudolf Wahrendorff was 45.31 metres (148 ft 8 in) long, with a beam of 7.69 metres (25 ft 3 in). She had a depth of 3.56 metres (11 ft 8 in) and a draught of 4.40 metres (14 ft 5 in). She was assessed at 381 GRT, 147 NRT. She was powered by a triple expansion steam engine, which had cylinders of 35 centimetres (13 3/4 in), 55 centimetres (21 5/8 in) and 90 centimetres (35 1/2 in) diameter by 60 centimetres (23 5/8 in) stroke. The engine was made by Deschimag Seebeckwerft, Wesermünde. It was rated at 64nhp. The engine powered a single screw propeller driven via a geared low pressure turbine. It could propel the ship at 10 knots (19 km/h).

== History ==
Dr. Rudolf Wahrendorff was built as yard number 476 by Deschimag Seebeckwerfte, Wesermünde for Grundmann & Gröschel, Wesermünde. She was launched on 17 September 1928 and completed on 17 November. The Code Letters KSBT were allocated, as was the fishing boat registration PG 383. In 1934, her Code Letters were changed to DFAV.

On 23 December 1939, Dr. Rudolf Wahrendorff was requisitioned by the Kriegsmarine for use as a vorpostenboot. She was allocated to 2 Vorpostenflotille as V 209 Dr. Rudolf Wahrendorff. On 4 July 1944 she was damaged in an attack by the motor torpedo boats HMMTB 734, HMMTB 735, HMMTB 743 and HMMTB 748 of the Royal Navy. The minesweeper M 4622 was also damaged. V 208 R. Walther Darré and V 210 Hinrich Hey were sunk in the battle. Dr. Rudolf Wahrendorff was bombed and sunk by Grumman Avenger aircraft of 850 Naval Air Squadron, Fleet Air Arm off Saint Peter Port, Guernsey, Channel Islands (49°27′N 2°32′W) on 24 July 1944. Twenty-six crew were killed.

== Sources ==
- Gröner, Erich (1993). Die deutschen Kriegsschiffe 1815-1945 (in German). Vol. 8/I: Flußfahrzeuge, Ujäger, Vorpostenboote, Hilfsminensucher, Küstenschutzverbände (Teil 1). Koblenz: Bernard & Graefe. ISBN 3-7637-4807-5.
