= German trawler V 210 Hinrich Hey =

German fishing trawler

History
- Name: Hinrich Hey
- Owner: Julius H. Fock & Hans J. M. Pickenpack (1934–39); Kriegsmarine (1939–44)
- Port of registry: (Nazi Germany) Hamburg, Germany (1934–39); Kriegsmarine (1939–44)
- Builder: Norderwerft Köser & Mayer
- Yard number: 681
- Launched: 6 October 1934
- Completed: 8 December 1934
- Commissioned: 24 September 1939
- Out of service: 4 July 1944
- Identification: Code Letters DJNJ; Fishing boat registration HH 214 (1934–39); Pennant Number V 212 (1939); Pennant Number V 210 (1939–44)
- Fate: Torpedoed and sunk

General characteristics
- Type: Fishing trawler (1934–39); Vorpostenboot (1939–44)
- Tonnage: 422 GRT, 156 NRT
- Length: 55.00 metres (180 ft 5 in)
- Beam: 8.17 metres (26 ft 10 in)
- Draught: 4.62 metres (15 ft 2 in)
- Depth: 3.75 metres (12 ft 4 in)
- Installed power: Triple expansion steam engine, 127nhp
- Propulsion: Single screw propeller
- Speed: 12 knots (22 km/h)

Hinrich Hey was a German fishing trawler that was requisitioned by the Kriegsmarine during the Second World War for use as a Vorpostenboot. She was sunk in the English Channel by British motor torpedo boats in July 1944.

== Description ==
Hinrich Hey was 55.00 metres (180 ft 5 in) long, with a beam of 8.17 metres (26 ft 10 in). She had a depth of 4.62 metres (15 ft 2 in) and a draught of 3.74 metres (12 ft 3 in). She was assessed at 422 GRT, 156 NRT. She was powered by a triple expansion steam engine, which had cylinders of 35 centimetres (13 3/4 in), 88 centimetres (34 5/8 in) and 88 centimetres (34 5/8 in) diameter by 65 centimetres (25 5/8 in) stroke. The engine was made by Deschimag Seebeckwerft, Wesermünde. It was rated at 127nhp. The engine powered a single screw propeller driven via a geared low pressure turbine. It could propel the ship at 12 knots (22 km/h).

== History ==
Hinrich Hey was built as yard number 681 by Norderwerft Köser & Mayer, Hamburg for Julius H. Fock and Hans J. M. Pickenpack, Hamburg. She was launched on 6 October 1934 and completed on 8 December. The fishing boat registration HH 214 was allocated, as were the Code Letters DJNJ.

On 24 September 1939, Hinrich Hey was requisitioned by the Kriegsmarine for use as a vorpostenboot. She was allocated to 2 Vorpostenflotille as V 212 Hinrich Hey. She was redesignated V 210 Hinrich Hey on 20 October. On 4 July 1944, she was sunk in the English Channel (48°40′N 2°37′W) by the motor torpedo boats HMMTB 734, HMMTB 735, HMMTB 743 and HMMTB 748 of the Royal Navy. V 208 R. Walther Darré was also sunk in the battle. V 209 Dr. Rudolf Wahrendorff and the minesweeper M 4622 were damaged.

== Sources ==
- Gröner, Erich (1993). Die deutschen Kriegsschiffe 1815-1945 (in German). Vol. 8/I: Flußfahrzeuge, Ujäger, Vorpostenboote, Hilfsminensucher, Küstenschutzverbände (Teil 1). Koblenz: Bernard & Graefe. ISBN 3-7637-4807-5.
