= German trawler V 309 Martin Donandt =

History
- Name: Martin Donandt
- Namesake: Martin Donandt
- Owner: Hochseefischerei Bremerhaven (1927–34); Nordsee Hochseefischerei Bremen-Cuxhaven (1934–39); Kriegsmarine (1939–41)
- Port of registry: (Weimar Republic) Nordenham, Germany (1927–33); Nordenham, Nazi Germany (1933–39); Kriegsmarine (1939–41)
- Builder: G. Seebeck AG
- Yard number: 466
- Launched: August 1927
- Completed: 26 September 1927
- Out of service: 28 October 1941
- Identification: Code Letters QVLR (1927–34); Fishing boat registration BX 195 (1927–29); Fishing boat registration ON 116 (1929–34); Fishing boat registration PG 467 (1934–39); Code Letters DNNT (1934–41); Pennant Number V 308 (1939–41)
- Fate: Struck a mine and sank

General characteristics
- Type: Fishing trawler (1927–39); Vorpostenboot (1939–41)
- Tonnage: 367 GRT, 142 NRT
- Length: 45.31 metres (148 ft 8 in)
- Beam: 7.69 metres (25 ft 3 in)
- Draught: 3.56 metres (11 ft 8 in)
- Depth: 4.40 metres (14 ft 5 in)
- Installed power: Triple expansion steam engine, 63nhp
- Propulsion: Single screw propeller
- Speed: 10 knots (19 km/h)

Martin Donandt was a German fishing trawler that was built in 1927. She was requisitioned by the Kriegsmarine in the Second World War for use as a vorpostenboot. She struck a mine and sank in the Baltic Sea in 1941.

== Description ==
Martin Donandt was 45.31 metres (148 ft 8 in) long, with a beam of 7.69 metres (25 ft 3 in). She had a depth of 3.56 metres (11 ft 8 in) and a draught of 4.40 metres (14 ft 5 in). She was assessed at 367 GRT, 142 NRT. She was powered by a triple expansion steam engine, which had cylinders of 35 centimetres (13 3/4 in), 55 centimetres (21 5/8 in) and 90.0 centimetres (35 7/16 in) diameter by 65 centimetres (25 3/4 in) stroke. The engine was made by G. Seebeck AG, Wesermünde, Germany. It was rated at 63nhp. The engine powered a single screw propeller. It could propel the ship at 10 knots (19 km/h).

== History ==
Martin Donandt was built as yard number 466 by G. Seebeck AG, Wesermünde for the Hochseefischerei Bremerhaven. She was launched in August 1927 and completed on 28 September. The fishing boat registration BX 195 was allocated, as were the Code Letters QVLR. On 7 June 1929, her registration was changed to ON 116. In 1934, her Code Letters were changed to DNNR. On 17 October 1934, she was sold to the Nordsee Deutsche Hochseefischerei Bremen-Cuxhaven. Her registration was changed to PG 467.

On 28 September 1939, Martin Donandt was requisitioned by the Kriegsmarine for use as a vorpostenboot. She was allocated to 3 Vorpostenflotille as V 309 Martin Donandt. On 23 September 1941, she sank the Soviet Navy motor torpedo boat TKA-12 in the Baltic Sea off the Porkkala Lighthouse, Finland. TKA-12 had sunk V 308 Oscar Neynaber with the loss of ten crew. On 28 October 1941, Martin Donandt struck a mine and sank in the Baltic Sea off Liepāja, Latvia with the loss of seven of her crew.

== Sources ==
- Gröner, Erich (1993). Die deutschen Kriegsschiffe 1815-1945 (in German). Vol. 8/I: Flußfahrzeuge, Ujäger, Vorpostenboote, Hilfsminensucher, Küstenschutzverbände (Teil 1). Koblenz: Bernard & Graefe. ISBN 3-7637-4807-5.
