= Delfini =

Delfini may refer to:

- Delfini (family), an Italian noble family
- Delfini (Split band), a Yugoslav rock and pop band from Split
- Delfini (Zagreb band), a Yugoslav rock band from Zagreb
- FV Delfini, a Greek fishing vessel in service 1962–72
