= German trawler V 206 Otto Bröhan =

German trawler turned French ship

History
- Name: Otto Bröhan (1937–45); Ingénieur Hydrographe Nicolas (1945–60)
- Owner: Cranzer Fischdamper AG (1937–39); Kriegsmarine (1939–44); French Navy (1945–60)
- Operator: Cranzer Fischdampfer AG (1937–39); Kriegsmarine (1939–44); French Navy (1949–60)
- Port of registry: (Nazi Germany) Hamburg, Germany (1937–39); Kriegsmarine (1939–44); French Navy (1945–60)
- Builder: H. C. Stülcken Sohn
- Yard number: 723
- Launched: 28 December 1937
- Completed: 8 March 1938
- Commissioned: 6 October 1939 (Kriegsmarine); 1 January 1949 (French Navy)
- Decommissioned: 12 June 1944 (Kriegsmarine); 18 July 1960 (French Navy)
- In service: 8 March 1938
- Out of service: 1944-48
- Identification: Code Letters DJVI (1937–44); Fishing boat registration PC 9 (1938); Fishing boat registration HH 9 (1938–39); Pennant Number V 207 (1939); Pennant Number V 206 (1939–44); Pennant Number P 664 (1949–60)
- Fate: Sold for scrap 1960

General characteristics
- Tonnage: 510 GRT, 189 NRT
- Displacement: 1050t
- Length: 55.65 m (182 ft 7 in)
- Beam: 8.44 m (27 ft 8 in)
- Draught: 4.90 m (16 ft 1 in)
- Depth: 4.21 m (13 ft 10 in)
- Installed power: Triple expansion steam engine, 135nhp, 540ihp
- Propulsion: Single screw propeller
- Speed: 12.5 knots (23.2 km/h)
- Complement: 68 (Ingénieur Hydrographe Nicolas)
- Armament: 1 x 88mm gun, 1 x 20mm cannon (1939–43); 1 x 88mm gun, 5 x 20mm cannon (1943–45); 2 x 20mm cannon (1948–60)

Otto Bröhan was a German fishing trawler that was requisitioned by the Kriegsmarine in the Second World War for use as a Vorpostenboot, serving as V 207 Otto Bröhan and V 206 Otto Bröhan. She was scuttled at Caen, Calvados, France in June 1944. She was raised in March 1945 and converted to a survey ship for the French Navy, renamed Ingénieur Hydrographe Nicolas. She served until 1960 and was then scrapped.

== Description ==
Otto Bröhan was 55.65 metres (182 ft 7 in) long, with a beam of 8.44 metres (27 ft 8 in). She had a depth of 4.21 metres (13 ft 10 in) and a draught of 4.90 metres (16 ft 1 in). She was assessed at 510 GRT, 189 NRT, 1050t displacement. The ship was powered by a triple expansion steam engine, which had cylinders of 35 centimetres (13 3/4 in), 55 centimetres (21 5/8 in) and 88 centimetres (34 5/8 in) diameter by 66 centimetres (26 in) stroke. The engine was made by H. C. Stülcken Sohn, Hamburg, Germany. It was rated at 135nhp and 540ihp. It drove a single screw propeller via a low pressure turbine, double reduction gearing and a hydraulic coupling, and could propel the ship at 12.5 knots (23.2 km/h).

== History ==
Otto Bröhan was built in 1937 as yard number 723 by H. C. Stülcken Sohn, Hamburg, for Cranzer Fischdampfer AG, Hamburg. She was launched on 28 December. The Code Letters DJVI were allocated, as was the Cranz an der Elbe fishing boat registration PC 9. The trawler was named after Otto Bröhan, a fishing boat captain from Hamburg. She entered service on 8 March 1938. On 1 April, her registration was moved to Hamburg as HH9. She fished off Norway and Iceland.

On 6 October 1939, Otto Bröhan was requisitioned by the Kriegsmarine for use as a vorpostenboot. She was commissioned into 2 Vorpostenflotille as V 207 Otto Bröhan. Her armament consisted of one 88 mm anti-aircraft gun at the bow and one 20 mm cannon aft. She was redesignated V 206 Otto Bröhan on 20 October. She served in the North Sea, and following the Fall of France she was based at Saint-Malo, Ille-et-Vilaine, France and Saint Helier, Jersey, Channel Islands. In 1943, Otto Bröhan was rebuilt and her armament was strengthened. She now carried a single 88 mm anti-aircraft gun and five 20 mm cannon. Gunners were provided with armoured shields for protection.

On 6 June 1944, Otto Bröhan was in port at Caen, Calvados, France when Operation Overlord started, and was trapped there with V 212 Friedrich Busse and the motor minesweeper R 231 as their retreat from the port had been cut off. All three vessels were scuttled with explosives on 12 June, with Otto Bröhan scuttled in the Caen Canal. Lieutenant Commander Patrick Dalzel-Job was able to recover documents and equipment from the wreck on 10 July with his team from 30 AU (Assault Unit) Commando.

In March 1945, Otto Bröhan was refloated, given basic repairs at Caen, and laid up in August 1946. She was acquired by the French Navy and, between 1947 and 1948, converted to a hydrographic survey vessel at the naval dockyard at Cherbourg, Manche. She was commissioned on 1 January 1949 as Ingénieur Hydrographe Nicolas, with the Pennant Number P 664. Her armament consisted of two 20 mm cannon. Her complement was 68 men. She was based at Toulon, Var and was used for survey and mapping work of French and North African coasts. Ingénieur Hydrographe Nicolas was withdrawn from service on 18 July 1960. She was sold at Cherbourg that year by the Domaines de l'État, as Q 193, for scrapping.

== Bibliography ==
- Blackman, Raymond V. B., ed. (1953). Jane's Fighting Ships 1953–54. New York: McGraw-Hill.
- Dalzel-Job, Patrick (1991). From Arctic Snow to Dust of Normandy. Leo Cooper. ISBN 0862998425.
- Gröner, Erich (1993). Die deutschen Kriegsschiffe 1815–1945 (in German). Vol. 8/I: Flußfahrzeuge, Ujäger, Vorpostenboote, Hilfsminensucher, Küstenschutzverbände (Teil 1). Koblenz: Bernard & Graefe. ISBN 3-7637-4807-5.
- Paterson, Lawrence (2017). Hitler's Forgotten Flotillas: Kriegsmarine Security Forces. Barnsley, UK: Seaforth Publishing. ISBN 978-1-4738-8239-3.
- Roche, Jean-Michel (2013). Dictionnaire des bâtiments de la flotte de guerre française de Colbert à nos jours [Dictionary of French Warships from Colbert to Today] (in French). Vol. II: 1870–2006 (2nd ed.). France. ISBN 978-2-9525917-3-7. OCLC 165892922.
