= German trawler V 308 Oscar Neynaber =

History
- Name: Oscar Neynaber
- Owner: Kohlenburg & Putz Seefischerei AG (1929–39); Kriegsmarine (1939–41)
- Port of registry: (Weimar Republic) Wesermünde, Germany (1929–33); (Nazi Germany) Wesermünde, Germany (1933–39); Kriegsmarine (1939–41)
- Builder: Schiffsbau Gesellschaft Unterweser AG
- Yard number: 241
- Launched: 30 October 1929
- Completed: 20 November 1929
- Out of service: 23 September 1941
- Identification: Code Letters KRVS (1929–34); Fishing boat registration PG 390 (1929–39); Code Letters DFBC (1934-41)
- Fate: Torpedoed and sunk

General characteristics
- Class & type: Fishing trawler (1929–39); Vorpostenboot (1939–41)
- Tonnage: 314 GRT, 120 NRT
- Length: 47.83 metres (156 ft 11 in)
- Beam: 7.70 metres (25 ft 3 in)
- Draught: 3.46 metres (11 ft 4 in)
- Depth: 4.35 metres (14 ft 3 in)
- Installed power: Compound steam engine, 57 nhp
- Propulsion: Single screw propeller
- Speed: 11 knots (20 km/h)

Oskar Neynaber was a German fishing trawler that was requisitioned in the Second World War by the Kriegsmarine for use as a vorpostenboot, serving as V 308 Oskar Neynaber. She was torpedoed and sunk by Soviet Navy motor torpedo boats on 23 September 1941.

== Description ==
Oscar Neynaber was 47.83 metres (156 ft 11 in) long, with a beam of 7.70 metres (25 ft 3 in). She had a depth of 3.46 metres (11 ft 4 in) and a draught of 4.35 metres (14 ft 3 in). She was assessed at 314 GRT, 120 NRT. She was powered by a 4-cylinder compound steam engine, which had two cylinders each of 30 centimetres (12 in) and 66 centimetres (26 in) diameter by 66 centimetres (26 in) stroke. The engine was made by Christiansen & Meyer, Harburg, Germany. It was rated at 57 nhp. The engine powered a single screw propeller. It could propel the ship at 11 knots (20 km/h).

== History ==
Oscar Neynaber was built as yard number 241 by Schiffsbau Gesellschaft Unterweser AG, Unterweser-Lehe, Germany for the Kohlenbert & Putz Seefischerei AG, Wesermünde. She was launched on 30 October 1929 and completed on 20 November. The fishing boat registration PG 390 was allocated, as were the Code Letters KRVS. In 1934, her code Letters were changed to DFBC.

On 17 September 1939, she was requisitioned by the Kriegsmarine for use as a vorpostenboot, She was allocated to 3 Vorpostenflotille, serving as V 308 Oscar Neynaber. On 23 September 1941, she was torpedoed and sunk by the Soviet Navy motor torpedo boat TKA-12 off the Porkkala Lighthouse, Finland with the loss of ten of her crew.

== Sources ==
- Gröner, Erich (1993). Die deutschen Kriegsschiffe 1815-1945 (in German). Vol. 8/I: Flußfahrzeuge, Ujäger, Vorpostenboote, Hilfsminensucher, Küstenschutzverbände (Teil 1). Koblenz: Bernard & Graefe. ISBN 3-7637-4807-5.
