= German trawler V 412 Bremerhaven =

German fishing trawler

History
- Name: Ernst Kühling (1927-37); Bremerhaven (1937–41)
- Namesake: Bremerhaven
- Owner: Hochseefischerei Julius Weeting AG (1927–34); Nordsee Deutsche Hochsee Fisherei Bremen-Cuxhaven AG (1934–39); Kriegsmarine (1939–40)
- Port of registry: (Weimar Republic) Bremerhaven, Germany (1927–33); (Nazi Germany) Nordenham, Germany (1933–34); (Nazi Germany) Wesermünde, Germany 1934–39); Kriegsmarine (1939–41)
- Builder: Schiffswerft von Henry Koch AG
- Yard number: 270
- Launched: August 1927
- Completed: 24 September 1927
- Commissioned: 23 November 1939
- Out of service: 25 November 1941
- Identification: Code Letters OVLS (1927–34); Fishing boat registration BX 193 (1927–30); Fishing boat registration ON 127 (1930–34); Code Letters DNOK (1934–53); Fishing boat registration PG 468 (1934–39); Pennant Number V 412 (1939–41)
- Fate: Torpedoed and sunk

General characteristics
- Type: Fishing trawler (1927–39); Vorpostenboot (1939–40)
- Tonnage: 371 GRT, 139 NRT
- Length: 50.78 metres (166 ft 7 in)
- Beam: 7.90 metres (25 ft 11 in)
- Draught: 3.57 metres (11 ft 9 in)
- Depth: 4.30 metres (14 ft 1 in)
- Installed power: Triple expansion steam engine, 86nhp
- Propulsion: Single screw propeller
- Speed: 11 knots (20 km/h)

Bremerhaven was a German fishing trawler that was built in 1929 as Ernst Kühling. She was renamed Bremerhaven in 1937. She was requisitioned by the Kriegsmarine during the Second World War for use as a vorpostenboot, serving as V 412 Bremerhaven. She was torpedoed and sunk in November 1941.

== Description ==
The ship was 50.78 metres (166 ft 7 in) long, with a beam of 7.90 metres (25 ft 11 in). She had a depth of 4.30 metres (14 ft 1 in) and a draught of 3.57 metres (11 ft 9 in). She was assessed at 371 GRT, 139 NRT. She was powered by a triple expansion steam engine, which had cylinders of 40 centimetres (15 3/4 in), 64.9 centimetres (25 9/16 in) and 105 centimetres (41 5/16 in) diameter by 68 centimetres (26 3/4 in) stroke. The engine was built by the Ottensener Maschinenbau GmbH, Altona, Germany. It was rated at 86nhp. It drove a single screw propeller, and could propel the ship at 11 knots (20 km/h).

== History ==
Ernst Kühling was built as yard number 270 by the Schiffswerft von Henry Koch, AG, Lübeck, Germany for the Hochseefischerei Julius Weeting AG, Bremerhaven, Germany. She was launched in August 1927 and completed on 24 September. The fishing boat registration BX 193 was allocated, as were the Code Letters OVLS. On 16 June 1930, her registration was changed to ON 128, then to PG 468 on 4 September 1934. On 10 November, she was placed under the management the Nordsee Deutsche Hochsee Fisherei Bremen-Cuxhaven AG. In 1934, her code letters were changed to DNOK.

Ernst Kühling was renamed Bremerhaven in 1937. She was requisitioned by the Kriegsmarine on 23 November 1939 for use as a vorpostenboot. She was allocated to 4 Vorpostenflotille as V 412 Bremerhaven. She was torpedoed and sunk west of Saint-Pol-sur-Mer, Nord, France by the Royal Navy Motor Torpedo Boat HMMTB 45 on 25 November 1941.

== Sources ==
- Gröner, Erich (1993). Die deutschen Kriegsschiffe 1815-1945 (in German). Vol. 8/I: Flußfahrzeuge, Ujäger, Vorpostenboote, Hilfsminensucher, Küstenschutzverbände (Teil 1). Koblenz: Bernard & Graefe. ISBN 3-7637-4807-5.
