= SS Weser =

Ship name

SS Weser can refer to any of three ships originally owned and operated by North German Lloyd:

- SS Weser (1858), built in 1858
- SS Weser (1867), built in 1867
- SS Weser (1922), built in 1922

It can also refer to a Bugsier Reederei und Bergungs ship

- SS Weser (1910), built in 1910

It can also refer to a number of German fishing boats and vorpostenboote

- FV Weser (BX 267), later V 301 Weser
- FV Weser (BX 178), later ON 117, PG 467 and V 304 Breslau
