= German trawler V 1605 Mosel =

German fishing trawler and naval trawler

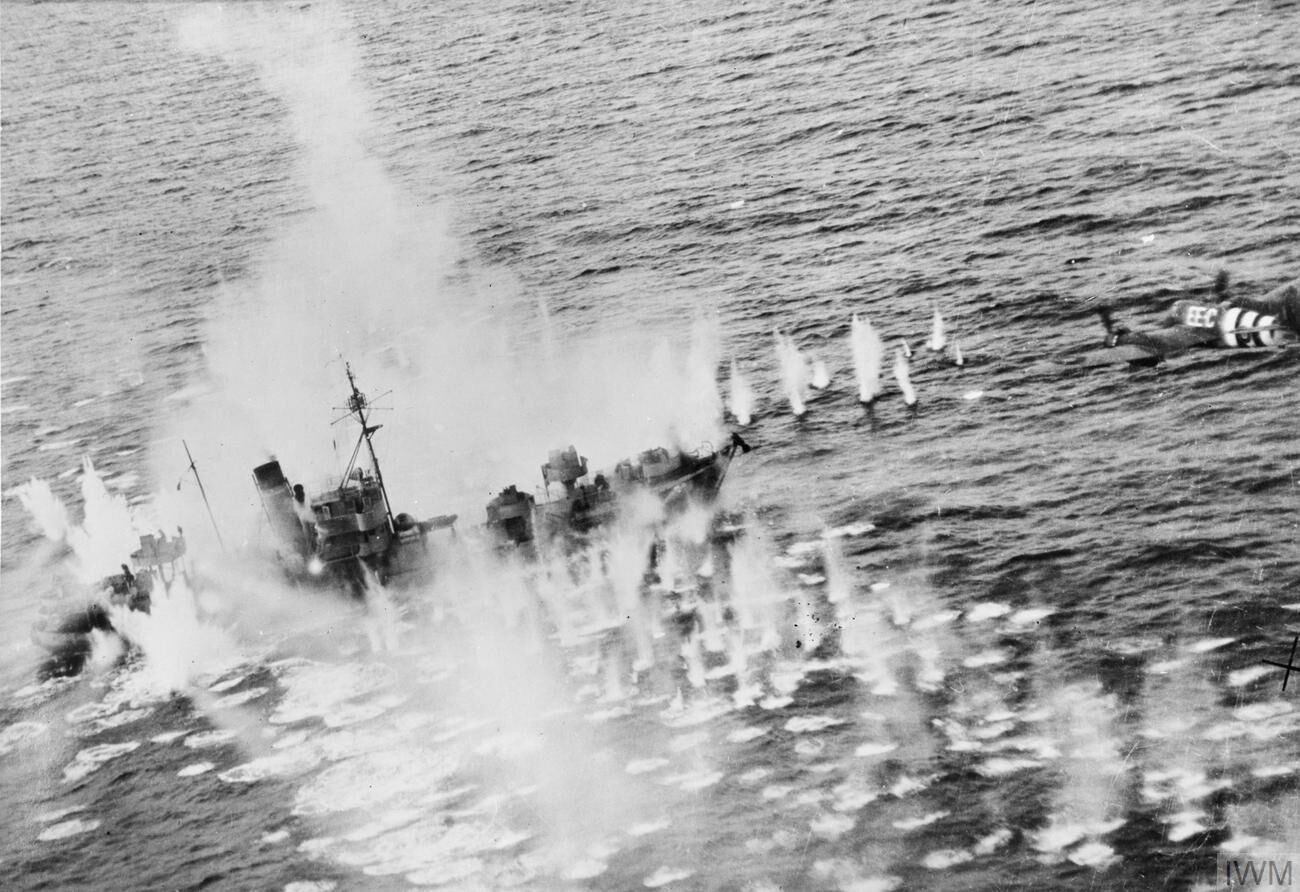
- Mosel under attack by RCAF Beaufighters

History

Germany
- Name: 1937: Mosel; 1939: M-1903; 1944: V-1605
- Namesake: Moselle
- Owner: Hans Kunkel
- Operator: 1939: (Nazi Germany) Kriegsmarine
- Port of registry: 1937: (Nazi Germany) Wesermünde
- Builder: Schiffbau-Gesellschaft "Unterweser", Wesermünde
- Completed: 1937
- Identification: 1937: port letter and number PG 512; call sign DFCY
- Fate: Sunk by air attack, 1944

General characteristics
- Type: fishing trawler
- Tonnage: 426 GRT, 158 NRT
- Length: 163.3 ft (49.8 m)
- Beam: 26.7 ft (8.1 m)
- Depth: 12.3 ft (3.7 m)
- Installed power: 1 × triple-expansion engine; 1 × exhaust steam turbine; 96 NHP
- Propulsion: 1 × shaft; 1 × screw
- Speed: 10 knots (19 km/h)
- Sensors & processing systems: wireless direction finding; echo sounding device

The German trawler V 1605 Mosel was a steam trawler that was built in Germany in 1937 as Hans Loh. In 1939 she was converted into the naval trawler M-1903. In 1943 she became the Vorpostenboot (patrol boat) V-1605. An Allied air attack sank her in the Skagerrak in 1944, killing 21 members of her crew. Her wreck is now a recreational wreck diving site.

== Building and registration ==
In 1937 Schiffbau-Gesellschaft "Unterweser" in Wesermünde, Bremerhaven, built a trawler for the fishing fleet of Hans Kunkel. Mosel was very similar to Main, which "Unterweser" had built for Kunkel in 1936, except that Mosel was about half a metre longer.

Mosel's registered length was 163.3 ft (49.8 m), her beam was 26.7 ft (8.1 m), and her depth was 12.3 ft (3.7 m). Her tonnages were 426 GRT and 158 NRT. She had a cruiser stern, and a single screw. She was equipped with wireless direction finding, and an echo sounding device.

Deutsche Schiff- und Maschinenbau (DeSchiMAG) built her engines in its Seebeck works at Wesermünde. Her main engine was a three-cylinder triple-expansion engine. It was supplemented by an exhaust steam turbine, which drove the same propeller shaft via DeSchiMAG's patent Bauer-Wach system of a Föttinger fluid coupling and double-reduction gearing. The combined power of her reciprocating engine plus exhaust turbine was rated at 96 NHP, and gave her a speed of 10 knots (19 km/h).

Kunkel registered Mosel at Wesermünde. Her port letter and number were PG 512, and her wireless telegraph call sign was DFCY.

== Naval trawler ==
In 1939 the Kriegsmarine requisitioned Mosel, had her converted into a minesweeper, and commissioned her as M-1903. She served in the 19. Minensuchflottille ("19th Mine-hunting Flotilla"), which operated in the Baltic Sea. In April 1940 the flotilla took part in the German invasion of Norway. M-1903 helped to rescue the cruiser Lützow, which was damaged on 9 April in the Battle of Drøbak Sound. M-1903 also rescued the crew of the minesweeper M-1101 Fock & Hubert, which was stranded after hitting a mine on 14 April.

In 1944 the trawler was converted into the patrol boat V-1605. She joined the 16. Vorpostenflottille ("16th Patrol Boat Flotilla"), which was based in German-occupied Denmark. That October she was assigned to escort the 1,202 GRT tanker Inger Johanne from Oslo to Kristiansand. On 15 October, an Allied force of 21 Beaufighters and 17 Mosquitoes from Banff and Dallachy Wings attacked the tanker and her escort. The attack ignited the tanker's cargo of petroleum, and severely damaged V-1605 with 20mm autocannon fire. By the end of the attack, V-1605 was on fire from stem to stern, and sank just minutes after the aircraft disengaged. 21 members of her crew were killed. Inger Johanne was also sunk, and 16 or 17 members of her crew were killed.

== Wreck ==
In 2001 V-1605's wreck was found just off Justøy in southern Norway, at a depth of almost 50 metres (160 ft). The wreck has since become moderately popular with experienced recreational divers.

== Bibliography ==
- Lloyd's Register of Shipping. Vol. II.–Steamers and Motorships of 300 tons: trawlers, tugs, dredgers, &c. London: Lloyd's Register of Shipping. 1938 – via Southampton City Council.
