= HMS Swordfish (61S) =

Submarine

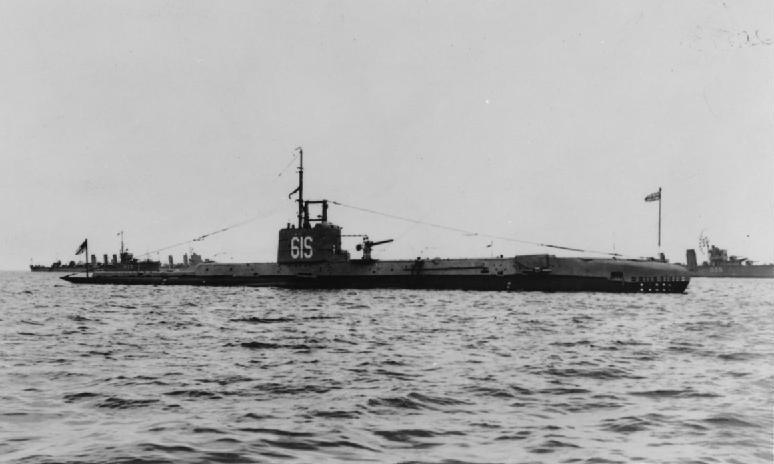
- Swordfish on the surface

History

United Kingdom
- Name: Swordfish
- Ordered: 2 July 1930
- Builder: Chatham Dockyard
- Laid down: 1 December 1930
- Launched: 10 November 1931
- Commissioned: 28 November 1932
- Fate: Sunk by mine, 7 November 1940
- Badge

General characteristics
- Class & type: S-class submarine
- Displacement: 730 long tons (742 t) surfaced; 927 long tons (942 t) submerged
- Length: 202 ft 6 in (61.7 m)
- Beam: 24 ft (7.3 m)
- Draught: 11 ft 11 in (3.6 m)
- Installed power: 1,550 bhp (1,160 kW) (diesel); 1,300 hp (970 kW) (electric)
- Propulsion: 2 × diesel engines; 2 × electric motors
- Speed: 13.75 knots (25.47 km/h; 15.82 mph) surfaced; 10 knots (19 km/h; 12 mph) submerged
- Range: 3,700 nmi (6,900 km; 4,300 mi) at 10 knots (19 km/h; 12 mph) surface; 64 nmi (119 km; 74 mi) at 2 knots (3.7 km/h; 2.3 mph) submerged
- Test depth: 300 feet (91.4 m)
- Complement: 38
- Armament: 6 × bow 21 in (533 mm) torpedo tubes; 1 × 3-inch (76 mm) deck gun

HMS Swordfish (61S) was a first-batch S-class submarine built for the Royal Navy during the 1930s. Commissioned in 1932, she was given the pennant number 61S and was assigned to the 2nd Submarine Flotilla.

At the start of World War II, Swordfish was missed with three torpedoes by her sister ship HMS Sturgeon after being mistaken for a German U-boat. On 20 April 1940, she attacked a German convoy, but her torpedoes failed to hit their targets. Two days later, she sighted another convoy, but did not attack it because of the ships' shallow draught. In the morning of 26 April, she dived to avoid drifting mines; one of them hit but did not explode. During her sixth war patrol, Swordfish was mistakenly bombed by a British aircraft, but sustained no damage. Swordfish disappeared during her twelfth patrol, after departing Portsmouth on 7 November. Although she was initially thought to have been sunk by German destroyers off Brest, she was determined to have been sunk by a mine when her wreck was discovered by diver Martin Woodward in June 1983 off the Isle of Wight. She had left Portsmouth Harbour only hours before, and it is assumed that she was carrying out a trim dive when she struck the German mine.

== Design and description ==
The S-class submarines were designed as successors to the L class and were intended to operate in the North and Baltic Seas. The submarines had a length of 202 feet 6 inches (61.7 m) overall, a beam of 24 feet (7.3 m) and a mean draught of 11 feet 11 inches (3.6 m). They displaced 730 long tons (742 t) on the surface and 927 long tons (942 t) submerged. The S-class submarines had a crew of 38 officers and ratings. They had a diving depth of 300 feet (91.4 m).

For surface running, the boats were powered by two 775-brake-horsepower (578 kW) diesel engines, each driving one propeller shaft. When submerged each propeller was driven by a 650-horsepower (485 kW) electric motor. They could reach 13.75 knots (25.47 km/h; 15.82 mph) on the surface and 10 knots (19 km/h; 12 mph) underwater. On the surface, the first-batch boats had a range of 3,700 nautical miles (6,900 km; 4,300 mi) at 10 knots (19 km/h; 12 mph) and 64 nmi (119 km; 74 mi) at 2 knots (3.7 km/h; 2.3 mph) submerged.

The boats were armed with six 21-inch (533 mm) torpedo tubes in the bow. They carried six reload torpedoes for a grand total of a dozen torpedoes. They were also armed with a 3-inch (76 mm) deck gun.

== Construction and career ==
Swordfish was ordered on 2 July 1930 and was laid down by Chatham Dockyard on 1 December that same year. The submarine was launched on 10 November 1931 and commissioned on 28 November 1932.

At the onset of World War II, Swordfish was a member of the 2nd Submarine Flotilla. From 23 to 26 August 1939 the 2nd Submarine Flotilla moved to their war bases at Dundee and Blyth.

On 1 September, the day the war started, Swordfish departed Dundee for her first war patrol, southwest of Stavanger, Norway. On 14 September, southeast of Aberdeen, Scotland in position 56°22'N, 01°28'W, she was mistaken for a U-boat by her sister ship HMS Sturgeon, which fired three torpedoes. Swordfish dived and the torpedoes missed. On 23 September she left Dundee for her second patrol, west of Denmark. Informed the next day of the attack of HMS Spearfish, she was ordered to stay away from the area and returned to Dundee on 3 October. Between 3 October 1939 and 13 March 1940, she refitted in Dundee, then conducted training exercises. On 22 March, she left port for another patrol, in the western approach to the Skagerrak strait. Swordfish sighted only neutral ships during this patrol and returned to Blyth on 8 April.

Swordfish departed Blyth again on 16 April for another patrol in the Skagerrak. On 20 April, she sighted and attacked a German convoy, made up of Three heavy transports and four escorts in position 58°48′N 10°19′E. Her torpedoes missed, but Swordfish was attacked with depth charges until the evening by the convoy's escorts. Two days later, she sighted another convoy of trawlers and escorts but did not attack them due to their shallow draught, which would have caused the torpedoes to run under the ships. In the morning of 26 April, Swordfish sighted several drifting mines coming towards her; one of these struck as Swordfish was diving, but failed to explode. Swordfish returned to Blyth two days later, ending her fourth patrol.

Swordfish conducted an uneventful patrol from 10 to 25 May in the North Sea. On 5 June, she departed Blyth for her sixth war patrol in the North Sea. The next day, she was bombed in error by a Lockheed Hudson of No. 224 Squadron RAF, but no damage was sustained. After returning to Blyth, Swordfish conducted another patrol, but only aircraft were sighted. On her eighth patrol, she same across the yacht Maski, which was fleeing to the United Kingdom. After taking in the yacht's crew, Swordfish sank it with gunfire. She then conducted a tenth and eleventh patrol, missing several ships with torpedoes.

Nothing was heard from her following her departure from Portsmouth on 7 November 1940 with 40 crew on board to relieve HMS Usk which was on patrol off the Western Approaches near Brest, France. At the time it was thought that she had been sunk by a German destroyer. However she was discovered by a local diver in 1983, split into two just forward of the gun by a mine. The wreck lies in about 46 metres of water roughly 12 miles south of St. Catherine's Point, Isle of Wight in position 50°24′30″N 01°21′00″W. It is likely that she struck the mine shortly after sailing whilst carrying out a trim dive. The wreck site is designated as a protected place under the Protection of Military Remains Act 1986.
