= German trawler V 804 Skolpenbank =

German Vorpostenboot

History

Germany
- Name: Skolpenbank
- Owner: Kriegsmarine
- Builder: Deutsche Schiff- und Maschinenbau
- Launched: 1930
- Commissioned: 1939
- Fate: Lost in the North Sea on 17 October 1939 due to unknown causes

General characteristics
- Tonnage: 381 GRT
- Length: 45.3 metres (148 ft 7 in)
- Beam: 7.7 metres (25 ft 3 in)
- Draught: 4 metres (13 ft 1 in)
- Propulsion: steam

V 804 Skolpenbank was a German fishing trawler which was requisitioned by the Kriegsmarine for service as a Vorpostenboot during World War II.

== History ==
Skolpenbank was built in Bremen by Deutsche Schiff- und Maschinenbau in 1930. It was requisitioned by the Kriegsmarine in 1939.

Skolpenbank was listed as missing on 18 October while patrolling in poor weather near a mined area north of Schiermonnikoog in the North Sea. While the area was checked once the weather was cleared and no deliberately laid mines were found, it is possible the ship was sunk by a "drifter" which had broken loose and floated away due to the poor weather. It is also possible that the Skolpenbank simply succumbed to the bad weather, though this is unlikely because the ship was designed to operate in the North Sea.

The sinking of Skolpenbank and the uncertainty regarding the location and condition of its wreck led the Seekriegsleitung (Maritime Warfare Command) to order that no unnecessary classified information should be carried aboard patrolling vessels, since there was always a possibility that they could be wrecked in shallow water and boarded by enemy forces in search of intelligence.
