= HMS Sturgeon (73S) =

Submarine of the Royal Navy

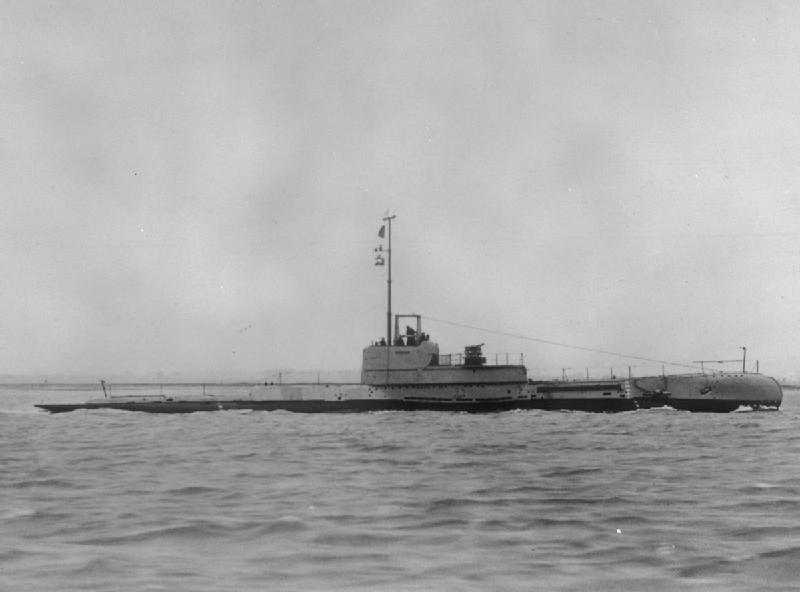
- Sturgeon

History

United Kingdom
- Name: Sturgeon
- Ordered: 2 July 1930
- Builder: Chatham Dockyard
- Laid down: 3 January 1931
- Launched: 8 January 1932
- Commissioned: 27 February 1933
- Recommissioned: 17 November 1945
- Renamed: to Dutch Navy as Zeehond, 11 October 1943
- Identification: Pennant number 73S
- Fate: Broken up January 1946
- Badge

Netherlands
- Name: HNLMS Zeehond
- Commissioned: 11 October 1943
- Decommissioned: 14 September 1945
- Fate: Returned to Royal Navy, 17 November 1945

General characteristics
- Class & type: S-class submarine
- Displacement: 640 tons surfaced; 935 tons submerged
- Length: 202 ft 6 in (61.7 m)
- Beam: 24 ft 0 in (7.3 m)
- Draught: 10 ft 6 in (3.2 m)
- Propulsion: Twin diesel/electric
- Speed: 13.75 knots (25.47 km/h; 15.82 mph) surfaced; 10 knots (19 km/h; 12 mph) submerged
- Complement: 36 officers and ratings
- Armament: 6 × forward 21 in (533 mm) torpedo tubes; 12 torpedoes; 1 × 3 in (76 mm) gun; 1 × 20 mm cannon; 1 × .303-calibre machine gun

HMS Sturgeon was an S-class submarine that entered service with the Royal Navy in 1932. Ordered in 1930, she was laid down at Chatham Dockyard in January 1931 and launched on 8 January 1932. Commissioned on 27 February 1933, Sturgeon was assigned to the 2nd Submarine Flotilla.

At the start of World War II, Sturgeon conducted patrols in the North Sea. On 6 September, she was mistakenly bombed by British aircraft. On her second patrol, she fired three torpedoes at an unidentified submarine, which was in fact her sister ship HMS Swordfish, but the torpedoes missed. On her third patrol, she missed the German U-boat U-23 and was damaged after hitting the bottom, requiring repairs. On 20 November, she sank the German armed trawler V-209 with torpedoes. The sinking was the first successful attack by a British submarine of the war, and was a morale boost for British submariners. During her next patrols in the North Sea, Sturgeon sighted and sank several ships, including the German troop transport Pionier and the Danish merchants SS Sigrun and SS Delfinus. Afterwards, Sturgeon patrolled in the Bay of Biscay, acted as a beacon during Operation Torch, then, after being again damaged by Allied aircraft, escorted the Arctic Convoys PQ 15 and PQ 17. Sturgeon was transferred to the 8th Submarine Flotilla, which operated on the Mediterranean Sea, in October 1942 to support the Allied landings in North Africa. In May 1943, she was loaned to the Royal Netherlands Navy as HNLMS Zeehond. Zeehond was returned to the Royal Navy following the war and was sold for scrap in 1946. She was one of the four submarines that formed the First Group of the S class, and the only one of these to survive the war.

== Design and description ==
The S-class submarines were designed as successors to the L class and were intended to operate in the North and Baltic Seas. The submarines had a length of 202 feet 6 inches (61.7 m) overall, a beam of 24 feet 0 inches (7.3 m) and a mean draught of 11 feet 11 inches (3.6 m). They displaced 730 long tons (740 t) on the surface and 927 long tons (942 t) submerged. The S-class submarines had a crew of 38 officers and ratings. They had a diving depth of 300 feet (91 m).

For surface running, the boats were powered by two 775-brake-horsepower (578 kW) diesel engines, each driving one propeller shaft. When submerged each propeller was driven by a 650-horsepower (485 kW) electric motor. They could reach 13.75 knots (25.47 km/h; 15.82 mph) on the surface and 10 knots (19 km/h; 12 mph) underwater. On the surface, the first-batch boats had a range of 3,700 nautical miles (6,900 km; 4,300 mi) at 10 knots (19 km/h; 12 mph) and 64 nmi (119 km; 74 mi) at 2 knots (3.7 km/h; 2.3 mph) submerged.

The boats were armed with six 21-inch (533 mm) torpedo tubes in the bow. They carried six reload torpedoes for a grand total of a dozen torpedoes. They were also armed with a 3-inch (76 mm) deck gun.

== Construction and career ==
Ordered on 2 July 1930, Sturgeon was laid down by Chatham Dockyard on 3 January 1931. She was launched on 8 January 1932 and commissioned on 15 December 1932.

At the onset of the World War II, Sturgeon was a member of the 2nd Submarine Flotilla. From 23 to 26 August 1939, the 2nd Submarine Flotilla transferred to their war bases at Dundee and Blyth.

=== North Sea patrols ===
On 23 August, Sturgeon departed her homeport of Portland along with her sister ships Spearfish and Swordfish. On 25 August, she commenced patrolling southwest of Stavanger, Norway. When Britain declared war against Nazi Germany on 1 September, this became Sturgeon's first combat patrol. On 4 September 1939, Sturgeon, on her way to return to Dundee, was erroneously bomber by a British aircraft at 16:20 (UTC) in position 56°34′N 01°04′W. At 16:42 the aircraft dropped another bomb but Sturgeon was not damaged, arriving the next day at Dundee.

Sturgeon departed Dundee on 13 September on her second war patrol, in the same are as the first. On 14 September, Sturgeon sighted an unidentified submarine, thought to be a German U-boat, and fired three torpedoes at it in position 56°22′N 01°28′W, south-east of Aberdeen, Scotland. The submarine, which was in fact the British HMS Swordfish, dived and the torpedoes missed. Sturgeon ended her second war patrol in Dundee on 21 September.

On 8 October 1939, Sturgeon left her home port for her third patrol, in the Skagerrak strait. On 14 October, she sighted the German U-boat U-23 northwest of Skagen, Denmark in position 57°49′N 09°59′E. All three torpedoes missed their target. Two days later on 16 October, Sturgeon hit the bottom at 60 feet (18 m) depth, damaging her ASDIC dome. On 21 October, she ended her third patrol at Rosyth.

After repairs, Sturgeon left for her fourth patrol, off Heligoland then west of Denmark. On 20 November, she sank the German armed trawler V 209 Gauleiter Telshow with torpedoes approximately 50 nautical miles (93 km; 58 mi) northwest of Heligoland in position 54°34′N 06°28′E. The sinking of V-209 was the first successful attack on an enemy ship by a British submarine during the Second World War. On 29 November, Sturgeon ended her fourth war patrol at Blyth.

On 13 December 1939, Sturgeon departed Blyth for a patrol are off the British east coast. However, she was recalled two days later. On 17 December, she again departed Blyth for another war patrol, her sixth. She was ordered to patrol the area west of Denmark. On 20 December, Sturgeon was ordered to patrol the Skagerrak strait instead, but she was ordered to return to her original patrol area the next day. Sturgeon returned to Blyth on 30 December.

After an uneventful seventh war patrol in the North Sea, Sturgeon underwent a refit at Wallsend until 14 April 1940. After shifting back to Blyth, she conducted an uneventful eighth patrol southwest of Stavanger, Norway from 30 April to 11 May 1940. From 22 May to 5 June, Sturgeon conducted another uneventful patrol northwest of Terschelling, Netherlands. On 9 June, she was ordered to patrol close to the British east coast because of fears that German warships would conduct a raid there. She was recalled the next day. Starting on 26 June, Sturgeon patrolled off Texel, Netherlands. On 30 June, she hit the 50 feet (15 m) deep bottom, sustaining minor damage. She ended her patrol on 11 July.

On 27 July 1940, Sturgeon departed Blyth for her twelfth war patrol, off Texel, Netherlands. On 4 August, she sighted the German patrol boat V-811, which was being towed by a tug after hitting a mine. Six torpedoes were fired, but all missed their target. V-811's escorts, the German auxiliary anti-aircraft ships FL 21 and FL 24, attacked Sturgeon for 30 minutes, dropping six depth charges. Sturgeon returned to Blyth on 9 August.

Sturgeon departed Blyth again on 27 August, on her thirteenth patrol, in the Skagerrak strait. On 2 September, she torpedoed and sank the German troop transport Pionier 15 nautical miles (28 km; 17 mi) north of Skagen, Denmark in position 57°56′N 10°46′E. On 10 September, Sturgeon sighted the German U-boat U-43 in position 57°14′N 06°04′E and fired six torpedoes at it; the torpedoes missed their target although Sturgeon reported a hit. She returned to Blyth on 13 September at the end of her patrol.

After an uneventful patrol in the western entrance of the Skagerrak strait from 29 September to 14 October, Sturgeon left Blyth for her fifteenth patrol, again close to the Skagerrak strait, on 26 October. On 3 November, she sank the Danish merchant Sigrun in position 58°59′N 10°22′E with torpedoes. The next day, Sturgeon attempted to attack the Norwegian vessel Ulv at 58°41′N 09°21′E, but both torpedoes missed their target. On 6 November, Sturgeon fired two torpedoes at the Norwegian merchant ship Delfinus. One torpedo hit, and Delfinus sank in position 58°34′N 05°37′E. Sturgeon returned to port on 9 November.

From 28 November 1940 23 February 1941, Sturgeon conducted three uneventful patrols off Bergen, Stadlandet, and Lista, Norway. On 11 March, she departed Blyth for her nineteenth war patrol, assigned to various areas off Norway. She missed a merchant ship with two torpedoes on 20 March and returned to port on 27 March. Sturgeon conducted another uneventful patrol from 12 to 30 April.

=== Bay of Biscay and Arctic patrols ===
After conducting exercises off Dartmouth, Sturgeon departed Portsmouth on 22 May for a patrol in the Bay of Biscay. The patrol was uneventful, and she returned to Portsmouth on 10 June. Her next patrol, starting on 24 June, was aborted when Sturgeon developed a crack in her pressure hull, forcing her to go back to port on 25 June.

After repairs, Sturgeon departed Portsmouth on 26 July 1941 for another patrol in the Bay of Biscay, her twenty-third since the beginning of the war. On 11 August, she ended her patrol in Holy Loch, and on the 15th she arrived at Troon for a refit. On 11 December 1941, she shifted back to Holy Loch, then to Scapa Flow on 27–29 December after training exercises.

On 1 January 1942, Sturgeon sailed to Polyarny, northern Russia, arriving ten days later. On 17 January she departed Polyarny for a patrol off Norway, returning to Lerwick on 13 February. From there Sturgeon left for Holy Loch, then to Portsmouth, arriving on 19 March. On 23 March, she departed Portsmouth for her twenty-fifth patrol. She was to act as a beacon for the St Nazaire Raid, known as Operation Chariot. Having successfully completed her mission, Sturgeon ended her patrol in Holy Loch on 3 April.

On 24 April 1942, Sturgeon departed Holy Loch for another patrol mission, in the Norwegian Sea, as an escort of Convoy PQ 15. She was damaged by friendly aircraft on 28 April and returned to Lerwick on 6 May. On 11 May, she shifted to Elderslie for repairs to her main battery. After passing through various British ports, Sturgeon arrived at Lerwick on 14 June. She left port on 25 June to provide protection for Convoy PQ 17, returning on 12 July. On 4 August, Sturgeon was ordered to patrol off Lister, Norway. She sighted the German merchant Boltenhagen off southern Norway at 58°07′N 06°21′E and sank her with torpedoes. Sturgeon ended her patrol in Lerwick on 16 August. On 2 September, she started her twenty-ninth combat patrol, in the Norwegian Sea. The next day, Sturgeon sighted a German submarine in position 62°15′N 01°05′E and attempted to attack it, but the range between the two submarines could not be closed. The submarine was likely the German U-216, sailing towards the Atlantic on her first war patrol. On 6 September, Sturgeon's aft hydroplanes jammed, rendering diving highly unsafe. She set course for Lerwick, arriving there four days later.

=== Mediterranean patrols ===
After repairs at Chatham Dockyard and Scapa Flow, Sturgeon sailed for Gibraltar on 27 October 1942, temporarily assigned to the 8th Submarine Flotilla which operated in the Mediterranean Sea. On 6 November, Sturgeon was mistakenly attacked by Lockheed Hudson aircraft, which dropped three depth charges in position 36°02′N 06°33′W, causing no damage. Sturgeon arrived later that day.

On 10 November 1942, Sturgeon departed Gibraltar for her thirtieth (first in the Mediterranean) patrol, off Toulon, France, then Naples, Italy. Sturgeon ended her patrol at Gibraltar on 2 December. Between 20 and 24 December, she moved to Algiers, then between 12 and 14 January, she shifted to Mers El Kébir. From 16 January 1943 to 15 February, she conducted antisubmarine exercises off Mers El Kébir with various Royal Navy ships, then returned to Algiers on 16 February. Sturgeon then conducted further exercises off Gibraltar until 23 April 1943, when she set sail for Portsmouth, Britain. On 13 May, she shifted to Plymouth for a refit, but before it could be completed, she was loaned to the Royal Netherlands Navy, which renamed her RnMs Zeehond.

=== Service as HNLMS Zeehond ===
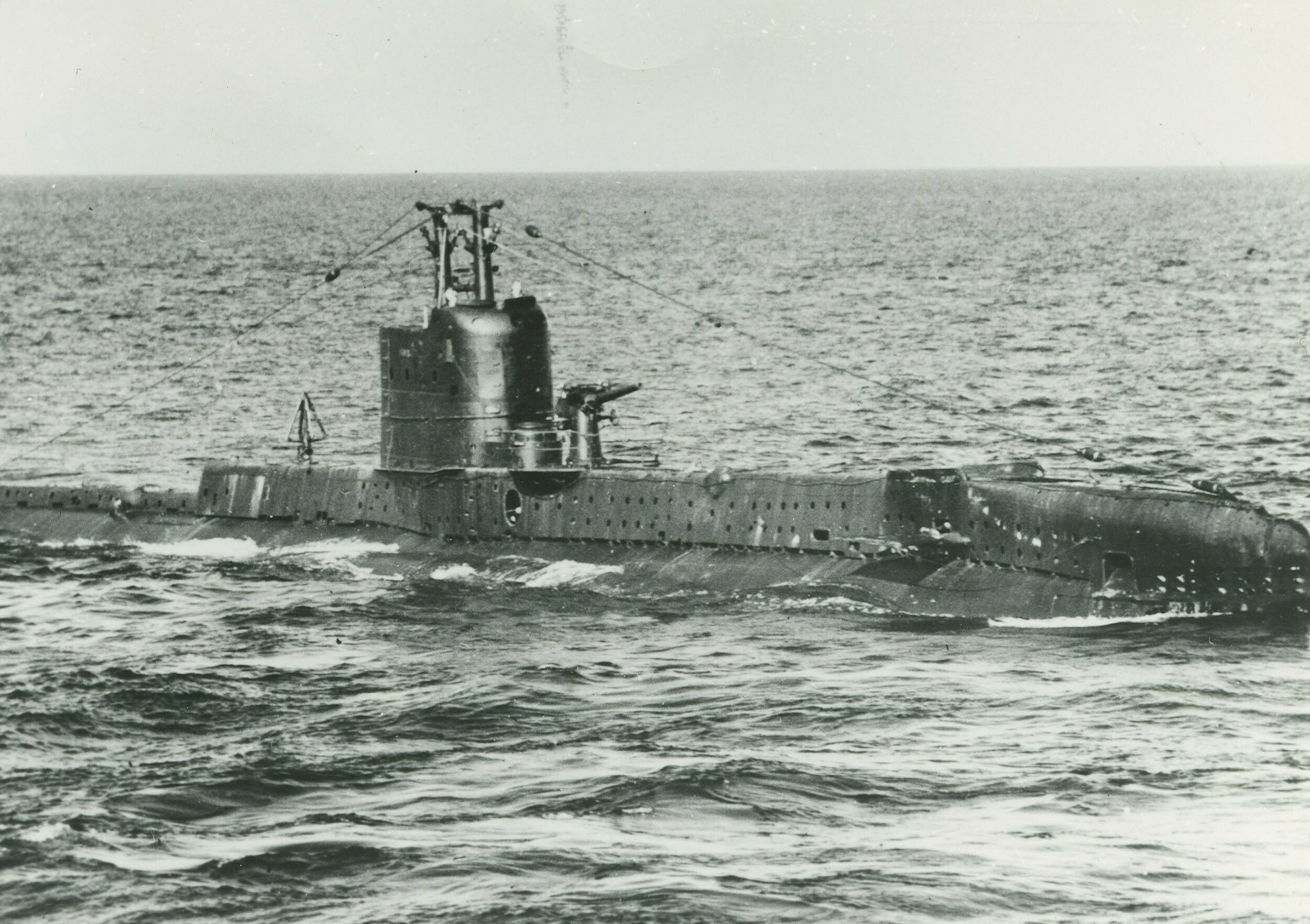
HNLMS Zeehond

Under the command of Donald Theodoor Mackay, Zeehond shifted to Portsmouth, then departed for the River Clyde on 11 November 1943. Between 14 November and 10 December, she conducted training off Rothesay, then in the Clyde area. On 11 December, Zeehond departed Rothesay for St. John's, Newfoundland. However, she encountered heavy seas and used too much fuel for the trip, forcing her to return to Londonderry, Northern Ireland. She then conducted exercises off the River Clyde with HMS Proteus from 1 to 8 February.

After sailing to Lerwick, she left port for the first war patrol. She was ordered to conduct an antisubmarine patrol in the Norwegian Sea. The patrol was uneventful, and Zeehond returned to Lerwick on 26 February. After sailing through various British port cities, Zeehond departed Lerwick on 18 March for her second war patrol, off the Norwegian coast. She was recalled on 21 March and arrived two days later at Lerwick.

From 24 March 1944 to the end of World War II, Zeehond conducted training exercises with several British submarines and ships in various British and Netherlands port cities. She arrived at Dundee on 8 September, where she was returned to the Royal Navy.

HMS Sturgeon was broken up at Granton in January 1946. She was one of four First Group S-class submarines, and the only one of these to survive the war.
