= Koch-Weser =

Koch-Weser may refer to:

- Erich Koch-Weser (1875–1944), German lawyer and liberal politician
- Caio Koch-Weser (born 1944), German economist, civil servant and business executive
- Dieter Koch-Weser (1916-2015), German-American physician, social medicine researcher, Harvard Faculty
