= German trawler V 1302 John Mahn =

German Vorpostenboot

History

Germany
- Name: John Mahn
- Owner: Kriegsmarine
- Builder: Reiherstieg Schiffswerfte & Maschinenfabrik
- Yard number: 580
- Launched: 18 June 1927
- Fate: Sunk in an air raid during Operation Cerberus on 12 February 1942

General characteristics
- Tonnage: 292 GRT; 163 NRT
- Length: 45 m (147 ft 8 in)
- Beam: 7.39 m (24 ft 3 in)
- Draught: 3.32 m (10 ft 11 in)

V 1302 John Mahn was a fishing trawler requisitioned during World War II by the Kriegsmarine for use as a Vorpostenboot. It was launched in 1927 in Hamburg and was sunk in 1942 in the North Sea during Operation Cerberus.

== History ==
John Mahn was built by Reiherstieg Schiffswerfte & Maschinenfabrik in the port of Hamburg. It launched on 18 June 1927 as a fishing trawler with the designation SD 131. It was purchased by the company Ebeling and sailed out of Bremerhaven under the new designation BX 221.

=== Picket boat ===
On 28 September 1939, the Kriegsmarine requisitioned the ship and refitted it for service as a Vorpostenboot. It was given the designation V 1302 and incorporated into the 13th Vorposten-Flottille based out of Rotterdam. In 1942, along with five other ships from the 13th flotilla, the John Mahn took part in Operation Cerberus, a convoy mission of more than 200 ships to escort the heavy cruiser Prinz Eugen and the battleships Scharnhorst and Gneisenau from Brittany through the English Channel to German ports.

Route of Operation Cerberus

The six Vorpostenboote assembled at the Hook of Holland and set out for their outpost position along the route of the convoy early on the morning of 12 February. Because they could not keep pace with the main convoy, the auxiliary ships waited in place for the expected Allied interception. Once in position, John Mahn anchored with V 1303 Freiburg to provide flank cover as the cruisers passed by. By early afternoon, the flotilla was in position and were approached by vessels of the 2nd Minensuch-Flottille. Shortly thereafter, lookouts spotted the main convoy. At 2:43 pm, the convoy passed the flotilla, and at 2:50 pm the anti-aircraft guns of the convoy opened fire. By 3:00 pm, British fighters and bombers were spotted and engaged. At 3:25, four of the other Vorpostenboote raised their anchors and moved closer to John Mahn. As they did so, the group was attacked by two British Lockheed Hudson bombers as well as several Supermarine Spitfire and Hawker Hurricane fighters. They shot down one of the bombers.

At 3:53 pm, John Mahn was surprised by a group of six bombers. It and the nearby Freiburg were able to hit one of the bombers several times, causing it to lose altitude, clip the masthead of John Mahn, and fall into the sea. The John Mahn was then targeted by several other aircraft, being riddled with machine gun fire and struck by two bombs. The first hit the center of the craft, exploding in the boiler room, while the second exploded in the stern tube. The second explosion caused the John Mahn to begin to sink; however, the bow machine gun continued to fire and registered several hits on nearby bombers. The crew was forced to abandon ship shortly thereafter, boarding rafts and dinghies. Twenty-seven crew were rescued by other Vorpostenboote and ships of the 2nd Minensuch-Flottille, while 11 were missing and presumed dead. One sailor died of his wounds on the Minensuchboot M-9 after being rescued.

While several vessels were damaged by mines and British aircraft, including Scharnhorst and Gneisenau, V 1302 John Mahn was the only German ship sunk during the entire Channel Dash.

=== Shipwreck ===
John Mahn lies in the Belgian part of the North Sea, in water as deep as 35 m (115 ft). The wreck is still largely intact, aside from the missing superstructure and a large crack on the port side. There are multiple unexploded depth charges on board which render the wreck hazardous. Samples taken from the wreck and nearby sediment show the presence of heavy metals like nickel and copper and polycyclic aromatic hydrocarbons, which have changed the local microbial ecology and point to the larger problem of shipwreck pollution.
