= German trawler V 301 Weser =

History
- Name: Weser
- Owner: Hanseatische Hochseefischerei AG (1938–39); Kriegsmarine (1939–41); Hanseatische Hochseefischerei AG (1941–62)
- Port of registry: (Nazi Germany) Bremerhaven, Germany (1938–39); Kriegsmarine (1939–41); (Nazi Germany) Bremerhaven (1941–45); Bremerhaven, Allied-occupied Germany (1945–49); Bremerhaven, West Germany (1949–62)
- Builder: Deschimag
- Yard number: 616
- Launched: September 1938
- Completed: 14 October 1938
- Commissioned: 23 September 1939
- Decommissioned: December 1941
- Identification: Code Letters DOUP; Fishing boat registration BX 267 (1938–39); Pennant Number V 301 (1939–41); Fishing boat registration PG 556 (1941–48); Fishing boat registration BX 348 (1948–56)
- Fate: Scrapped

General characteristics
- Type: Fishing trawler (1938–39, 1941–62); Vorpostenboot (1939–41)
- Tonnage: 650 GRT, 245 NRT
- Length: 61.45 m (201 ft 7 in)
- Beam: 8.53 m (28 ft 0 in)
- Draught: 4.44 m (14 ft 7 in)
- Depth: 5.03 m (16 ft 6 in)
- Installed power: Triple expansion steam engine, 132nhp
- Propulsion: Single screw propeller
- Speed: 12.5 knots (23.2 km/h)

Weser was a German fishing trawler that was requisitioned in the Second World War by the Kriegsmarine for use as a vorpostenboot. She was sunk in November 1939 but was raised, repaired and returned to service. She was returned to her owners in 1941 and served until 1962, when she was scrapped.

== Description ==
The ship was 61.45 metres (201 ft 7 in) long, with a beam of 8.53 metres (28 ft 0 in). She had a depth of 5.03 metres (16 ft 6 in) and a draught of 4.44 metres (14 ft 7 in). She was assessed at 321 GRT, 126 NRT. She was powered by a triple expansion steam engine, which had cylinders of 37.9 centimetres (14 15/16 in), 61 centimetres (24 in) and 100 centimetres (39 3/8 in) diameter by 66 centimetres (26 in) stroke. The engine was built by Deschimag Seebeckwerft, Wesermünde, Germany. It was rated at 132nhp. It drove a single screw propeller via a low pressure turbine, double reduction gearing and a hydraulic coupling. It could propel the ship at 10 knots (19 km/h).

== History ==
Weser was built as yard number 616 by Deschimag Seebeckwerft, Wesermünde for the Hanseatische Hochseefischerei AG, Bremerhaven, Germany. She was launched in September 1938 and completed on 14 October. The fishing boat registration BX 267 was allocated, as were the Code Letters DOUP.

On 27 September 1939, Weser was requisitioned by the Kriegsmarine for use as a vorpostenboot. She was allocated to 3 Vorpostenflotille as V 301 Weser. On 25 November, she struck a mine and sank in the Great Belt off Langeland, Denmark with the loss of seventeen lives. She was raised in December 1939, repaired and returned to service.

In December 1941, she was returned to the Hanseatische Hochseefischerei AG, with the registration PG 556. Her registration was changed to BX 348 in December 1948. She was scrapped by Eisen & Metall, Bremerhaven, West Germany in July 1962.

== Sources ==
- Gröner, Erich (1993). Die deutschen Kriegsschiffe 1815-1945 (in German). Vol. 8/I: Flußfahrzeuge, Ujäger, Vorpostenboote, Hilfsminensucher, Küstenschutzverbände (Teil 1). Koblenz: Bernard & Graefe. ISBN 3-7637-4807-5.
