= German trawler V 212 Friedrich Busse =

German outpost boat

History
- Name: Friedrich Busse (1933–45); King Hal (1945–46); Tórhallur (1946–52); Delphin (1952–67); Delfini (1967–72)
- Owner: Hochseefischerei F. Busse (1933–39); Kriegsmarine (1939-44); P/F Trolarafelagid "Tor" (1948–52); Hochseefischerei Cärl Kampf (1952–58)
- Port of registry: (Nazi Germany) Wesermünde, Germany (1933–39); Kriegsmarine (1939–44); United Kingdom (1945–46); Denmark (1946–48); (Denmark) Thorshavn, Faroe Islands (1948–52); Bremerhaven, West Germany (1952–58); Ambelaki, Greece (1958–72)
- Builder: Bremer Vulkan
- Yard number: 710
- Launched: 7 November 1934
- Completed: November 1934
- Commissioned: 16 September 1939
- Out of service: 18 January 1972
- Identification: Code Letters DFCA (1934–39); Fishing boat registration PG 419 (1934–39); Pennant Number V 211 (1939); Pennant Number V 212 (1939–44); Code Letters OXUR (1946–52); Fishing boat registration BX 372 (1952–58); Code Letters DFAL (1952–58)
- Fate: Ran aground and wrecked

General characteristics
- Type: Fishing trawler (1934–39, 1946–72); Vorpostenboot (1939–44); Salvage vessel (1945–46)
- Tonnage: 438 GRT, 166 NRT (1934–45); 507 GRT, 280 NRT (1945–52); 440 GRT, 162 NRT (1952–72)
- Length: 50.53 m (165 ft 9 in)
- Beam: 8.19 m (26 ft 10 in)
- Draught: 4.65 m (15 ft 3 in)
- Depth: 3.83 m (12 ft 7 in)
- Installed power: Triple expansion steam engine, 115nhp (1934–62); Diesel engine, 770ihp (1962–72)
- Propulsion: Single screw propeller

Friedrich Busse was a German fishing trawler that was requisitioned by the Kriegsmarine in the Second World War for use as a Vorpostenboot, serving as V 211 Friedrich Busse and V 212 Friedrich Busse. She was scuttled at Caen, Calvados, France in June 1944.

Friedrich Busse was salvaged in 1945 and used as the British salvage vessel King Hal before returning to service in 1946 as the Danish fishing trawler Tórhallur. She was sold to the Faroe Islands in 1948, then to West Germany in 1952, when she was renamed Delphin. She was sold to Greece in 1958 and was renamed Delfini in 1962. She ran aground and was wrecked at Casablanca, Morocco in 1972.

== Description ==
The ship was 50.53 metres (165 ft 9 in) long, with a beam of 8.19 metres (26 ft 10 in). She had a depth of 3.83 metres (12 ft 7 in) and a draught of 4.65 metres (15 ft 3 in). She was assessed at 438 GRT, 166 NRT. She was powered by a triple expansion steam engine, which had cylinders of 36.0 centimetres (14 3/16 in), 57.0 centimetres (22 7/16 in) and 93 centimetres (36 5/8 in) diameter by 64.9 centimetres (25 9/16 in) stroke. The engine was made by Bremer Vulkan, Vegesack. It was rated at 115nhp. The engine powered a single screw propeller driven via a low pressure turbine, double reduction gearing and a hydraulic coupling. It could propel the ship at 12.5 knots (23.2 km/h).

== History ==
Friedrich Busse was built as yard number 710 by Bremer Vulkan, Vegesack for F. Busse Hochseefischerei, Wesermünde. She was launched on 7 November 1934 and completed that month. The fishing boat registration PG 419 was allocated, as were the Code Letters DFCA.

Friedrich Busse was requisitioned by the Kriegsmarine on 16 September 1939 for use as a Vorpostenboot. She was allocated to 2 Vorpostenflotille as V 211 Friedrich Busse. She was redesignated V 212 Friedrich Busse on 20 October.

On 6 June 1944, Friedrich Busse was in port at Caen, Calvados, France when Operation Overlord started, and was trapped there with V 206 Otto Bröhan and the motor minesweeper R 231 as their retreat from the port had been cut off. All three vessels were scuttled with explosives on 12 June, with Friedrich Busse scuttled in the Caen Canal.

Friedrich Busse was refloated in 1945 and repaired, becoming the salvage vessel King Hal under British ownership. She was sold to Denmark in 1946 and returned to service as the fishing trawler Tórhallur. In 1948, she was sold to P/F Trolarafelagid "Tor", Thorshavn, Faroe Islands. Her port of registry was Thorshaven, sailing under the Danish flag. The Code Letters OXUR were allocated. She was assessed at 507 GRT, 280 NRT. On 18 December 1952, Torhallur was sold to the Hochseefischerei Carl Kämpf, Bremerhaven, West Germany. She was allocated the fishing boat registration BX 372 and the Code Letters DFAL. She was assessed at 440 GRT, 162 NRT. She was sold to Agyris A. Theocharis, Ambelaki, Greece in December 1958 and was renamed Delfini in 1962. She was re-engined in that year; a diesel engine of 770ihp being fitted. On 18 January 1972, she ran aground on the Oukacha Rocks, off Casablanca, Morocco. She was declared a total loss.

== Sources ==
- Gröner, Erich (1993). Die deutschen Kriegsschiffe 1815-1945 (in German). Vol. 8/I: Flußfahrzeuge, Ujäger, Vorpostenboote, Hilfsminensucher, Küstenschutzverbände (Teil 1). Koblenz: Bernard & Graefe. ISBN 3-7637-4807-5.
- Paterson, Lawrence (2017). Hitler's Forgotten Flotillas: Kriegsmarine Security Forces. Barnsley, UK: Seaforth Publishing. ISBN 978-1-4738-8239-3.
