= German trawler V 208 R. Walther Darré =

German fishing trawler

History
- Name: R. Walther Darré
- Namesake: Richard Walther Darré
- Owner: Nordsee Deutsche Hochseefischerei Bremen-Cuxhaven AG. (1933–39); Kriegsmarine (1939–44)
- Port of registry: (Nazi Germany) Wesermünde, Germany (1933–39); Kriegsmarine (1939–44)
- Builder: Deschimag Seebeckwerft
- Yard number: 506
- Launched: July 1933
- Completed: 24 August 1933
- Commissioned: 28 September 1939
- Out of service: 4 July 1944
- Identification: Fishing boat registration HC 273 (1933–39); Code Letters DJMC (1934–44); Pennant Number V 210 (1939); Pennant Number V 208 (1939–44)
- Fate: Sunk in battle

General characteristics
- Type: Fishing trawler (1933–39); Vorpostenboot (1939–44)
- Tonnage: 391 GRT, 151 NRT
- Length: 45.46 m (149 ft 2 in)
- Beam: 7.69 m (25 ft 3 in)
- Draught: 4.65 metres (15 ft 3 in)
- Depth: 3.81 metres (12 ft 6 in)
- Installed power: 115 nhp
- Propulsion: Compound steam engine; Single screw propeller
- Speed: 10 knots (19 km/h; 12 mph)

R. Walther Darré was a German fishing trawler that was requisitioned by the Kriegsmarine in the Second World War for use as a Vorpostenboot. She served as V 210 R. Walther Darré and V 208 R. Walther Darré. She was sunk in the English Channel by British motor torpedo boats in July 1944.

== Description ==
R. Walther Darré was 45.46 metres (149 ft 2 in) long, with a beam of 7.69 metres (25 ft 3 in). She had a depth of 3.81 metres (12 ft 6 in) and a draught of 4.65 metres (15 ft 3 in). She was assessed at 391 GRT, 151 NRT. She was powered by a compound steam engine, which had cylinders of 35 centimetres (13 3/4 in) and 75 centimetres (29 1/2 in) diameter by 64.9 centimetres (25 9/16 in) stroke. The engine was made by Deschimag Seebeckwerft, Wesermünde. It was rated at 115nhp. The engine powered a single screw propeller driven via a geared low pressure turbine. It could propel the ship at 10 knots (19 km/h).

== History ==
The ship was built as yard number 506 by Deschimag Seekbeckwerft, Wesermünde for the Nordsee Deutsche Hochseefischerei Bremen-Cuxhaven AG. She was launched in July 1933 and completed on 23 August. The fishing boat registration HC 273 was allocated. From 1934, she was allocated the Code Letters DJMC. R. Walther Darré took part in the Festungkriegsübung Swinemünde naval exercises on 10 June 1937.

R. Walther Darré was requisitioned by the Kriegsmarine on 28 September 1939 for use as a vorpostenboot. She was allocated to 2 Vorpostenflotille as V 210 R. Walther Darré. On 20 October she was redesignated V 208 R. Walther Darré. On 9 September 1941, she assisted V 202 Hermann Bösch in rescuing the crew of the cargo ship Trifels, which had been torpedoed and sunk off Boulogne, Pas-de-Calais, France by the Motor Torpedo Boat HMMTB 54. On 27 August 1942, she was attacked and sunk by Allied aircraft at Dieppe, Seine-Inférieure, France. She was refloated, repaired and returned to service. On 4 July 1944, she was sunk in the English Channel (48°40′N 2°37′W) by the motor torpedo boats HMMTB 734, HMMTB 735, HMMTB 743 and HMMTB 748 of the Royal Navy. V 210 Hinrich Hey was also sunk in the battle. V 209 Dr. Rudolf Wahrendorff and the minesweeper M 4622 were damaged.

== Sources ==
- Gröner, Erich (1993). Die deutschen Kriegsschiffe 1815-1945 (in German). Vol. 8/I: Flußfahrzeuge, Ujäger, Vorpostenboote, Hilfsminensucher, Küstenschutzverbände (Teil 1). Koblenz: Bernard & Graefe. ISBN 3-7637-4807-5.
