= Vorpostenboot =

Class of German patrol boat in two World Wars

Vorpostenboot (plural Vorpostenboote), also referred to as VP-Boats, flakships or outpost boats, were German patrol boats which served during both World Wars. They were used around coastal areas and in coastal operations, and were tasked with – among other things – coastal patrol, ship escort, and naval combat.

== Characteristics ==
=== Armament ===
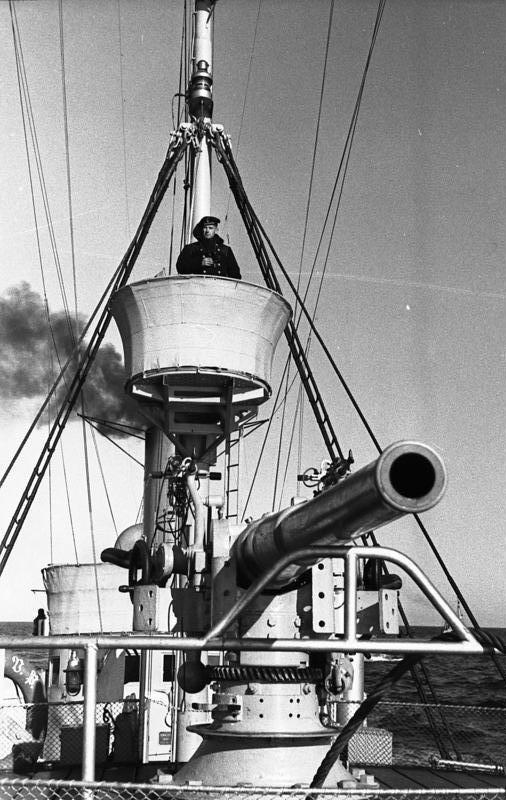
Lookout in the crow's nest of a VP-boat

Vorpostenboote typically carried one or two medium-calibre guns (e.g., 88 mm), many light automatic anti-aircraft guns (20–40 mm), and a varying number of machine guns. For anti-submarine warfare they were also fitted with depth charges. They were crewed by sixty to seventy men, most of whom were weapons personnel taken from the naval reserve. While Vorpostenboote were able to engage and defeat light naval forces – such as small motor gun boats – they were not powerful enough to effectively combat destroyers or larger warships.

Some Vorpostenboote (and submarine chasers) were given heavier anti-aircraft guns and re-rated as Flakjaeger or Flakkorvetten.

== History ==
=== World War I ===
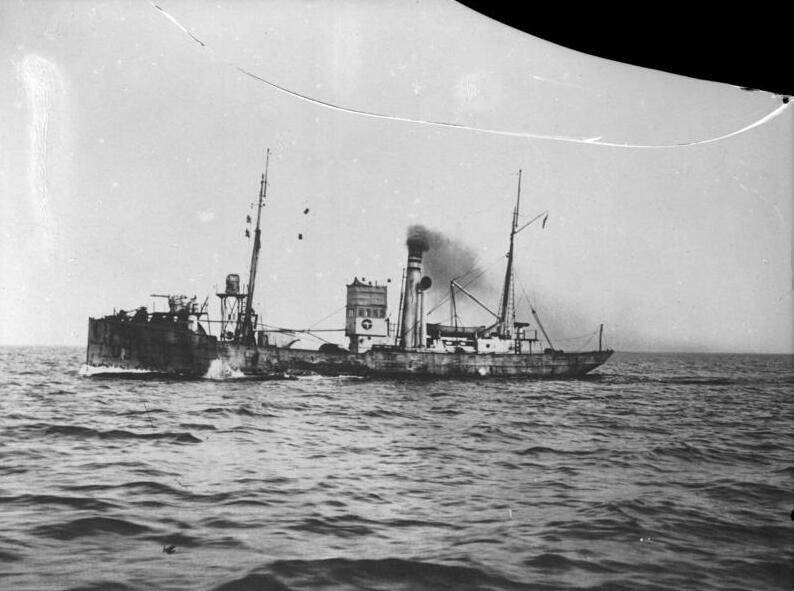
World War I Vorpostenboot Nürnberg in 1914

At the outset of World War I, the Imperial German Navy lacked sufficient numbers of warships to perform auxiliary tasks like coastal patrol and convoy escort. As such, the navy requisitioned a large portion of civilian fishing trawlers to perform these tasks, converting them into Vorpostenboote.

=== Interwar ===
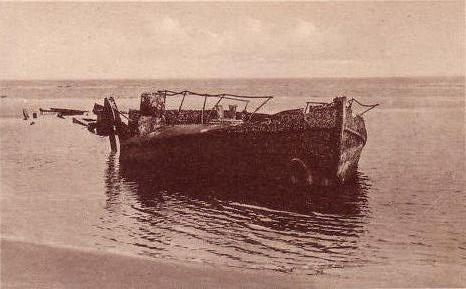
Wreck of the WWI Vorpostenboot Moltke off Spiekeroog, pictured in 1925

After World War I, Germany's shipbuilding industry suffered because of the Great Depression, and many of the larger shipbuilders were unable to continue construction. As such, few trawlers were constructed during this period. However, with the rise of the Nazis, the few remaining companies experienced a major financial boost. Trawler production was revitalized, and new ships which would eventually become Vorpostenboote were built, such as the Carl Röver and R. Walther Darré.

Throughout the 1930s, these trawlers also grew in tonnage, and 400 GRT ships were the standard by the end of the decade. By 1937, the Kriegsmarine began actively commissioning trawlers for the express purpose of converting them into Vorpostenboote, hoping to standardize the design and minimize the time it would take to convert the civilian ships into warships.

=== World War II ===
==== Invasion of Poland ====
The first operational Vorpostenboote flotilla (Vp-Flotilla) was formed in June 1939 in preparation for the naval operations of "Case White", the German invasion of Poland. Called the Reserve Patrol Flotilla, the flotilla consisted of eight commandeered vessels which were gathered together in just three days. By 18 August, orders were placed to increase the flotilla by ten vessels to a total of eighteen.

By the end of the Polish campaign in October, a significant number of new Vp-Flotillas had been raised. The 2nd, 3rd, 4th, 8th, and 11th flotillas consisted of eight trawlers each. Eight whalers made up the 13th flotilla, while coasters made up the 10th flotilla. The 12th and 15th flotillas consisted of a combination of whalers and trawlers, and the 1st flotilla was made up of eight steamers which would later be converted into Sperrbrecher mine clearance vessels.

==== Winter of 1939 ====
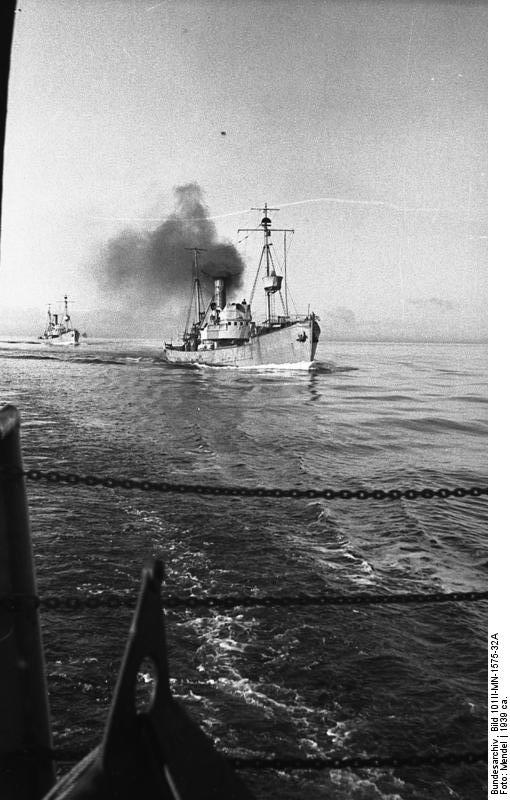
Several Vorpostenboote in formation in 1939

Several Vorpostenboote were lost in the harsh winter of 1939, in part due to mines (called "drifters") which had been broken free from their moorings by the foul weather. Ships sunk by these rogue mines included the Skolpenbank, Este, and Weser. The loss of the Skolpenbank led to the Seekriegsleitung (SKL, "Naval Warfare Command") clamping down on the amount of classified information carried on auxiliary vessels, since its wreck was never located and there was no way of knowing if information had fallen into enemy hands. Also during the winter, British submarine presence in the Baltic Sea increased, leading to several encounters with Vorpostenboote. While several depth charge attacks on the submarines were recorded, they were unsuccessful; on the other hand, British submarines were able to successfully attack and sink multiple Vorpostenboote. One instance of this was when HMS Sturgeon sank V 209 Gauleiter Telschow in the Heligoland Bight on 20 November, escaping without detection.

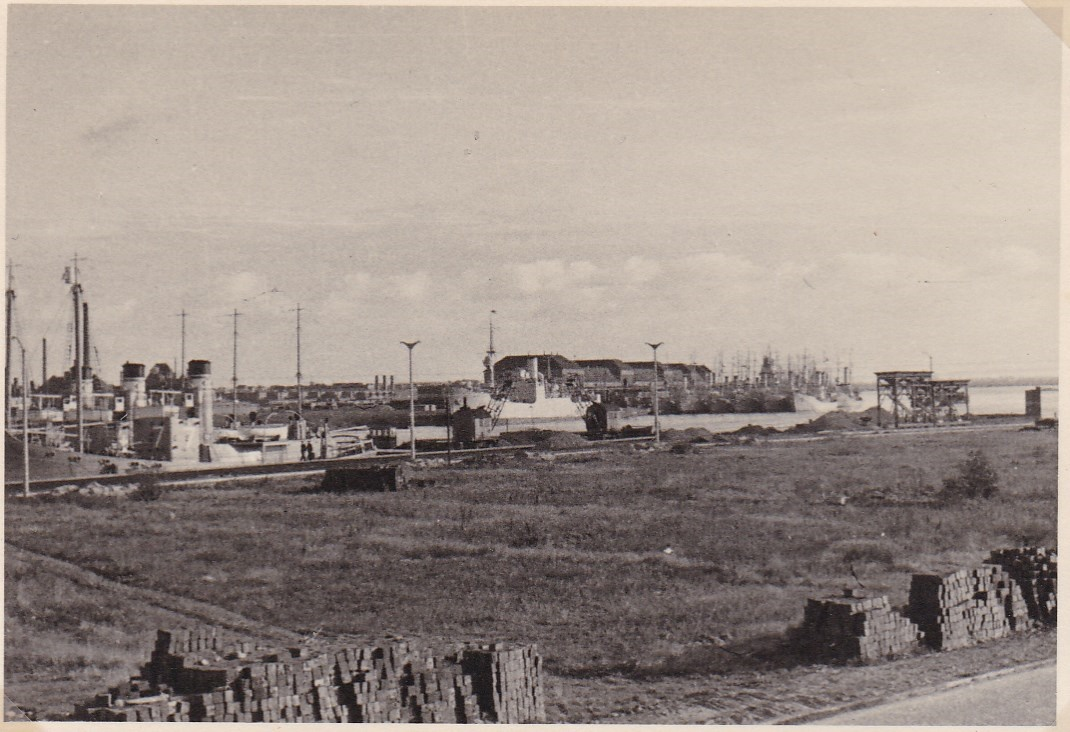
The 4th Vorpostenflotille in the Fischereihafen of Bremerhaven in 1940

Thick ice in the Baltic and rough sea conditions in the North Sea continued to hamper patrolling operations into 1940. In an attempt to combat these poor conditions, naval drifters in the North Sea were transferred to the Baltic, and trawlers from the Baltic were transferred to the North Sea. The drifters were better able to break up the ice, while the trawlers were still capable of holding up to rough sea conditions. However, this led to an overall reduction of ships patrolling the North Sea; only sixteen trawlers in two flotillas were operational at this time. The Befehlshaber der Sicherung West (Commander in Chief of Security West), under whose jurisdiction the North Sea patrols fell, repeatedly demanded a third flotilla be transferred to the North Sea, which was denied due to a lack of ships and manpower.

==== Invasions of Norway and Denmark ====
During the invasions of Norway and Denmark in April 1940, Vorpostenboote continued their patrol duties and also escorted landing groups and tankers in ten convoys. In Denmark, few of these operations were contested, but in Norway there was resistance by submarines and surface ships. Submarines were particularly dangerous, The British submarine HMS Triton attacked the 2nd convoy, which consisted of the transport ships Friedenau and Wigbert and a heavy escort of Vorpostenboote and minesweepers. Triton spotted the convoy on the afternoon of 10 April and sank both transport ships and Vorpostenboot Rau VI, resulting in the drowning of more than 900 German soldiers. Despite launching more than 70 depth charges, the convoy was unable to sink the Triton which escaped with only minor damage.

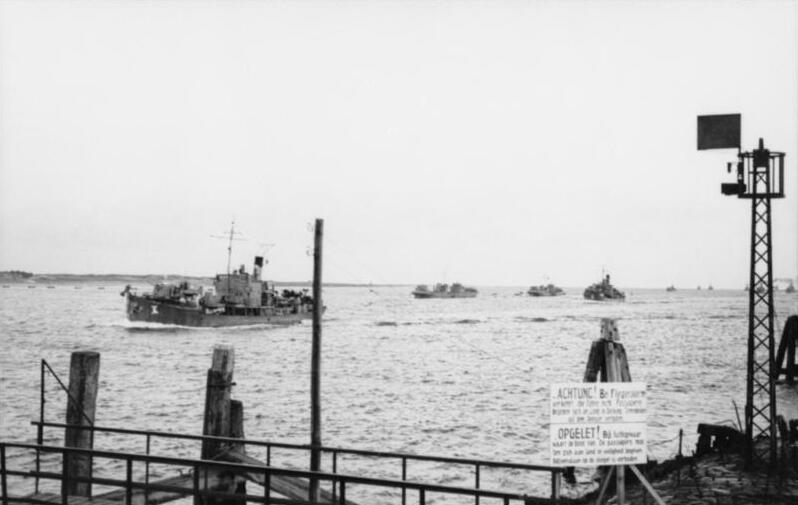
VP-Boat flotilla leaving a Dutch port during World War II

Following the capture of Norwegian coastal areas and harbors, German auxiliary naval forces were spread extremely thin. Even at the beginning of the war, the Kriegsmarine had a barebones amount of patrol ships and minesweepers, and the defense and patrol of the Norwegian and Danish coasts would require a sharp increase in ships and manpower. The Kriegsmarine quickly began to press captured Norwegian vessels into service, but these were inadequate in number. Compounding the problem, the complex and tangled jurisdictions of the German naval commands meant that almost all drifters and trawlers requisitioned at this time were sent to the Baltic Sea rather than being used to guard the Norwegian coast. There were a few minor windfalls for the stretched auxiliary forces, however, such as on 5 May when three British armed trawlers and a Norwegian torpedo boat ran aground in a German-controlled area to escape Luftwaffe bombers. The ships were captured and the trawlers were pressed into service as Friese, Salier, and Franke.

==== Invasions of France and the Low Countries ====
Even though the invasion and occupation of Norway and Denmark consumed the bulk of available Vorpostenboote, patrols in the North Sea had to continue in order to keep U-boat routes safe and clear of mines. With reduced numbers, the flotillas in the North Sea were susceptible to attack from British bombers and mines. The Hugo Homann fell victim to both these hazards: it was sunk by bombers on 15 April, salvaged and returned to service, and then promptly struck a mine and sunk on 6 May.

During the invasion of the Netherlands, Belgium and the Battle of France, Vorpostenboote mostly continued their usual duties without much interruption. During the entire period of the Battle of France, only a single Vorpostenboot was lost, when the Bayern struck a mine in the North Sea on 9 June. Once the Dutch capitulated, the Kriegsmarine immediately began evaluating captured trawlers for their suitability to be converted into minesweepers and Vorpostenboote. More than 300 suitable vessels were identified, which would be necessary to clear mines from and defend the recently captured French, Dutch, and Belgian harbors.

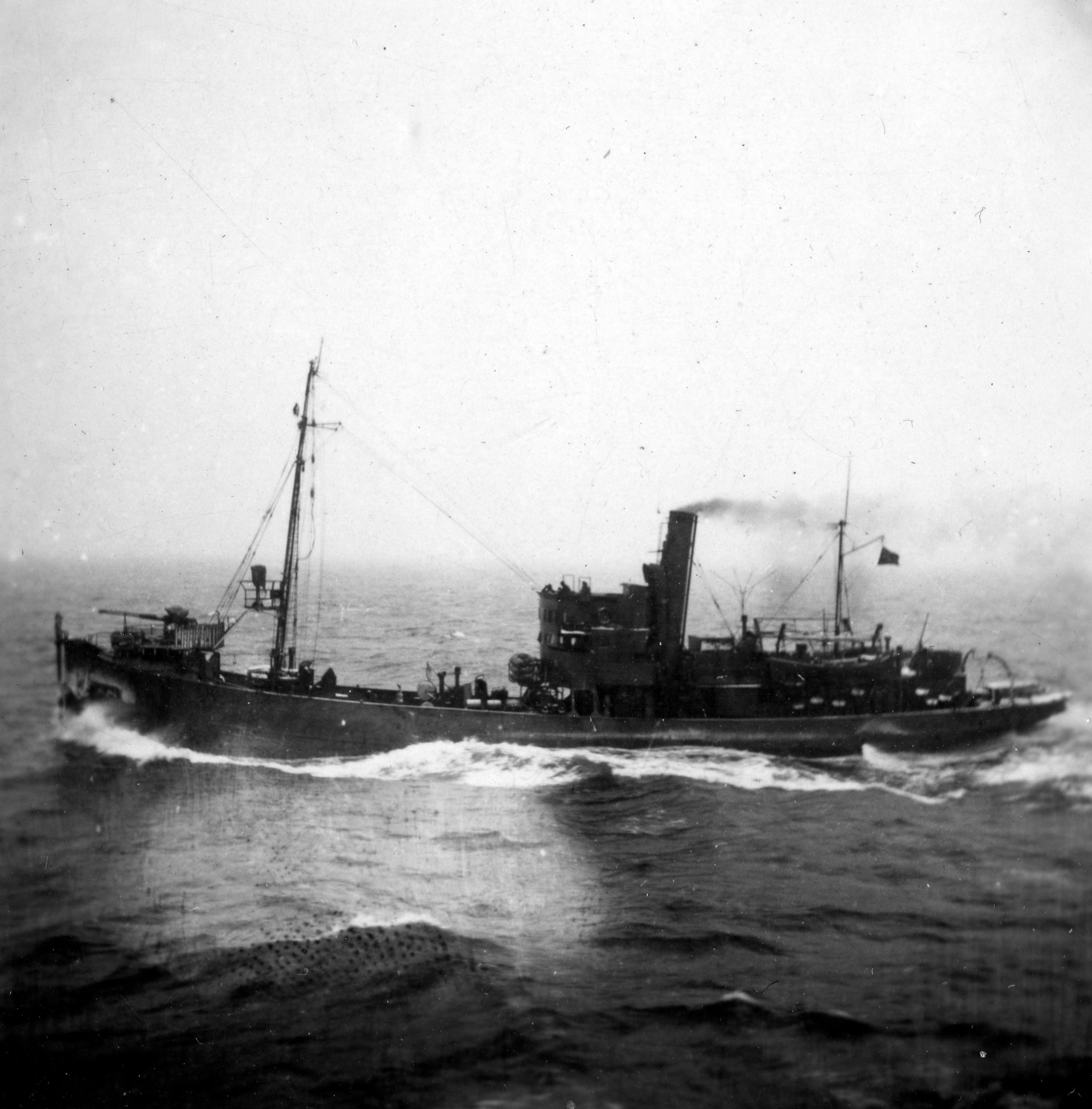
A Vorpostenboot (escorting the troopship Wuri) in the Skagerrak, January 1942

Once the new front in the West was opened, pressure on Norway eased significantly. However, British submarines were still laying mines and harassing vessels off the coast. In May, Antares fell victim to a mine and in June HMS Snapper ambushed a merchant convoy and sank Vorpostenboot Portland.

==== Occupation and reorganization ====
Following the capitulation of France, the Low Countries, and Norway, the Kriegsmarine had a coastline from the Arctic to Spain to protect. This entire stretch had to be cleared of existing mines, patrolled, and protected from submarines or re-mining. The demands of this task led to a major restructuring of the auxiliary navy, with new commands being established and new ships requisitioned and commissioned. Most of these were minesweepers and Sperrbrecher, but there were a handful of new formations which incorporated Vorpostenboote, such as the KSV norwegische Westküste in Bergen. Initially, the command consisted of just four fishing ships and two Vorpostenboote, but it would eventually expand to 45 vessels spread between three Vp-flotillas and a minesweeper flotilla.

The Kriegsmarine were not the only ones who were unprepared for this new situation. Britain's RAF Coastal Command was initially ineffective in disrupting German convoys. Poorly equipped and coordinated, the British bombers were unable to deal significant damage to convoys between Norway and Germany, partially because of effective protection offered by Vorpostenboote and Sperrbrecher escorts. However, these circumstances would shift in 1941 as Coastal Command received better aircraft, better intelligence, and the results of cracking German ciphers such as the Enigma codes. The greater threat posed by aircraft led to a gradual increase in anti-aircraft armaments carried on Vorpostenboote as the war went on, ultimately resulting in them being dubbed "flak ships" by Allied aviators.

Despite the growing capabilities of the British, total numbers of auxiliary warships in the Kriegsmarine continued to grow through 1941. The Security Forces underwent another reorganization, and by the end of the year four Sicherungsdivisions (Security Divisions) were established and steadily growing in size. Each of these consisted of five or six flotillas, of which one or two were Vp-flotillas.

==== Invasion of the Soviet Union ====
In June 1941, Germany turned east and invaded the Soviet Union in Operation Barbarossa. As this would primarily be a land war, the Kriegsmarine would play only a minor role in the invasion. Its main goal was to prevent any Soviet vessels from escaping the Baltic. However, there was a strong desire to avoid any major naval engagements, since once the port of Leningrad was taken, Soviet naval resistance would be made impossible. At the outset of the invasion, the Kriegsmarine was mainly occupied with minelaying and minesweeping, and the 3rd Vp-flotilla was part of the large minesweeper contingent patrolling the Baltic Sea. There was resistance to this activity by Soviet surface ships, especially in the Gulf of Riga. One convoy escorted by Vorpostenboote was attacked by a large Soviet force of four MTBs, various aircraft, the cruiser Kirov and its supporting destroyers. The attack only managed to sink the landing ship Deutschland, inflicting minor damage on several other escort ships. Similar attempts to contest the Baltic were ultimately unsuccessful, but did serve to slow the German advance and prevent total control of the sea.

==== Channel Dash ====
Route of the Channel Dash, code name Operation Cerberus

The capitulation of France allowed for an increase in commerce raiding by German warships against British shipping. Following successful raids in the North Sea, the German capital ships Scharnhorst, Gneisenau, and Prinz Eugen ended up in port at Brest in Brittany for repairs and maintenance. The ships began to be harassed in port by British air attacks after Winston Churchill issued the Battle of the Atlantic directive, which sought to reduce the ability of Germany's surface fleet to raid commerce. These bombing missions were increasingly effective, and in one instance, Gneisenau was torpedoed on 28 March, went into drydock, and was again bombed on 10 April. The air raids continued throughout 1941 and into 1942, with 37 percent of Bomber Command sorties between 10 December and 20 January 1942 targeting the ships at Brest.

At the same time, Adolf Hitler was convinced that the ships at Brest were required in the North Sea to contest an expected British invasion of Norway. Against the advice of his advisors, he demanded the ships make a surprise dash through the English Channel to safety in German-controlled ports. Such a move would require extensive Luftwaffe and escort ship coverage to prevent British air sorties from sinking the capital ships. Vorpostenboote were to act as minesweepers and outpost boats placed along the route of the convoy. VP boats began their involvement in the operation well before any ships left Brest; ships of the 20th Vp-flotilla began mine clearing to open safe passageways through the Channel in the days leading up to the Dash.

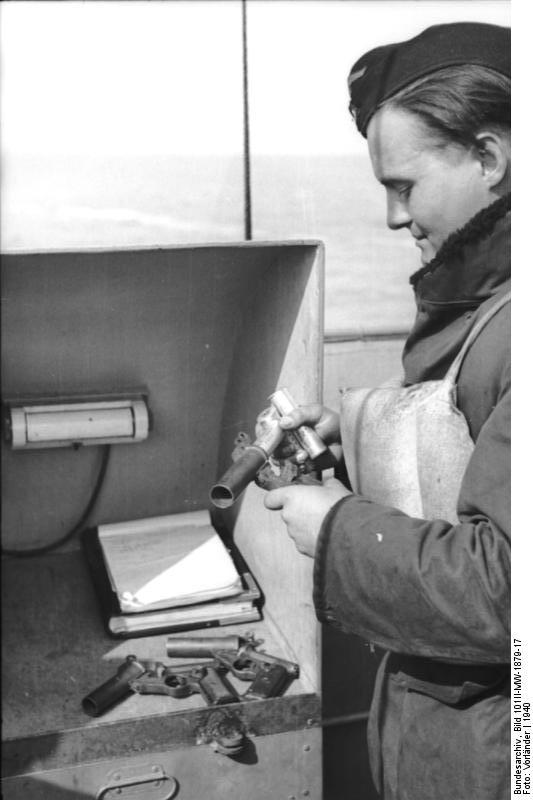
A German sailor loads a flare gun aboard a Vorpostenboot in the English Channel

On 11 February, the Channel Dash, code named Operation Cerberus, began. Three full flotillas of Vorpostenboote (the 13th, 15th, and 18th) along with five minesweeper flotillas and three Räumboot flotillas were stationed along the full route of the Dash. Because these boats could not keep up with the main convoy, they would meet it at strategic points where British intercepts were expected. There, they would provide guidance, outpost support, minesweeping, and flak cover to deter and distract air attacks. Operation Cerberus was an overwhelming success for the Germans. All three capital ships made it through the Channel with only minimal damage sustained, and only one escort ship was lost. It was a Vorpostenboot, the John Mahn, which was attacked twice by groups of Lockheed Hudson bombers and several fighters, which riddled it with machine gun fire and struck it with two bombs, which ultimately caused the ship to sink.

==== Saint-Nazaire Raid ====
On 28 March 1942, the British Combined Operations Headquarters launched a raid on the port of Saint-Nazaire codenamed Operation Chariot, which had the objective of destroying the large dock there and so prevent any large German warships from using it. German ships could only get to German ports by running the gauntlet of the Royal Navy and so Germany would not risk sending the battleship Tirpitz into the Atlantic to attack convoys. During the raid, the Vorpostenboote Sachsenwald and Gotland were on picket duty offshore between Noirmoutier and Saint-Nazaire. When the British Commandos were withdrawing back across the Channel, one of their motor launches, ML 306, was intercepted by the German torpedo boat Jaguar. The torpedo boat attacked ML 306, closing to short range and boarding the vessel, capturing it. The motor launch was later brought back to a German port by Sachsenwald and Gotland.

==== Growing challenges ====
By summer of 1942, Kriegsmarine auxiliaries were still in short supply in almost every theater of combat. Large numbers of minelayers were needed to ensure that the Soviets were not able to re-establish themselves in the Baltic Sea by slipping submarines through German lines. The 3rd and 17th Vp-flotillas were engaged in this task from 25 April, under the command of the Marineverbindungsstab Finnland. These activities, along with the many other responsibilities of the Kriegsmarine auxiliary commands, drew away ships and manpower from convoy escort duty. By this point, the Kriegsmarine was fielding only a quarter of the convoy escorts as had been demanded in 1940.

The problems the Kriegsmarine faced were worsened by the American entry into World War II. The start of American naval involvement in Europe was marked on 19 February 1943, when the USS Blackfish steamed into the Bay of Biscay. That afternoon, Blackfish spotted two Vorpostenboote, V 404 and Haltenbank. Recognizing their German colors, Blackfish launched two torpedoes at Haltenbank, one of which hit and sank the ship.

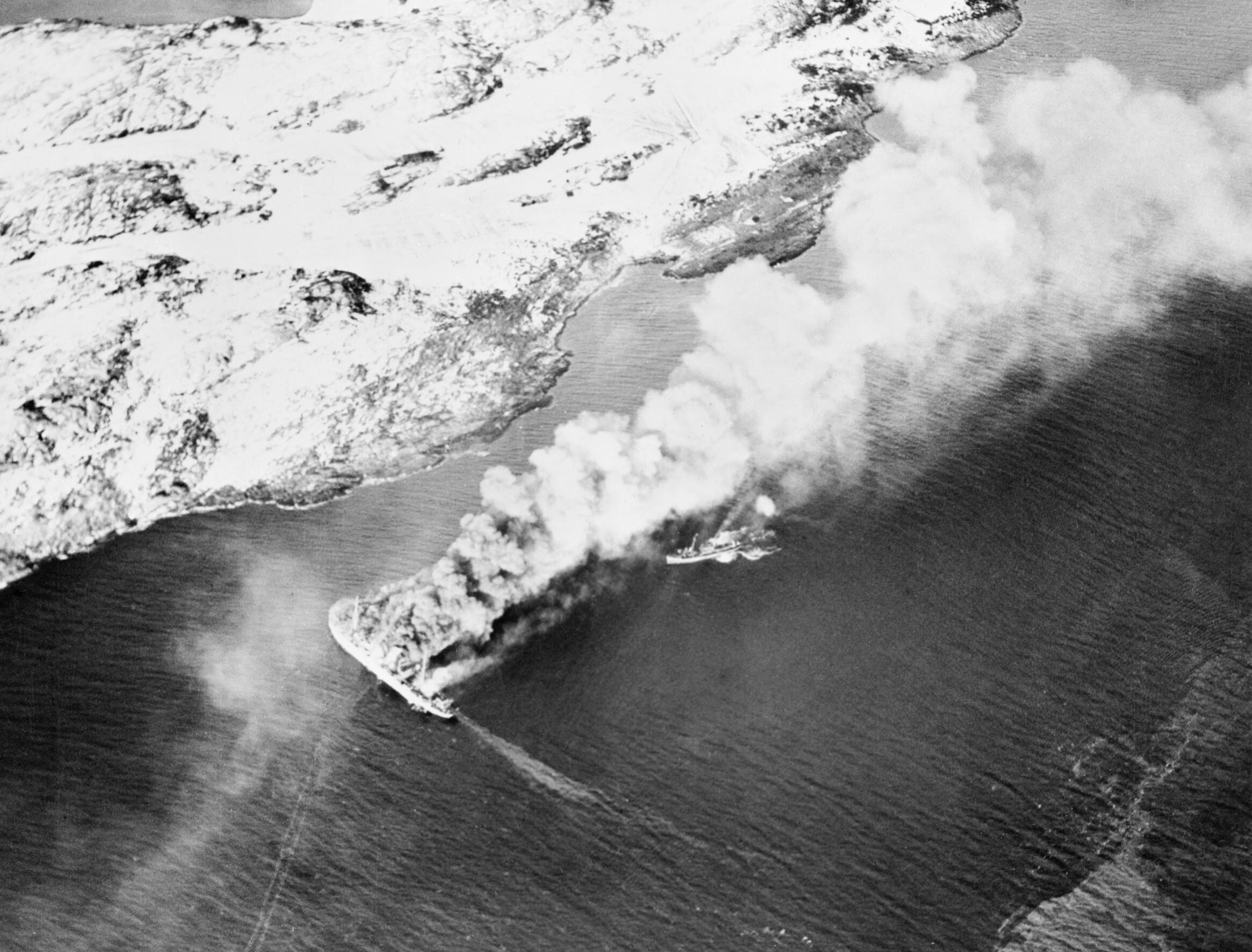
Prisoner ship MS Rigel and a VP-boat escort ablaze and sinking after a British bomber attack

At the same time, the British were also becoming a greater threat in the English Channel and along the Belgian and Dutch coast. The newly developed Fairmile D was larger and better armed than preceding motor torpedo boats (MTB) and motor gun boats, and was designed for combat with German patrol craft. Armed with this new ship, British offensive actions became increasingly common. These attacks were often costly for both sides, both in manpower and material. During March 1943, there were at least half a dozen instances where MTBs intercepted and attacked convoys and minesweeping flotillas. Despite being escorted by multiple Vorpostenboote, these engagements often led to the sinking of minesweepers or merchant ships; in just the week of 13 March, five large steamers were sunk by MTBs.

British destroyers, bolstered by the new MTBs, made more daring attacks on German shipping as well. In late April 1943, HMS Albrighton and HMS Goathland launched an attack on a coastal convoy. The blockade runner, an Italian tanker SS Butterfly, was escorted by Vorpostenboote Carl J. Busch and Pilote XIII and two submarine chasers. Almost immediately after the destroyers closed with the convoy, at around three in the morning, Pilote was hit by a shell on its stern. As fire was concentrated on the small ship, it fired back with its 88mm gun landing a direct hit on Albrighton's bridge. A British MTB closed on Pilote, which it engaged with its 37mm gun until a direct hit killed the gun crew. Pilote's captain ordered the ship to be abandoned, but before the order could be carried out a burst of machine gun fire killed him and several other men. The survivors continued to attempt to save their ship.

At dawn, the battle expanded to the air, with two dozen Czech-piloted Spitfires strafing the German convoy before being engaged by Luftwaffe fighters. Pilote again bore the brunt of this attack. However, only one bomb - which did not explode - struck the ship, damaging its engine ventilators and smokestack. When British ships and aircraft finally began to disengage at around six in the morning, one of the submarine chasers had been sunk, SS Butterfly was breaking up, and the Pilote had taken heavy casualties. Of its forty-one crew, eighteen were dead and nineteen injured, leaving only four men unharmed. Despite these losses, Pilote was able to disengage from the battle, limping into the port of Brest later that day. The ship had sustained more than 140 shell hits and 600 holes from machine gun fire.

On top of growing external threats, Kriegsmarine auxiliary ships also became the target of internal unrest. Denmark, whose occupation to this point had been relatively unopposed, experienced several dockyard strikes which affected five Vorpostenboote.

==== Early 1944 ====
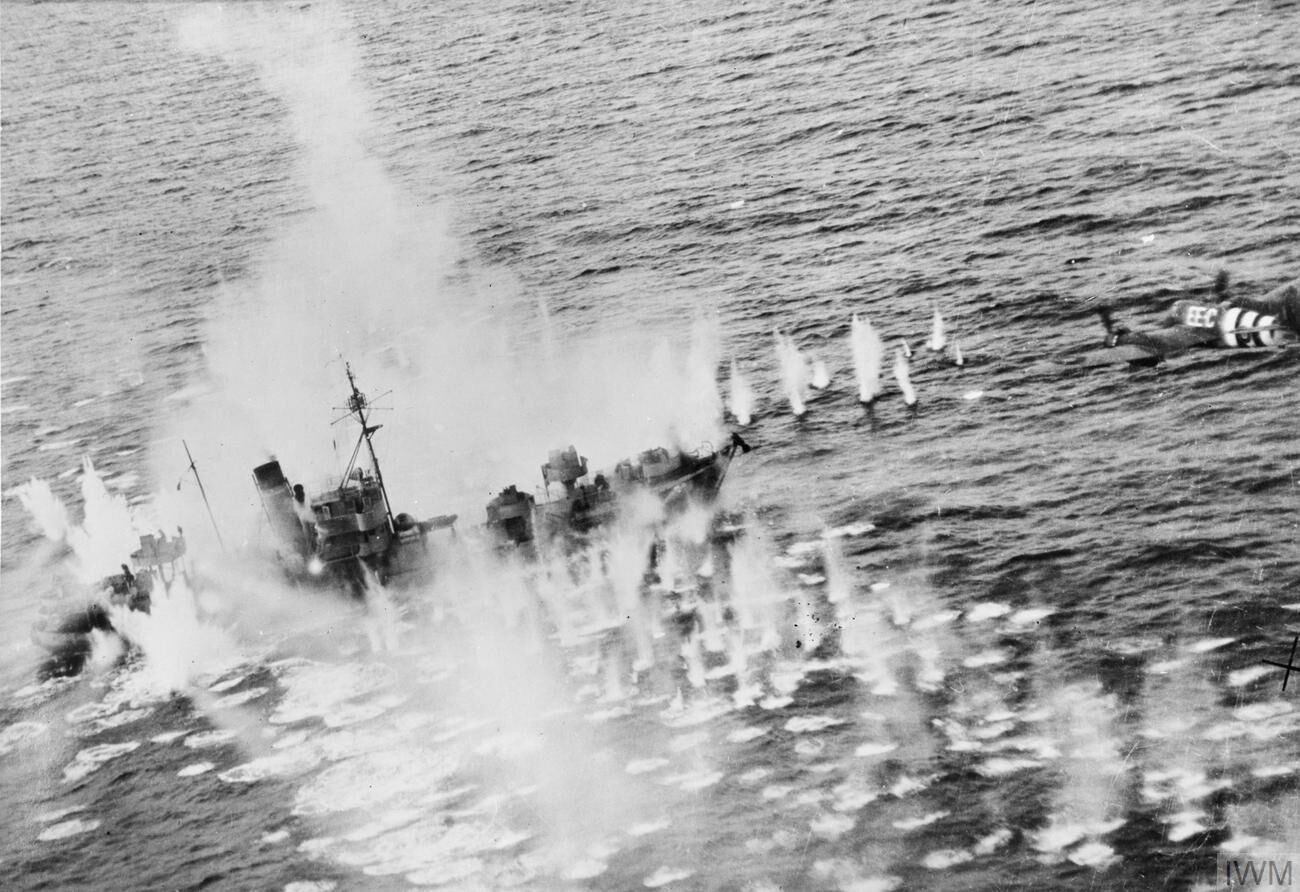
V 1605 Mosel under attack by Canadian (No. 404 Squadron RCAF) aircraft off Lillesand, Norway, 15 October 1944

The first months of 1944 saw minimal action from Vorpostenboote and other auxiliary ships to the west of the continent due to very poor weather conditions. When V 1411 attempted to put out, it ran aground and nearly capsized. At this time, the focus of Vp-flotillas became strengthening the Atlantic Wall: laying mines and defending "fortresses" along the coast. To that end, several flotillas were strengthened with armed trawlers from other units. However, there was insufficient German manpower to crew these ships. In the case of the newly bolstered 4th flotilla, it was considered that Italian personnel could take control of the ships. The commander of the 4th flotilla staunchly opposed this move, and instead only half the crew were replaced with Italians who remained under German command.

In the Baltic, the struggle to contain Soviet submarines continued. Surface operations in the Eastern Baltic had been almost completely stopped due to very poor sea state over a prolonged period of time coupled with Allied bombing of harbors and drydocks. In an attempt to solve this problem, nine converted whalers from the 17th Vp-flotilla were transferred from Skagerrak to the Gulf of Finland. This meant that there were fewer vessels available to intercept blockade runners going to or from Sweden, and a reduced presence along the Swedish coastline.

==== Normandy landings ====
On 6 June 1944, the Allied liberation of the European mainland began with the Normandy landings of Operation Neptune. Standing against the overwhelming naval strength of the Allied forces were 163 minesweepers, 42 Artillerieträger, and 57 Vorpostenboote. Early on the morning of D-Day, British glider-borne soldiers captured what is now called Pegasus Bridge, a key canal bridge at Bénouville which would prevent German reinforcements from reaching the British and Canadian beachheads. Two small German ships, whose identity has been attributed to Vorpostenboote Otto Bröhan and Friedrich Busse, steamed up the canal and counterattacked against the British forces now defending the bridge. The attack was ineffectual, causing only one minor injury, and eventually both ships were scuttled in the Caen Canal.

While a few Vorpostenboote attempted to make contact with the enemy during the landings, these all had little or no effect due to the overwhelming Allied naval and aerial supremacy. By July, surface resistance by the Germans was effectively non-existent, and the Royal Navy began to turn its attention to destroying the remaining German vessels still operating on the French coast. On 5 July, Operation Dredger was launched, which targeted auxiliary vessels which were escorting U-boats into and out of harbor. The operation resulted in the Battle of Pierres Noires, Canadian destroyers of Escort Group 12 detected on radar a group leaving Brest. It was two U-boats being escorted by the Vorpostenboote Alfred I, Vierge de Nassabielle, Leipzig, and Marie Simone along with two minesweepers. The Allied ships' opening salvo struck Alfred I, disabling its rudders and setting it ablaze. The U-boats managed to dive and escape the battle, and the German escorts returned fire, eventually driving the Allied ships away. However, Vierge de Nassabielle and Marie Simone were both badly damaged, and Alfred I had to be abandoned and would eventually sink.

Similar attacks continued throughout July, and in August what little forces the Kriegsmarine had remaining in western France were utterly destroyed in Operation Kinetic. In total, 62 auxiliary ships were sunk over the course of the three-week-long offensive. The most devastating moments during the offensive occurred on 23 August during the defense of Brest, when seven Vorpostenboote of the 7th Vp-flotilla were ordered to break out from the harbor and head south to Lorient. The ships set out in two groups, and the first (consisting of Memel, Marie Simone, and Michel François) were almost immediately detected by the light cruiser HMS Mauritius with two destroyers. The group scattered: Memel and Michel François ran aground and Marie Simone was destroyed ship as it attempted to make for shore. Shortly thereafter, the last four Vorpostenboote (Neubau 168, Neubau 240, Neubau 308, Alfred III) were detected. This group was better armed and armored, and in the early hours of 24 August laid down smoke and opened fire on the closing British ships. Neubau 240 and Neubau 308 quickly ran aground, continuing to fire until incoming shells forced them to abandon ship. Alfred III and Neubau 168 were pounded with shellfire while grounded on a reef within sight of shore; Neubau 168 was sunk and Alfred III raised the white flag in surrender. HMS Ursa moved to capture the ship, but HMCS Iroquois launched a torpedo into the boat, causing an explosion which tore the ship in two. The 7th Vp-flotilla had been completely destroyed, and on 20 September it was formally disbanded.

From this point on, the remaining flotillas had little naval action besides sitting in port in the coastal fortresses which were under siege. Occasionally, single or small groups of Vorpostenboote made patrols of the harbor entrances to dissuade landings or incursions. However, this was unsustainable, as many of the men in the flotillas were being redeployed as infantry and made to fight on the front lines.

==== Eastern Front in 1944 ====
At the same time as the Normandy landings were taking place, the Soviet Vyborg–Petrozavodsk offensive was initiated to force Finland out of the war. The Soviet Baltic Fleet supported effective amphibious landings, helped force the Finnish defenders to retreat. At sea, German mine positions were coming under increasing pressure from Soviet aerial attacks. In July, one mined area was attacked 26 times, resulting in the sinking of a freighter, Vorpostenboot Natter, and four other auxiliary vessels. In August, two Artillerieträger and five Vorpostenboote set out to contest Soviet landings between Lake Peipus and Lake Pleskau. The flotilla successfully engaged Soviet land batteries and landed troops, and the German defenders were able to push back their advance. On the island of Piirissaar, German troops were trapped and required evacuation. On 21 August, four Artillerieträger and two Vorpostenboote provided covering fire for the evacuation.

=== Post World War II ===
By the end of the war, the Kriegsmarine's auxiliary forces were almost completely annihilated. However, some of the operations which Vorpostenboote were responsible for continued past 1945, especially minesweeping. On 21 June 1945, the German Minesweeping Administration was formed by the Allies under Royal Navy control from Kriegsmarine sailors and vessels. At least five former Vorpostenboote were included in nearly 300 vessels carrying out mine clearing sorties, which resulted in the disarming of 2721 mines by the time it was replaced by a civilian organisation in January 1948.

== See also ==
- List of Vorpostenboote in World War II
- Naval trawler
