= Osmussaar Landscape Conservation Area =

Protected area in Estonia

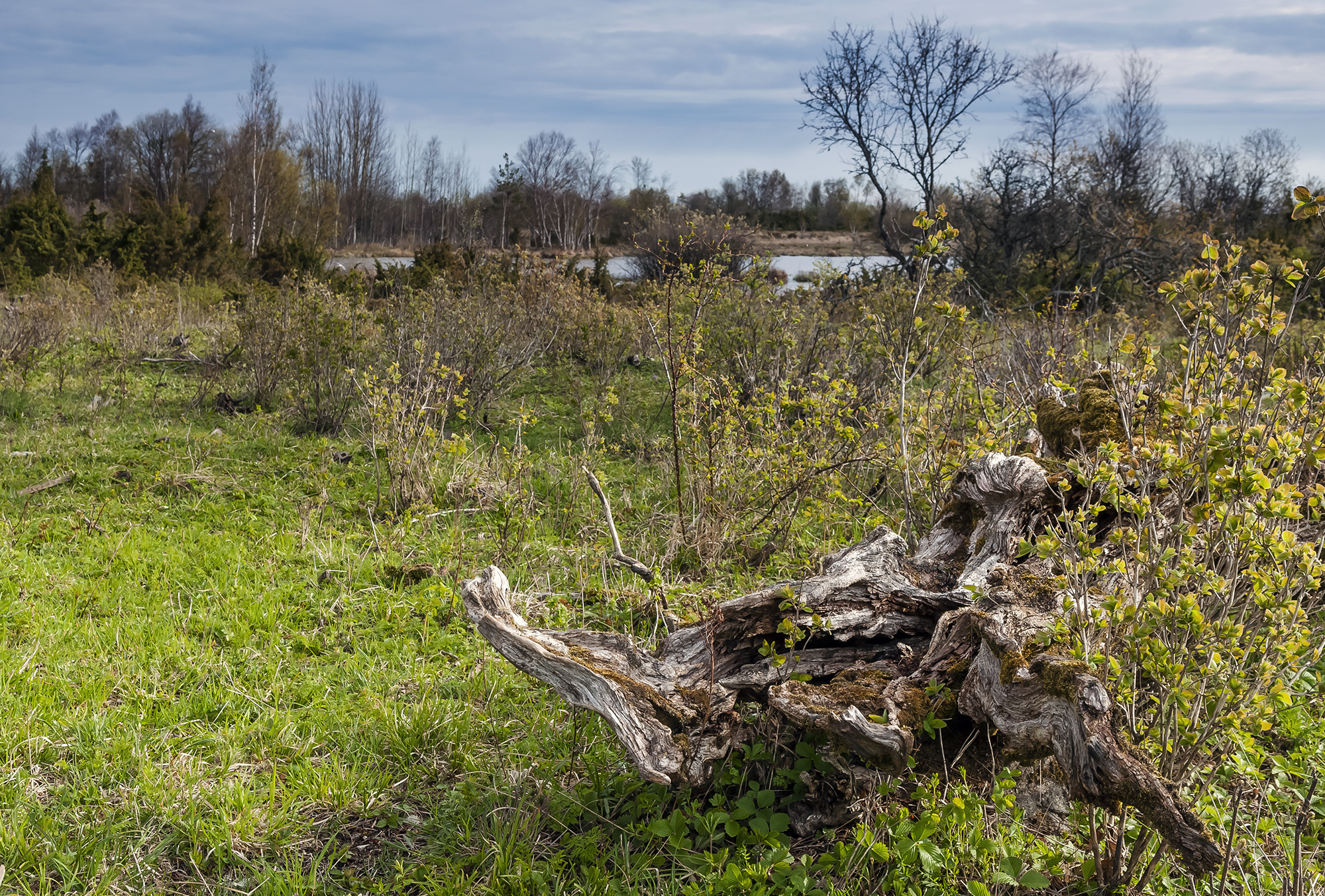
- Kappelkärre Lake in Osmussaar.

- Location within Estonia
- Location: Estonia
- Coordinates: 59°17′N 23°25′E
- Area: 489 ha (1,210 acres)
- Established: 1978 (2005)

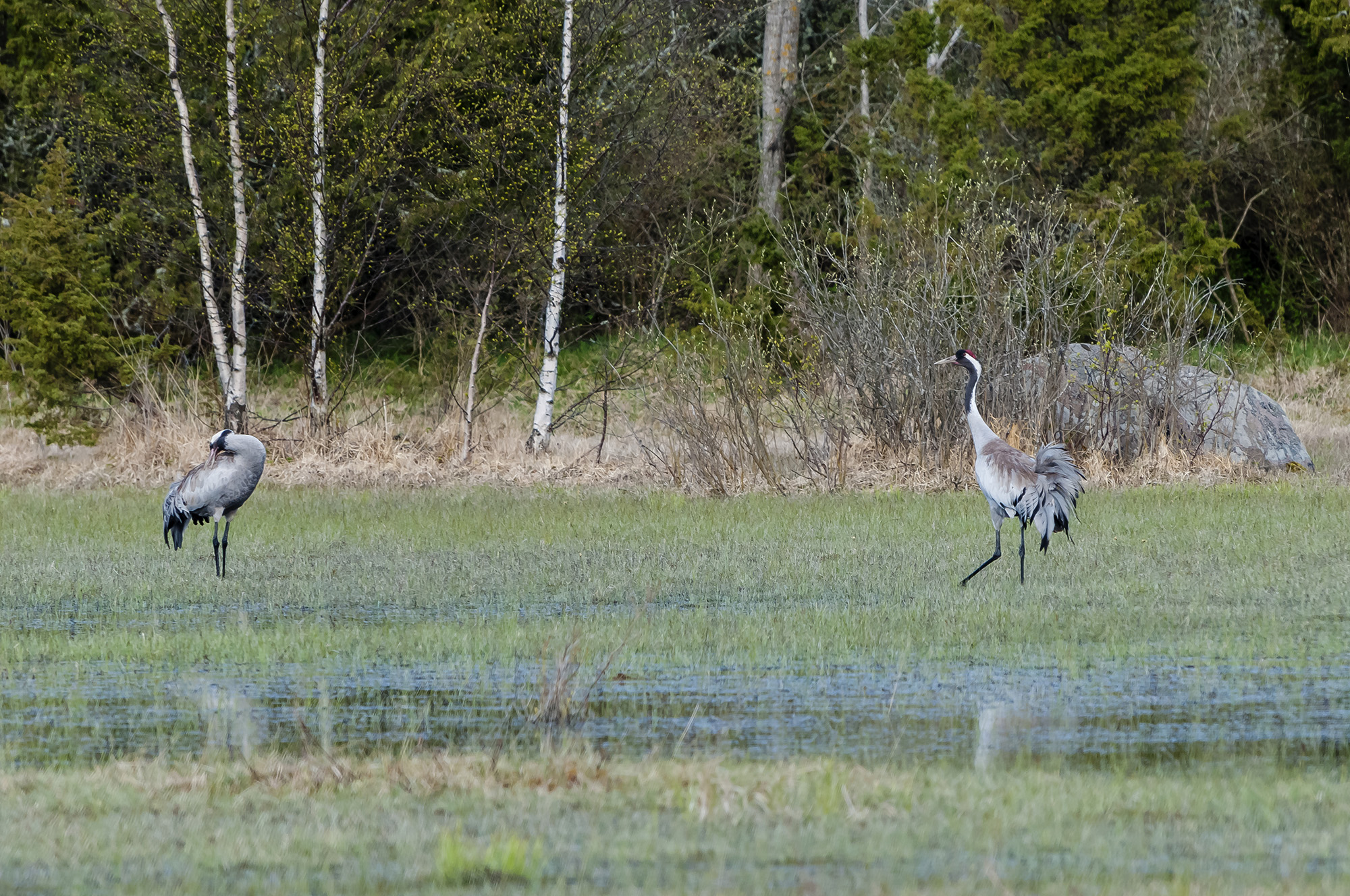
Common cranes in Osmussaar.

The Osmussaare landscape reserve is situated in Lääne County Noarootsi Parish on the island of Osmussaar, Estonia. Its size is 489 ha. The reserve is part of the Natura 2000 network. The reserve was created in 1996 in order to protect rare and scientifically valuable geological objects (such as bedrock outcrops, shingle deposits, and erratic boulders consisting of Neugrund breccia) and plant communities. The reserve is also important for bird migration and lies within the Nõva-Osmussaar Important Bird Area.

There are four lakes on the territory of the reserve: Kappelkärre, Krokatstaindappen, Lihlhamne, Inahamne.

== Bird species under nature protection during the migration period ==
Pandion haliaetus, Gavia arctica, Cygnus columbianus, Circus cyaneus, Aquila pomarina, Grus grus, Sterna sandvicensis.

== Other bird species ==
Haliaeetus albicilla, Crex crex, Podiceps grisegena, Cygnus cygnus, Sterna caspia Cepphus grylle, Columba oenas, Anthus cervinus, Calidris alpina, Anser erythropus, Larus fuscus ja Eptesicus nilssoni.

== Plant species under nature protection ==
Cochlearia danica, Anthyllis coccinea, Ophrys insectifera, Cardamine hirsuta, Draba muralis, Hornungia petraea, Salix repens, Dactylorhiza cruenta, Herminium monorchis, Liparis loeselii, Malus sylvestris, Dactylorhiza incarnata, Epipactis atrorubens, Gymnadenia conopsea, Epipactis palustris, Listera ovata, Orchis militaris, Platanthera bifolia, Cerastium pumilum, Sagina maritima, Oxytropis pilosa, Polygonum oxyspermum.
