= Inahamne =

Lake in Estonia

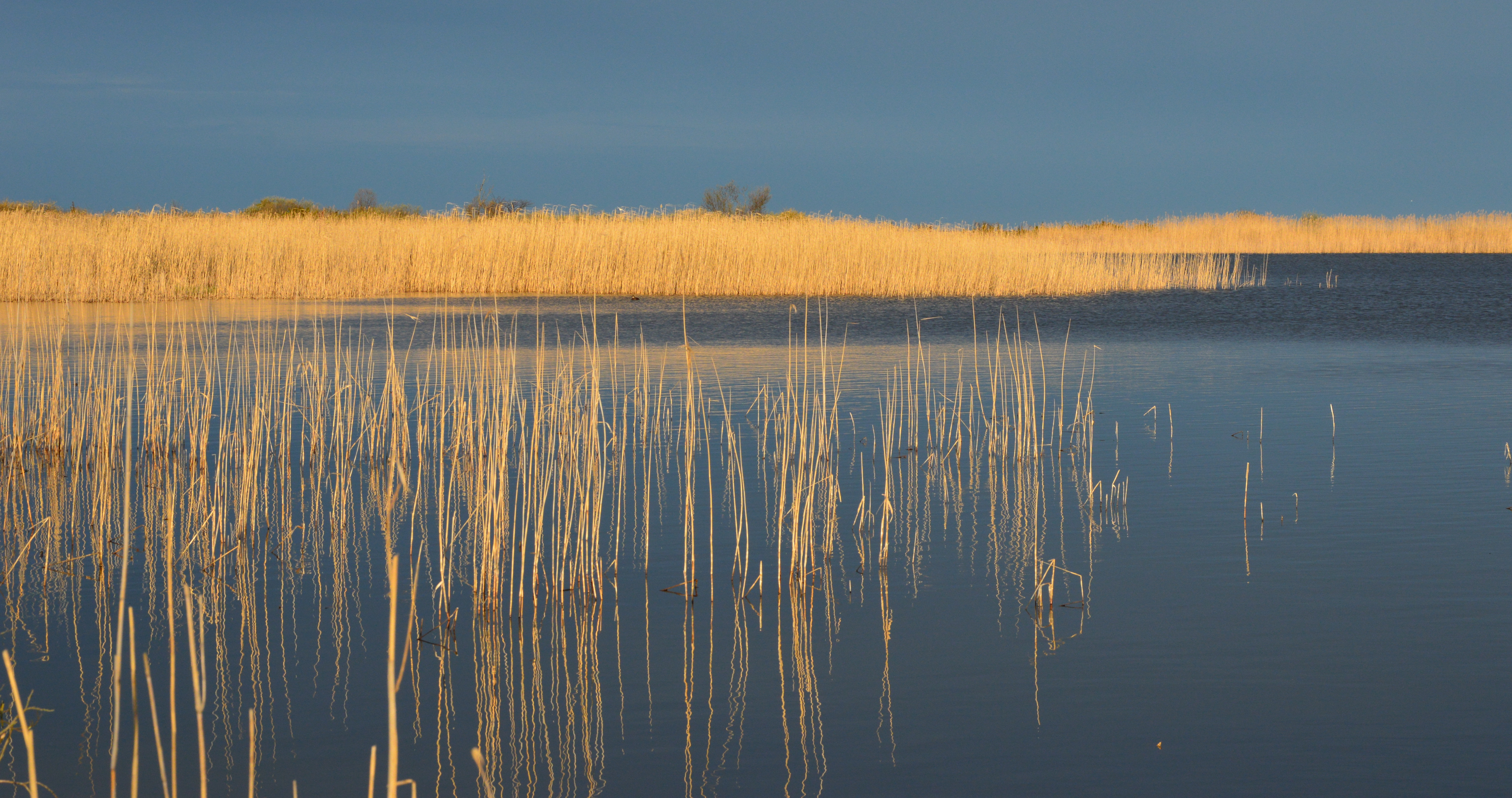

- Location within Estonia
- Location: Lääne County Lääne-Nigula Parish on the island of Osmussaar, Estonia
- Coordinates: 59.2814°N 23.4100°E
- Type: lake
- Max. length: 650 meters (2,130 ft)
- Surface area: 13.9 hectares (34 acres)
- Average depth: 0.5 meters (1 ft 8 in)
- Shore length^{1}: 2,660 meters (8,730 ft)
- Surface elevation: 0.9 meters (2 ft 11 in)
- ^{1} Shore length is not a well-defined measure.

Inahamne (also In hamne, Swedish: Skånvike) is a lake in Estonia. It is located in the village of Osmussaar (Swedish: Odensholm) in Lääne County, Lääne-Nigula Parish, on the island of Osmussaar. The lake lies in the southern part of Osmussaar, 100 meters (330 ft) from Storhamne Bay. The name Skånvike is used for the northern part of the lake.

== Physical description ==
The lake has an area of 13.9 hectares (34 acres). The lake has a maximum depth of 0.5 meters (1 ft 8 in). It is 650 meters (2,130 ft) long, and its shoreline measures 2,660 meters (8,730 ft).
