= Osmussaar Chapel =

Chapel in Estonia

Coordinates: 59.2888°N 23.4013°E

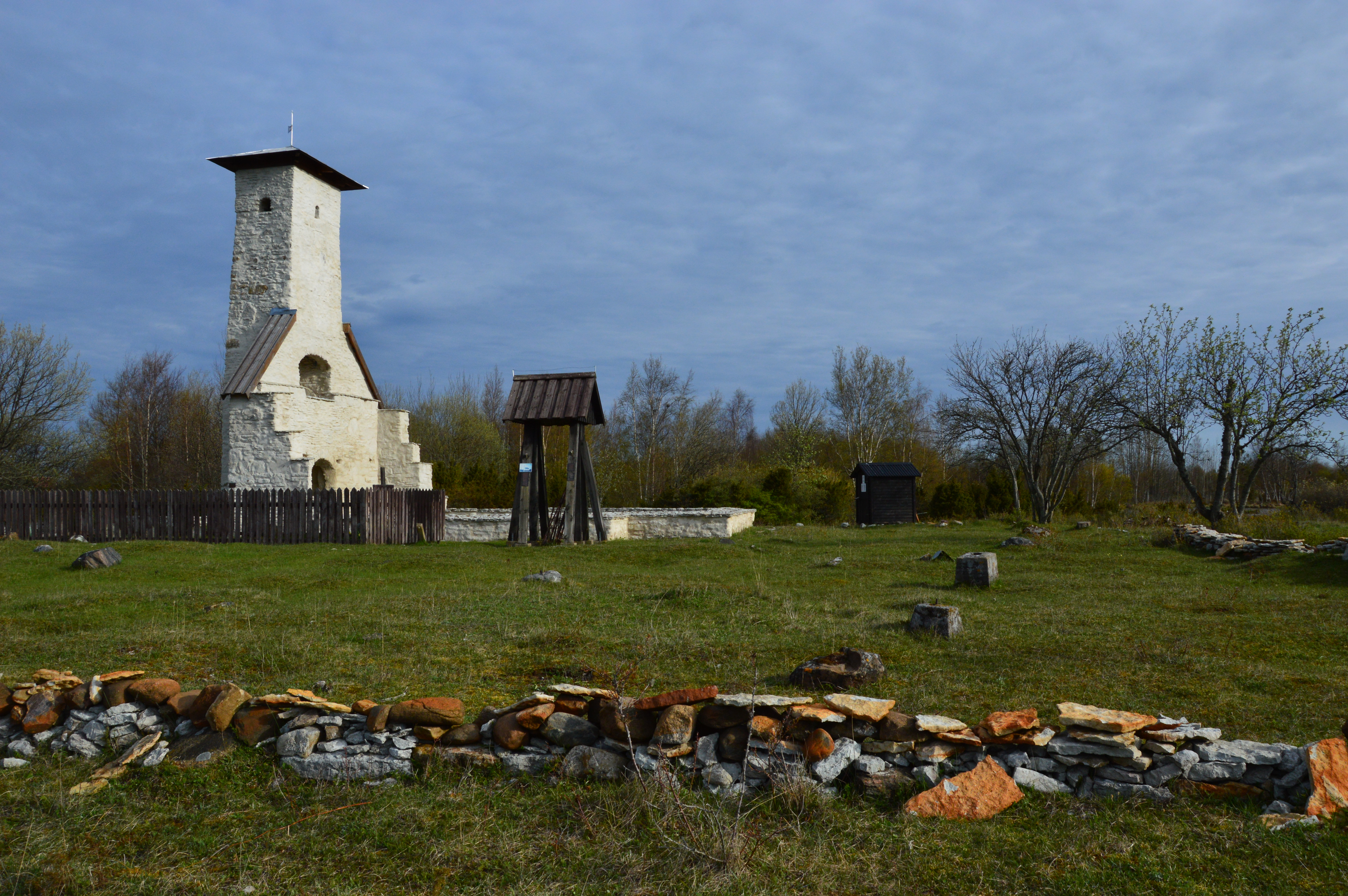
Chapel and cemetery ruins in 2015

Osmussaar Chapel (Jesu Kapell in Swedish, Jeesuse kabel in Estonian) is a chapel on the island of Osmussaar which is currently in ruins.

In 2014 the chapel along with the cemetery of Osmussaar was declared a national heritage site.

The first wooden chapel was built at the port of Osmussaar in the 16th century. As the island of Osmussaar rises 3 mm per year, the chapel now stands 1.5 km north of the port.

In 1766 the limestone chapel was completed.

In 1852 a figurehead of Martin Luther reading the Bible was installed on the chapel gate. The figure came from a wrecked British ship.

On the wall of the chapel there is a plate with the names of the seven families who were forced to leave the island in 1940 to make room for the Red Army.

The chapel was damaged during World War II and only the facade with the tower is still standing.

In 1994 the new belfry built by the previous inhabitants was consecrated.

The remnants of the chapel were conserved in 2011.

== Gallery ==
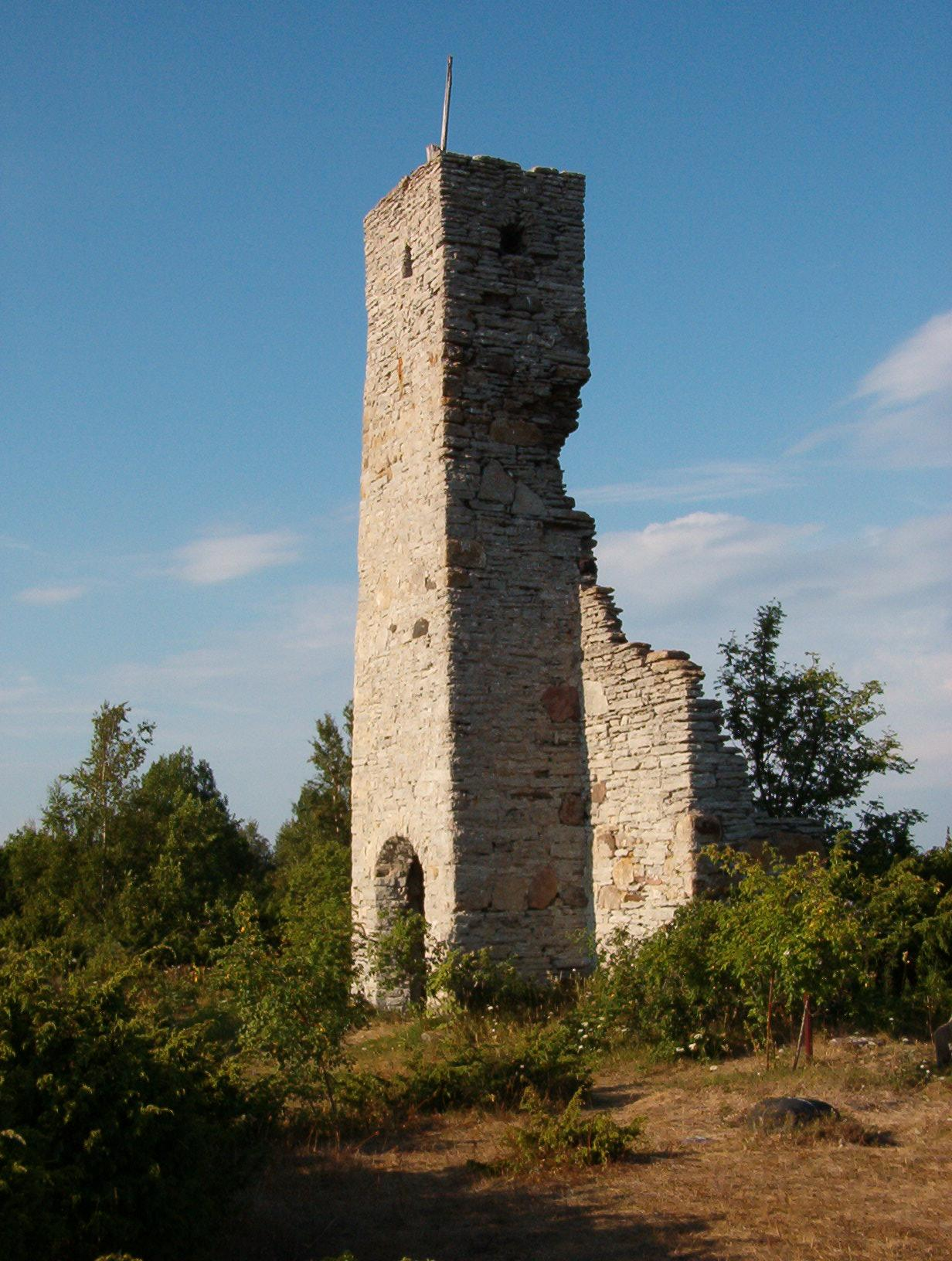
Ruins in 2003

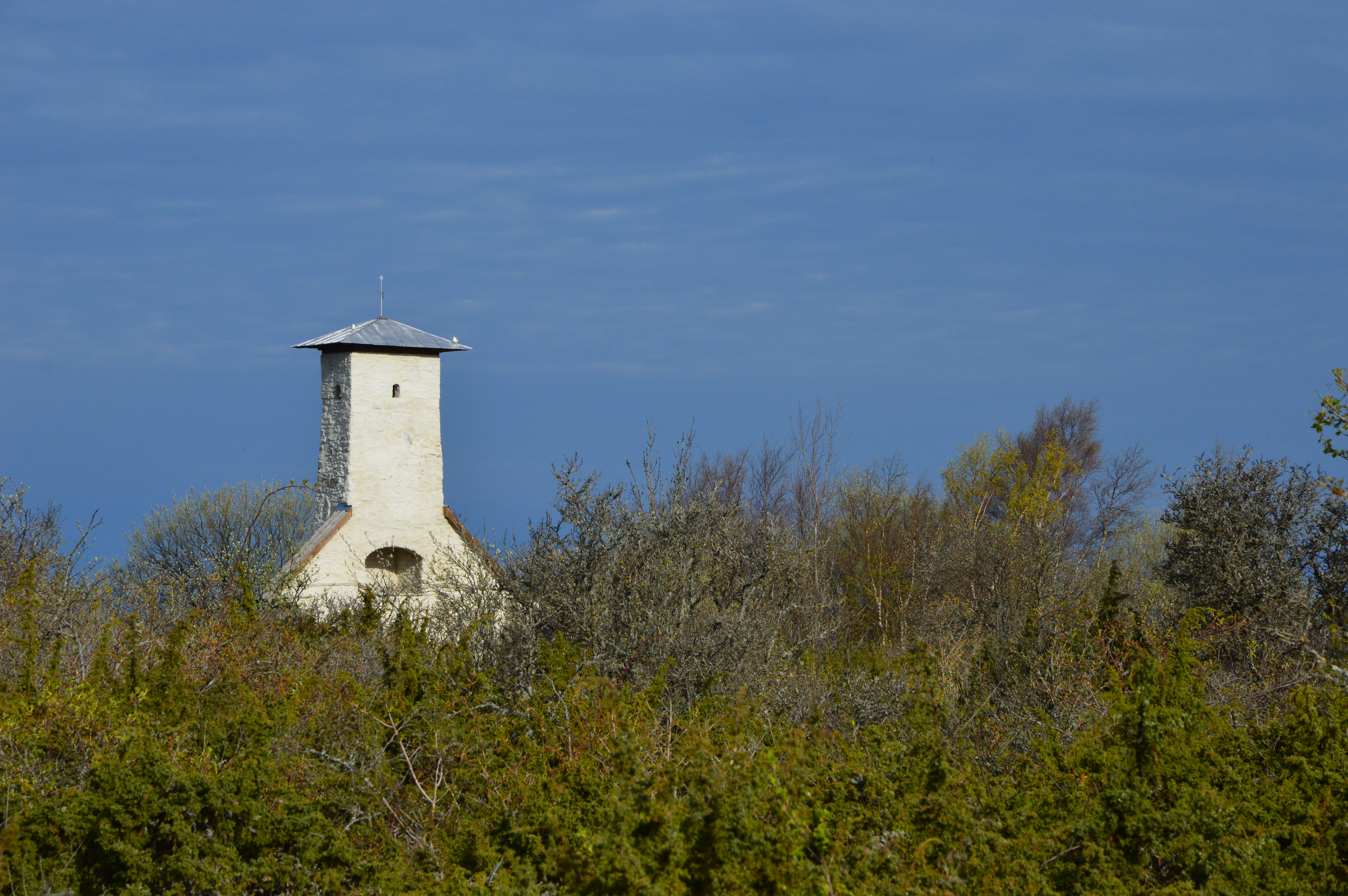
Ruins in 2015

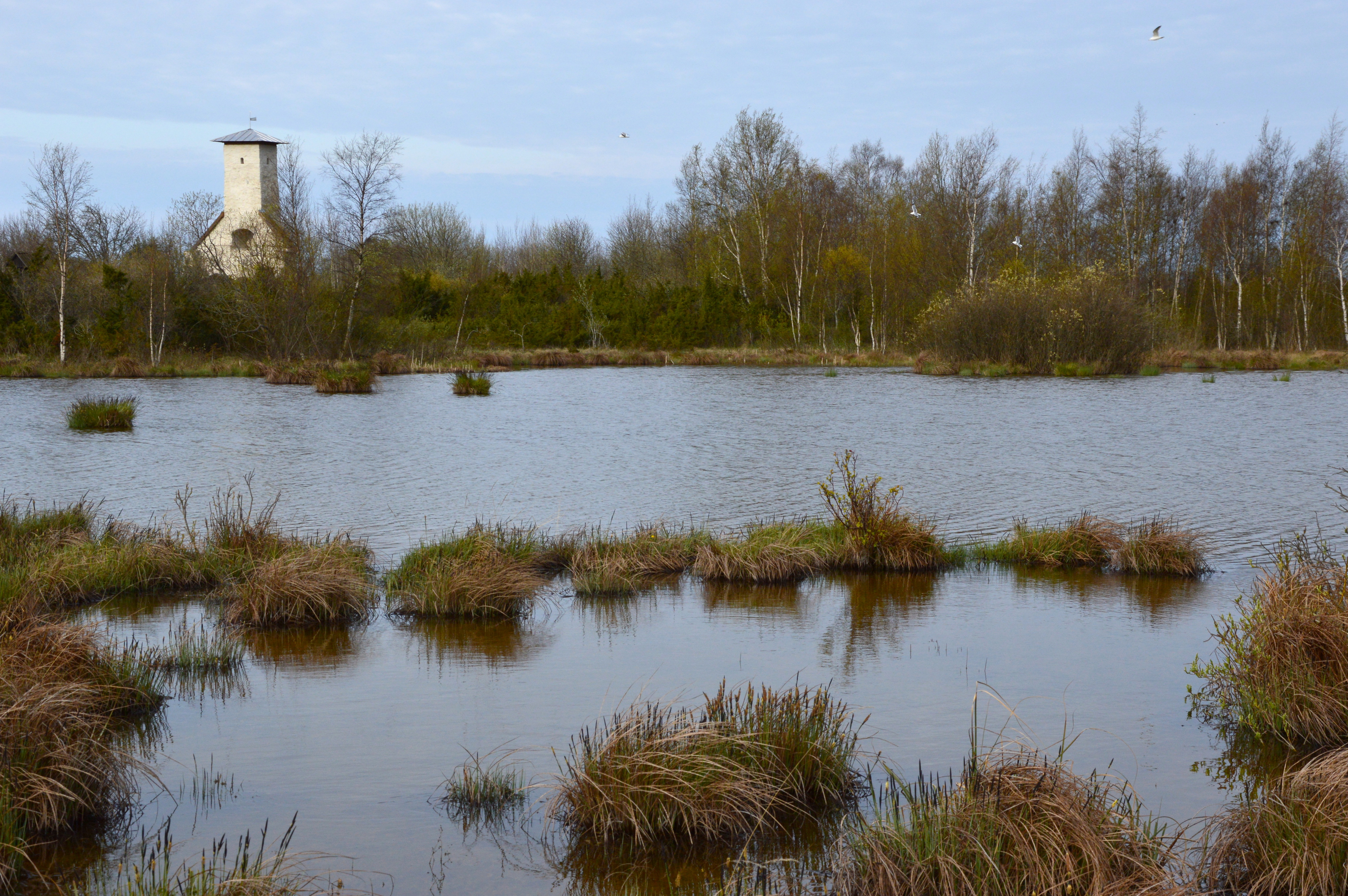
Chapel and Lake Kappelkärre

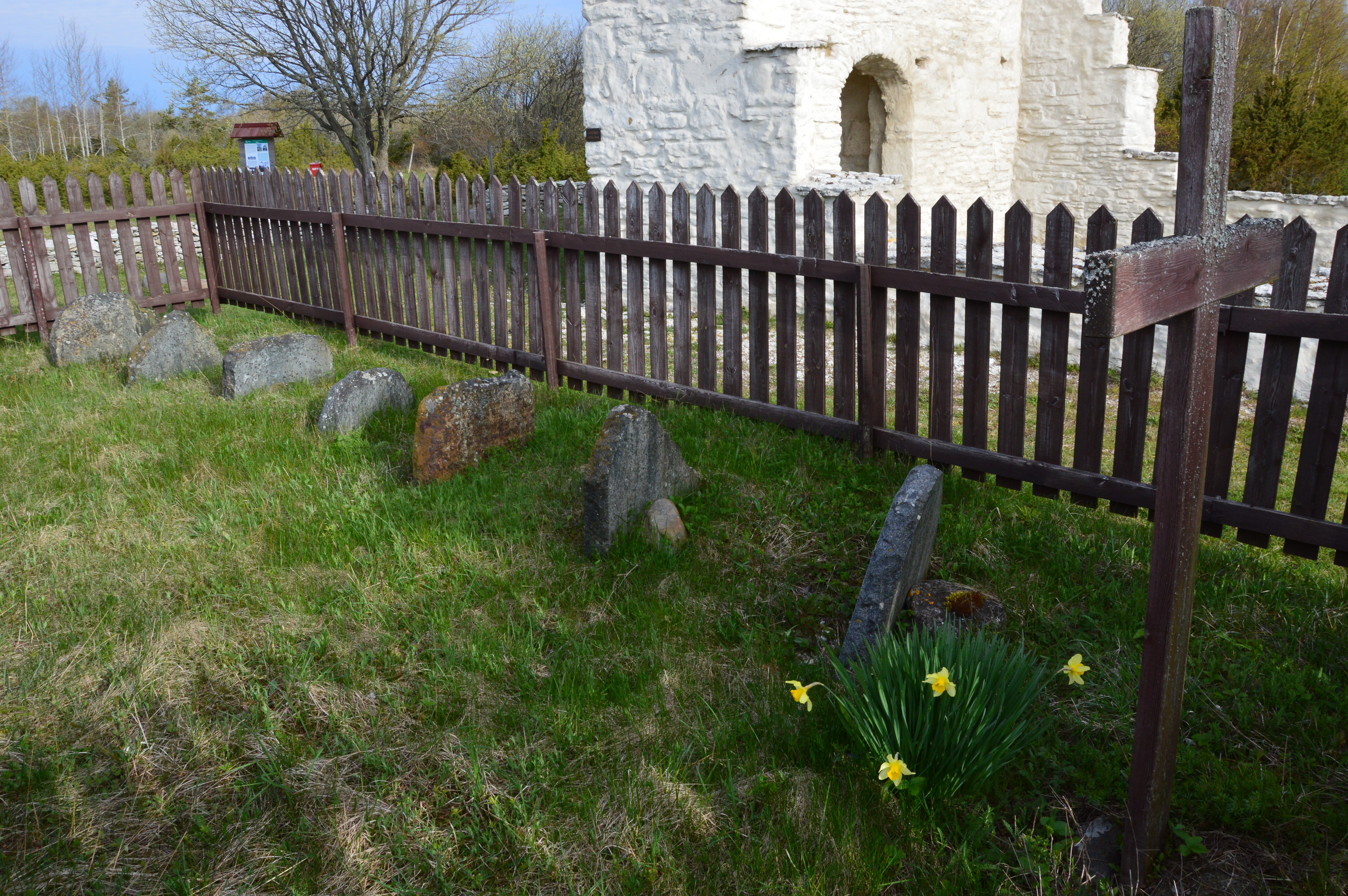
Memorial site to the families who lived on the island
