= Neugrund crater =

Meteorite crater in Estonia

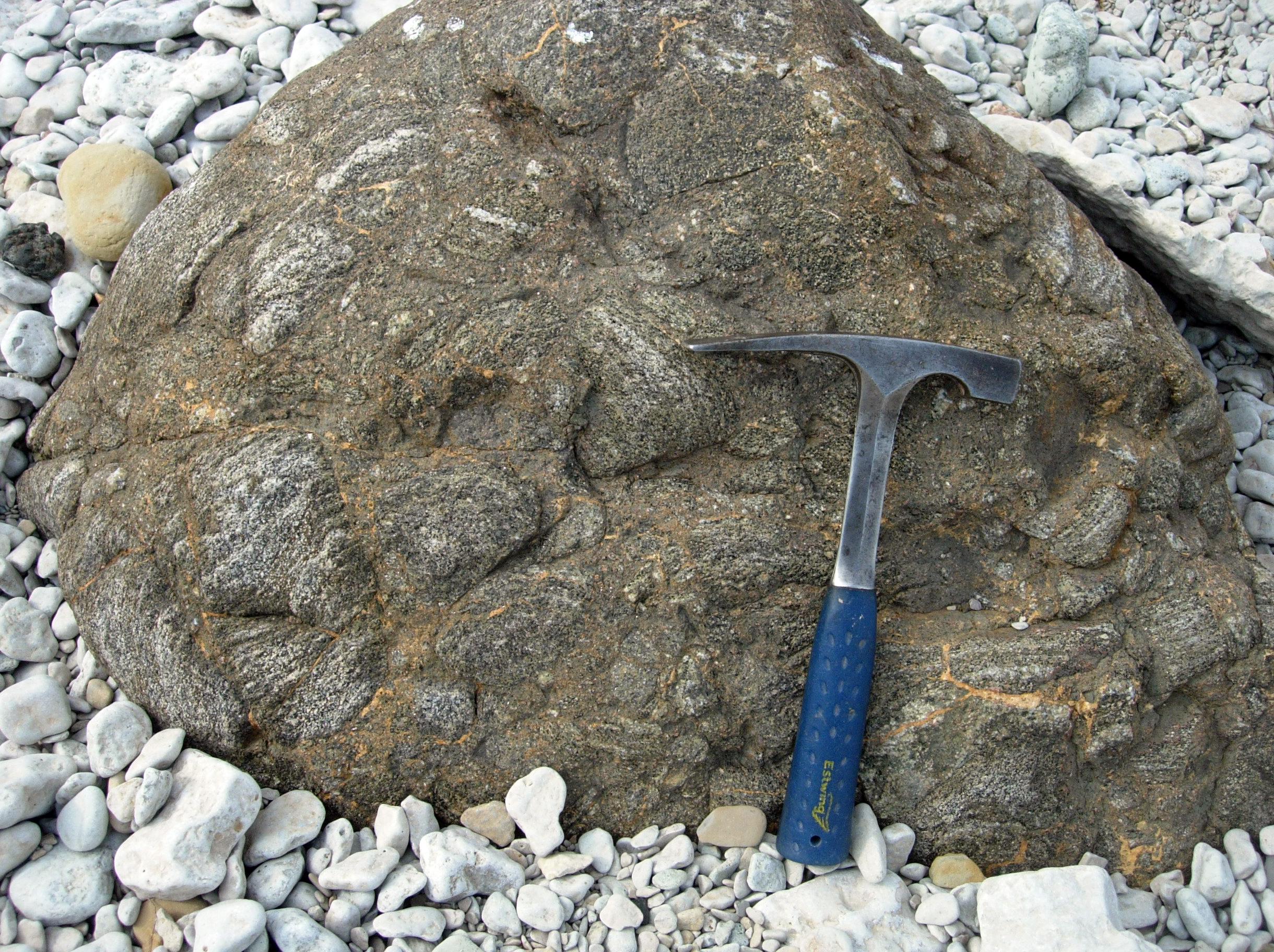
- Boulder of gneiss breccia on Osmussaar, Estonia, possibly thrown there by the Neugrund impact

- Location within Estonia
- Location: Baltic Sea, Lääne County, Estonia; 59°20′N 23°40′E

Impact crater structure
- Confidence: Confirmed
- Diameter: 8 km (5.0 mi)
- Age: ~535 Ma; Cambrian
- Exposed: No
- Drilled: -

Neugrund is a meteorite crater in Estonia. It is 8 km (5.0 mi) in diameter and was previously estimated to have been formed in the Ordovician around 470 Ma, with later research revealing a possible Cambrian origin (around 535 Ma). The crater is at the bottom of the sea and is not exposed at the surface. Boulders of gneissic breccia found on the coast of Osmussaar, a nearby island, are believed to have been thrown there by the explosion. It has been proposed that the Neugrund crater was created during the Ordovician meteor event when a hypothetical large asteroid transferred directly into a resonant orbit with Jupiter, which shifted its orbit to intercept Earth.

This attractive theory may need to be changed as more recent study puts the age of the impact in the Cambrian.

== See also ==
- Ordovician meteor event
- Kärdla crater
- Neugrund breccia
