= Osmussaar Lighthouse =

Lighthouse in Estonia

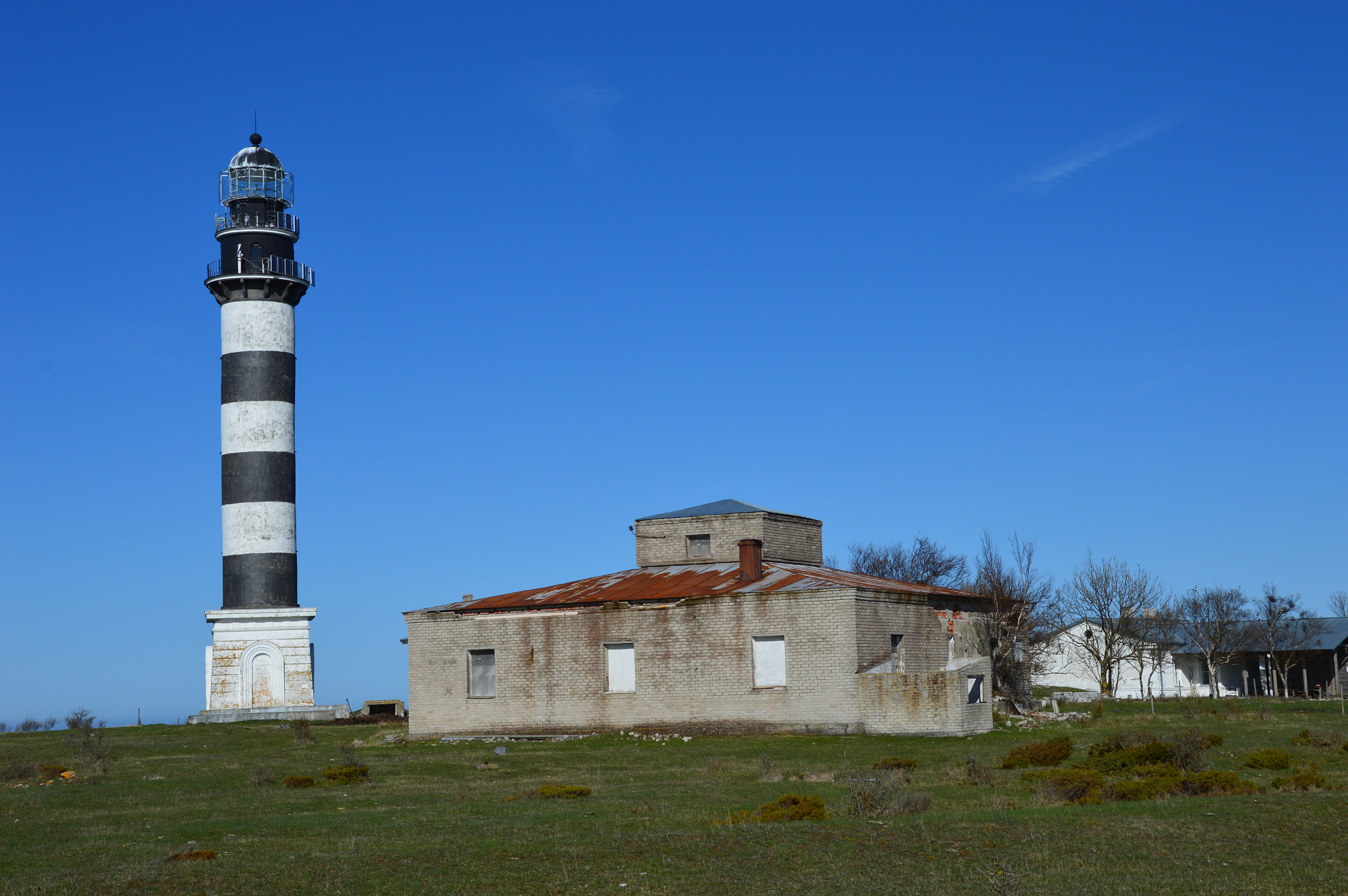
- Lighthouse in 2015
- Location: Osmussaar, Estonia
- Coordinates: 59°18′12.95″N 23°21′40.23″E

Tower
- Constructed: 1765 (first); 1804 (second); 1850 (third)
- Foundation: one-story square prism cement blocks basement
- Construction: concrete
- Automated: 1995
- Height: 115 feet (35 m)
- Shape: cylindrical tower with balcony and lantern
- Markings: white tower with black horizontal bands

Light
- First lit: 1954 (current)
- Focal height: 128 feet (39 m)
- Range: 11 nautical miles (20 km; 13 mi)
- Characteristic: Fl(2) W 18 s.
- Estonia no.: EVA 425

Osmussaar Lighthouse (Estonian: Osmussaare tuletorn) is a lighthouse on the northwestern peak of Osmussaar.

The lighthouse was built in 1954, is made of reinforced concrete and is 35 meters tall.

== History ==
The first stone beacon on Osmussaar was built in 1765. In 1804 it was elevated and equipped with a lantern room containing a catoptric lighting device with 24 lamps and reflectors. In 1814 the lighthouse collapsed and was replaced by a temporary wooden tower. In 1850 a new stone lighthouse was built and equipped with a dioptric Fresnel lighting device in 1875. In 1902 the lighthouse became powered by electricity. The lighthouse was blown up by the Soviet soldiers before evacuation in 1941.

The current lighthouse was built in 1954 to replace the temporary wooden structure which was erected after the war.

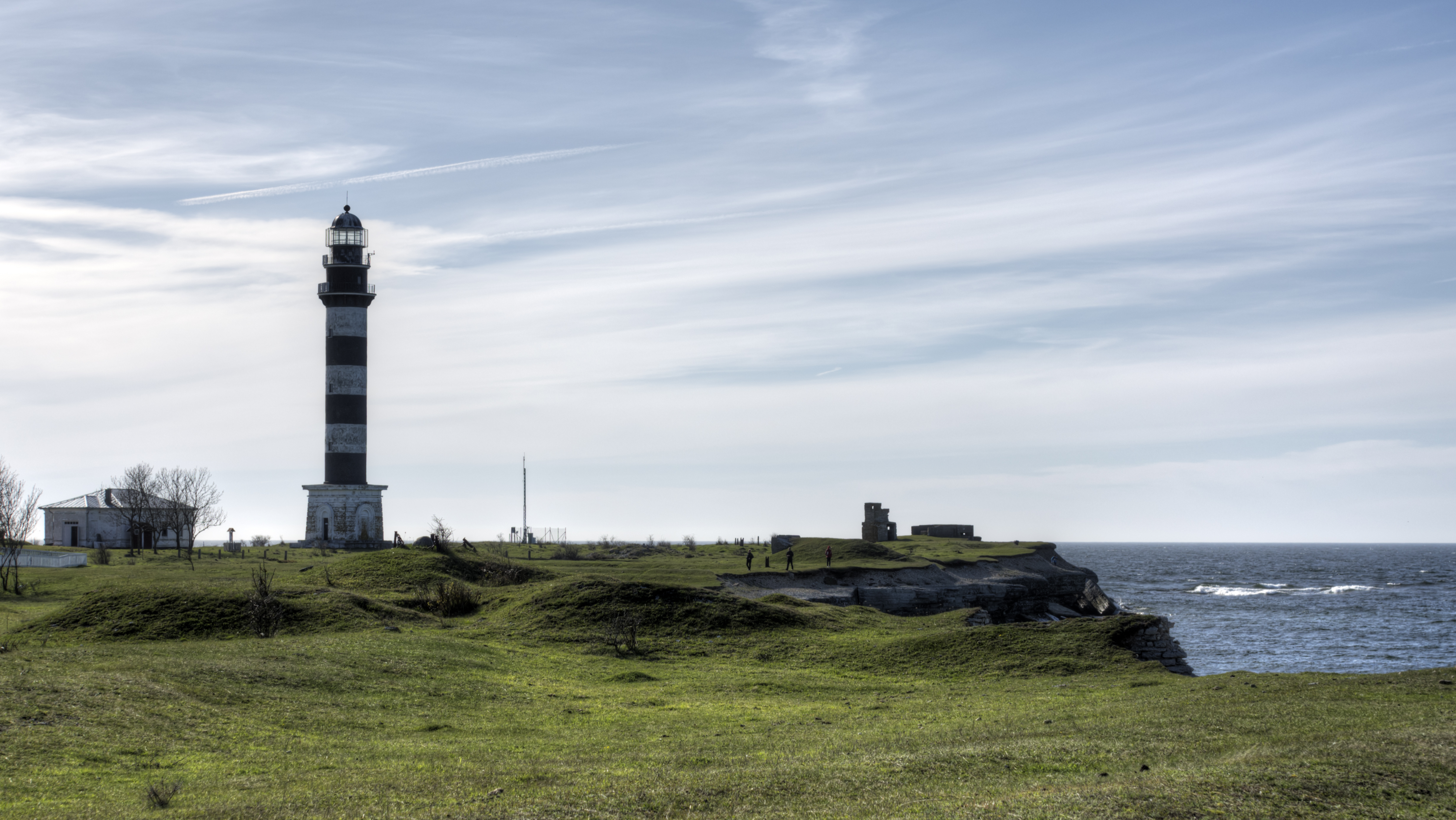
Osmussaar lighthouse

== See also ==
- List of lighthouses in Estonia
