= Neugrund breccia =

Type of meteorite-related rock

Neugrund breccia is a type of rock consisting of gneissic breccia and amphibolite originating from the Neugrund crater. Neugrund breccia is different from Ordovician breccia, which is found in a similar region but was formed millions of years later after a different meteor strike.

Neugrund breccia formed during the cementation of meteor fragments. Glacial action distributed erratics of breccia throughout an area of over 10,000 km^{2} surrounding the impact site. Boulders of Neugrund breccia can be found in north-western Estonia and are especially concentrated around the island of Osmussaar.

The largest known Neugrund breccia formation is Skarvan. It is located near the west coast of Osmussaar.

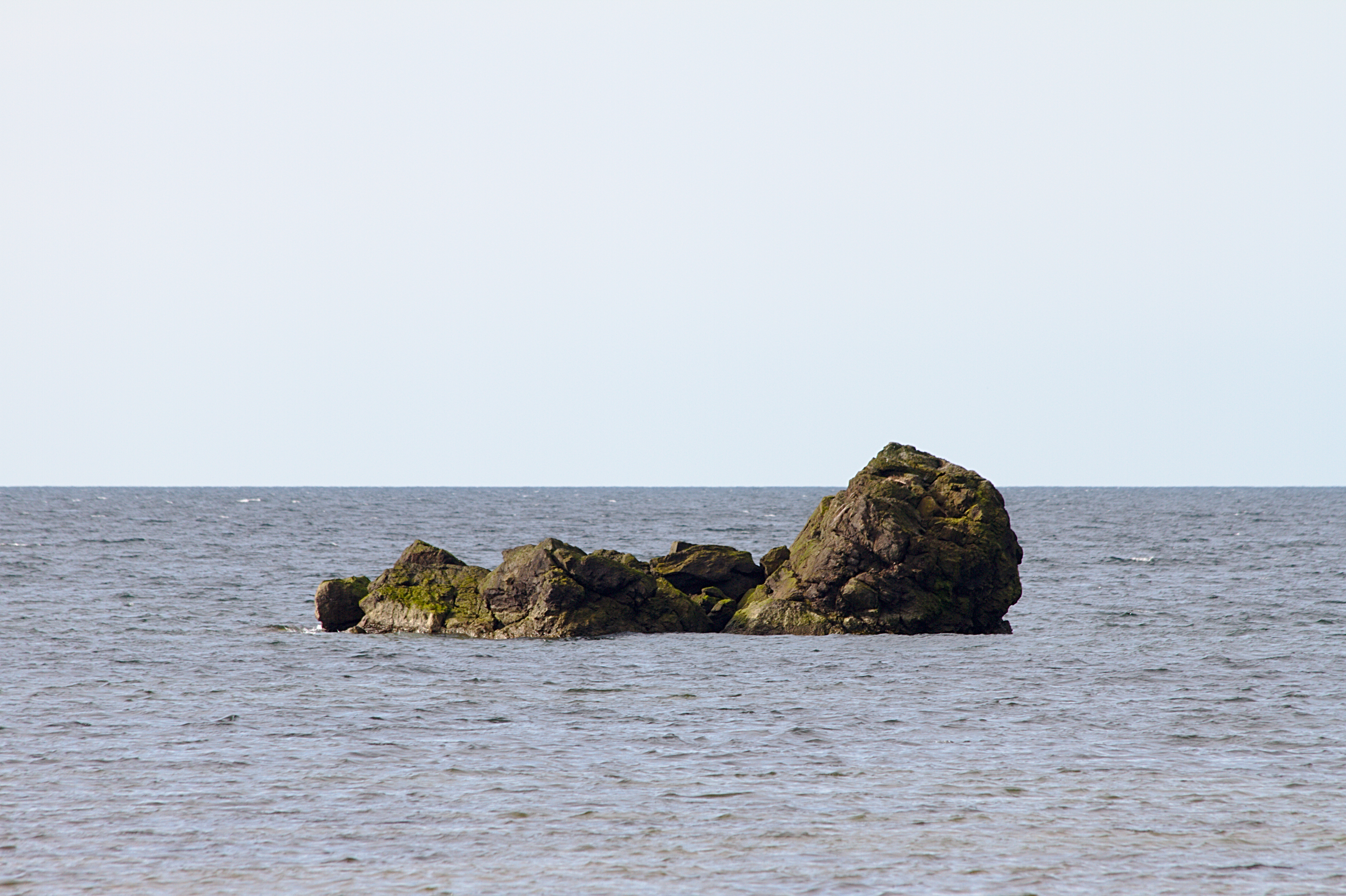
Skarvan

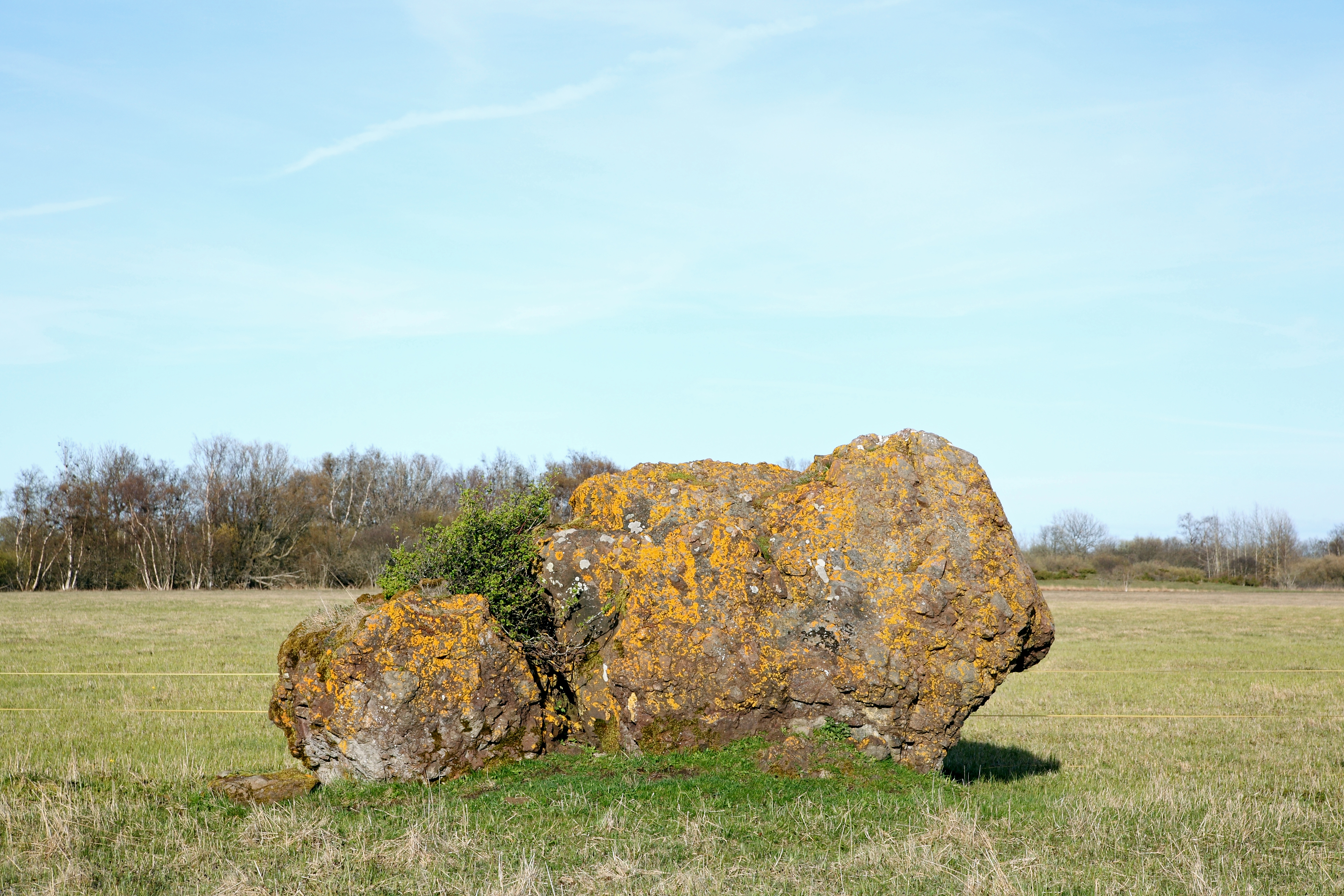

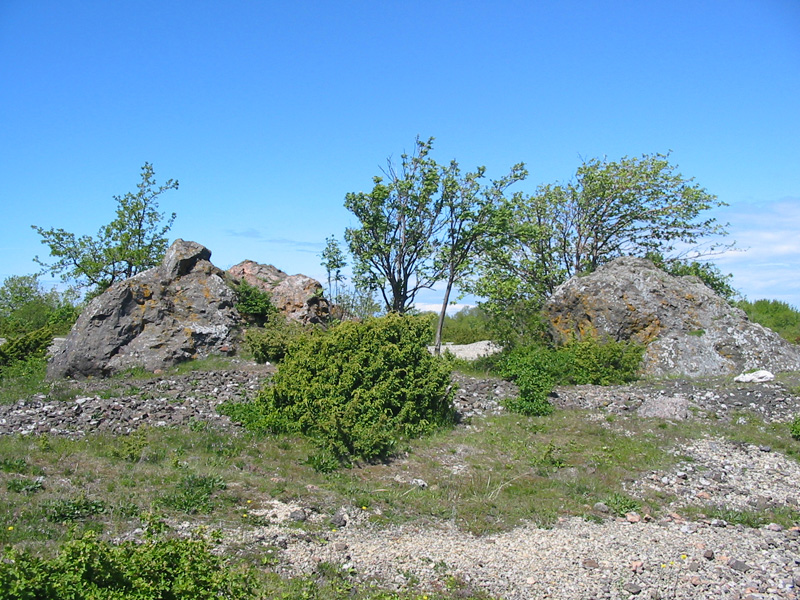

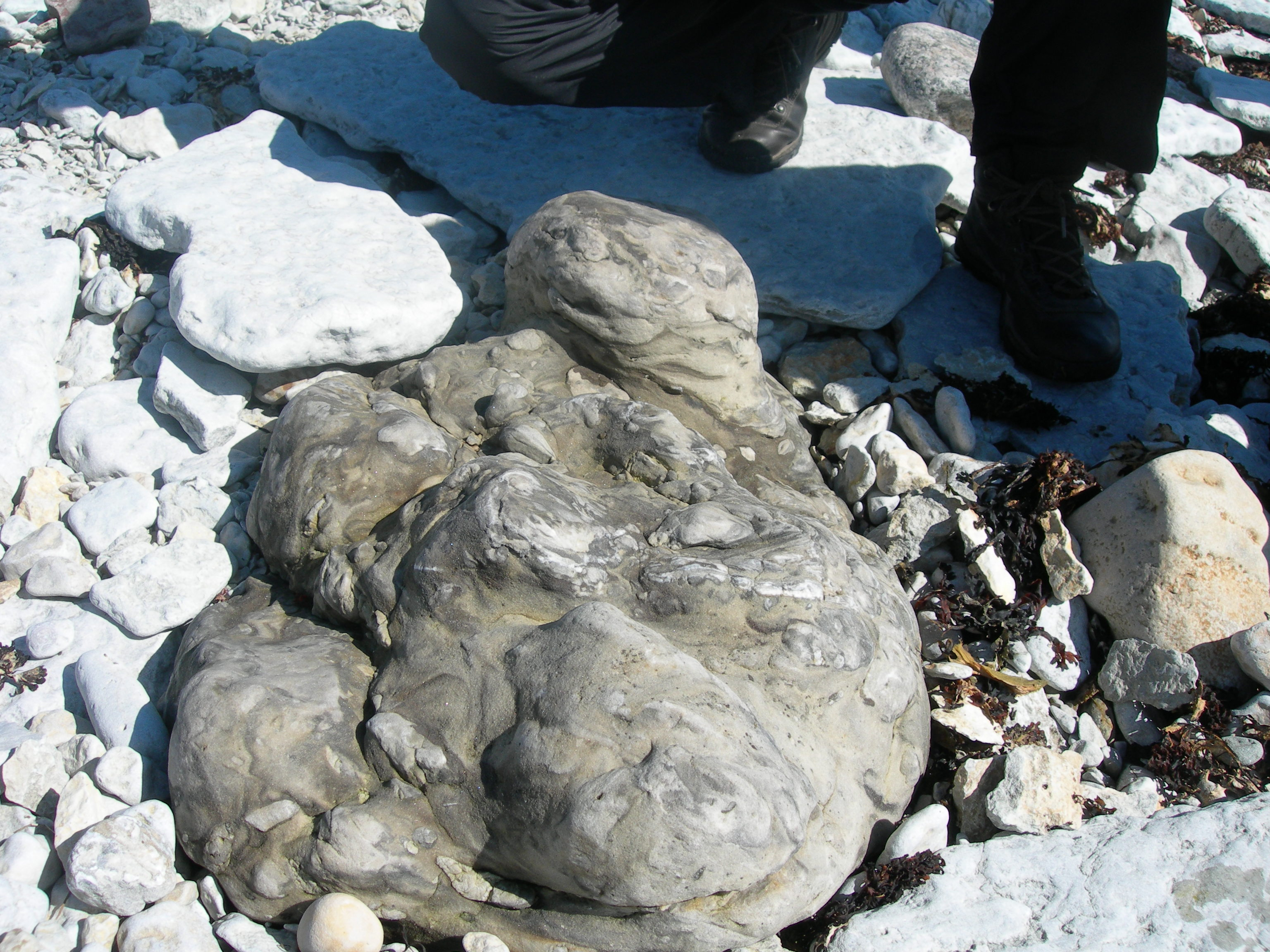

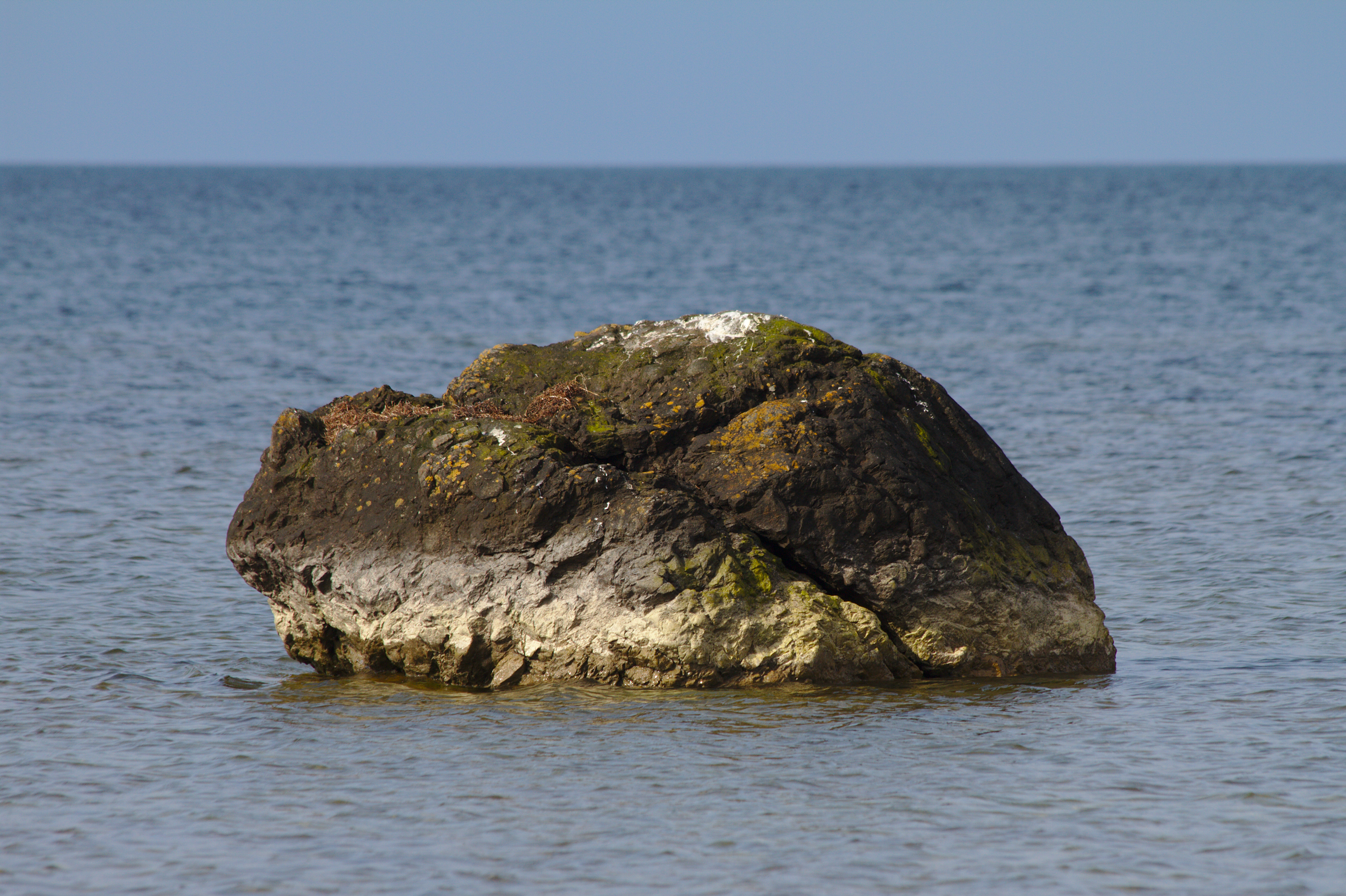
