= Osmussaar =

Island in Estonia

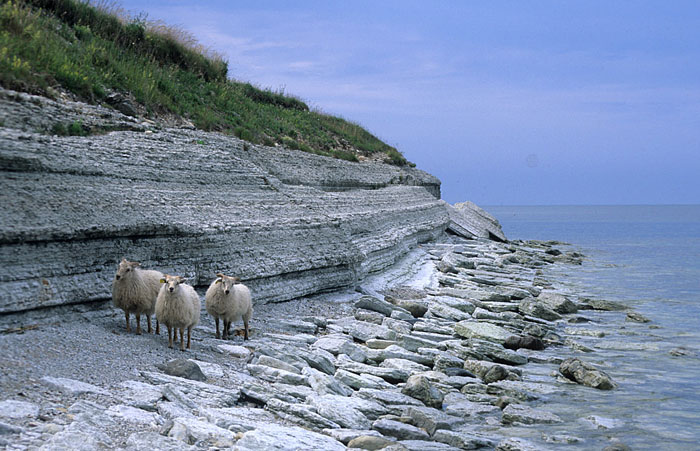
- Limestone cliff on the east coast of Osmussaar

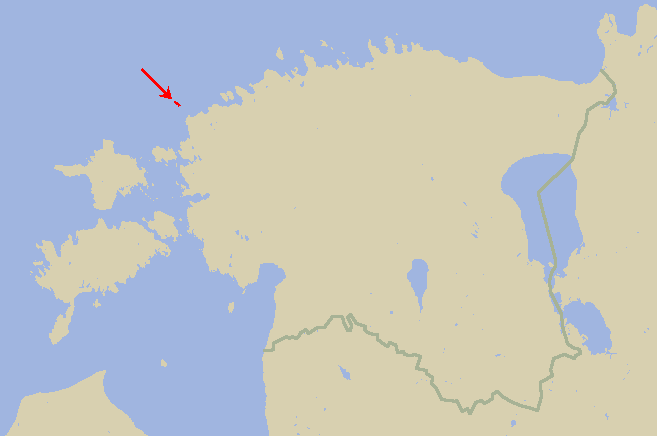

- Location in the Baltic Sea region Location in Estonia Location in Europe

Geography
- Location: Baltic Sea
- Coordinates: 59°17′30″N 23°23′30″E
- Area: 4.8 km^{2} (1.9 sq mi)
- Length: 4.6 km (2.86 mi)
- Width: 1.3 km (0.81 mi)
- Coastline: 14 km (8.7 mi)

Administration
- Estonia
- County: Lääne County
- Municipality: Lääne-Nigula Parish

Demographics
- Population: 4 (2013)

Osmussaar (Swedish: Odensholm, German: Odinsholm) is an Estonian island situated in the mouth of the Gulf of Finland in the Baltic Sea, 7.5 km off the Estonian mainland. Administratively the island is part of Lääne-Nigula Parish in Lääne County. Its area is 4.8 km^{2} (1,200 acres).

Before the Soviet Union occupied Estonia during World War II, around 130 people, mainly Estonian Swedes, lived on the island. The continuous settlement of Swedes on Osmussaar had dated back for centuries. Currently Osmussaar has only two permanent inhabitants and the island is a nature reserve. Administratively, the entire island of Osmussaar belongs to the village Osmussaare.

== Name ==
The island's Swedish name Odensholm (or Odinsholm) derives from the Vikings' chief god, Odin, who, according to a legend, is buried on the island. The origin of the Estonian name Osmussaar is not clear.

== History ==
The continuous settlement of Estonian Swedes on Osmussaar, which lasted until World War II, goes back at least to the 14th century, though little is known of the island's history before the 18th century. The exact time of colonisation is also unknown and the island was possibly inhabited already in the Viking Age. The island's population varied considerably with time, for example the plague epidemic of 1710 left according to popular stories only a few people alive. In the 20th century the island's population continued to rise and was the highest at the beginning of the 1930s. During the Estonian census of 1934 131 people lived on Osmussaar, all of them Swedes except for the lighthouse keeper and his family.

In 1765 the first lighthouse was built on the northern coast of Osmussaar. In 1850 it was replaced with a new one, which was demolished in 1941 by the retreating Soviet garrison. The current lighthouse was completed in 1954.

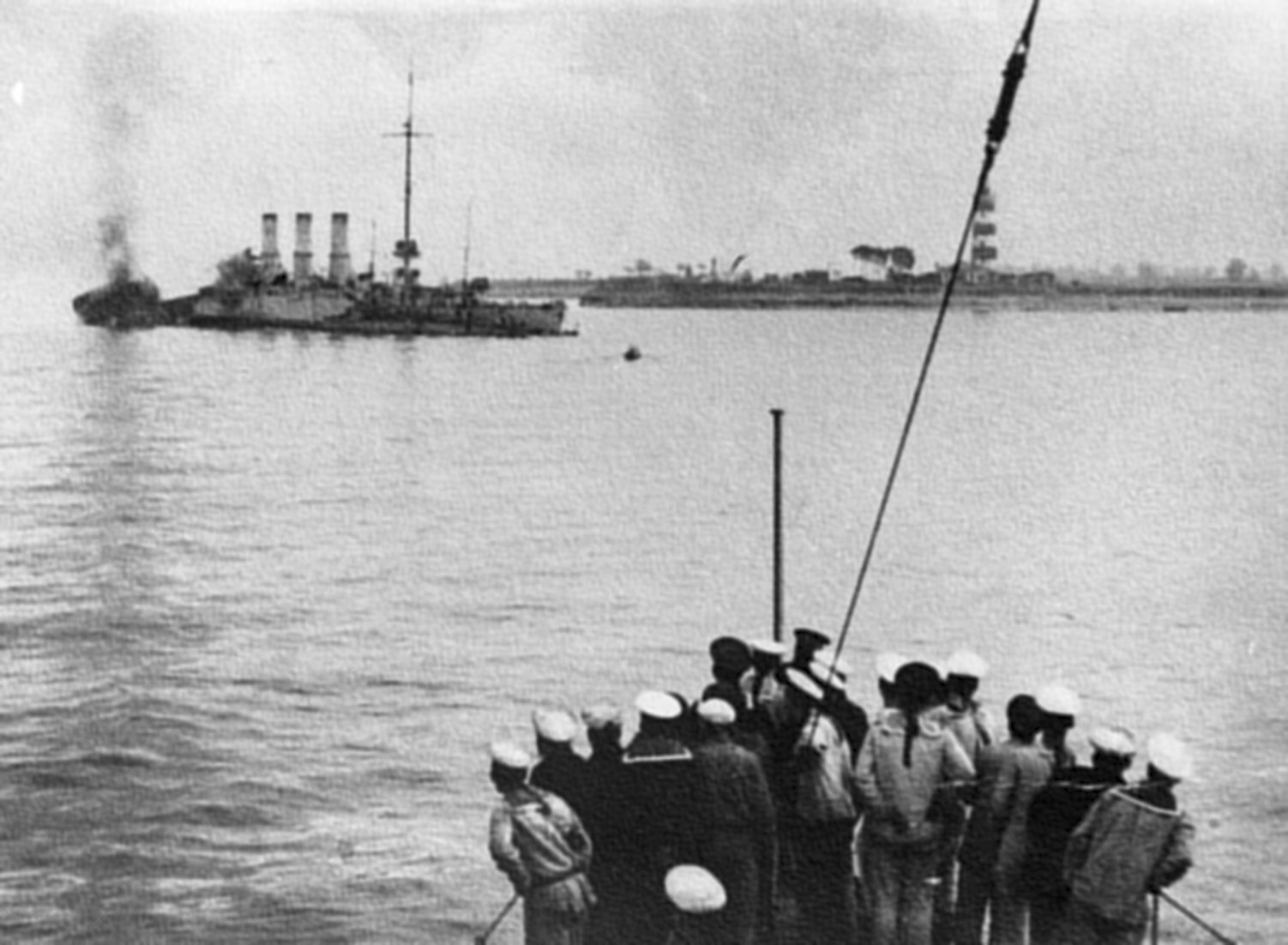
SMS Magdeburg, after having run aground, with the lighthouse of Osmussaar in the background.

In 1914, during World War I, the German light cruiser Magdeburg ran aground and sank near the northern tip of Osmussaar.

All inhabitants of Osmussaar were forced to leave the island during World War II. On 12 June 1940 the islanders were evacuated to Vormsi as the island was set aside as a Soviet military base. The next year Osmussaar was the last foothold in Estonia that was given up by the Red Army to the advancing German army. In 1942, during the Occupation of Estonia by Nazi Germany, the islanders could return to their homes, but the approaching Red Army forced them soon to leave permanently. The last 46 people left for Sweden in February 1944.

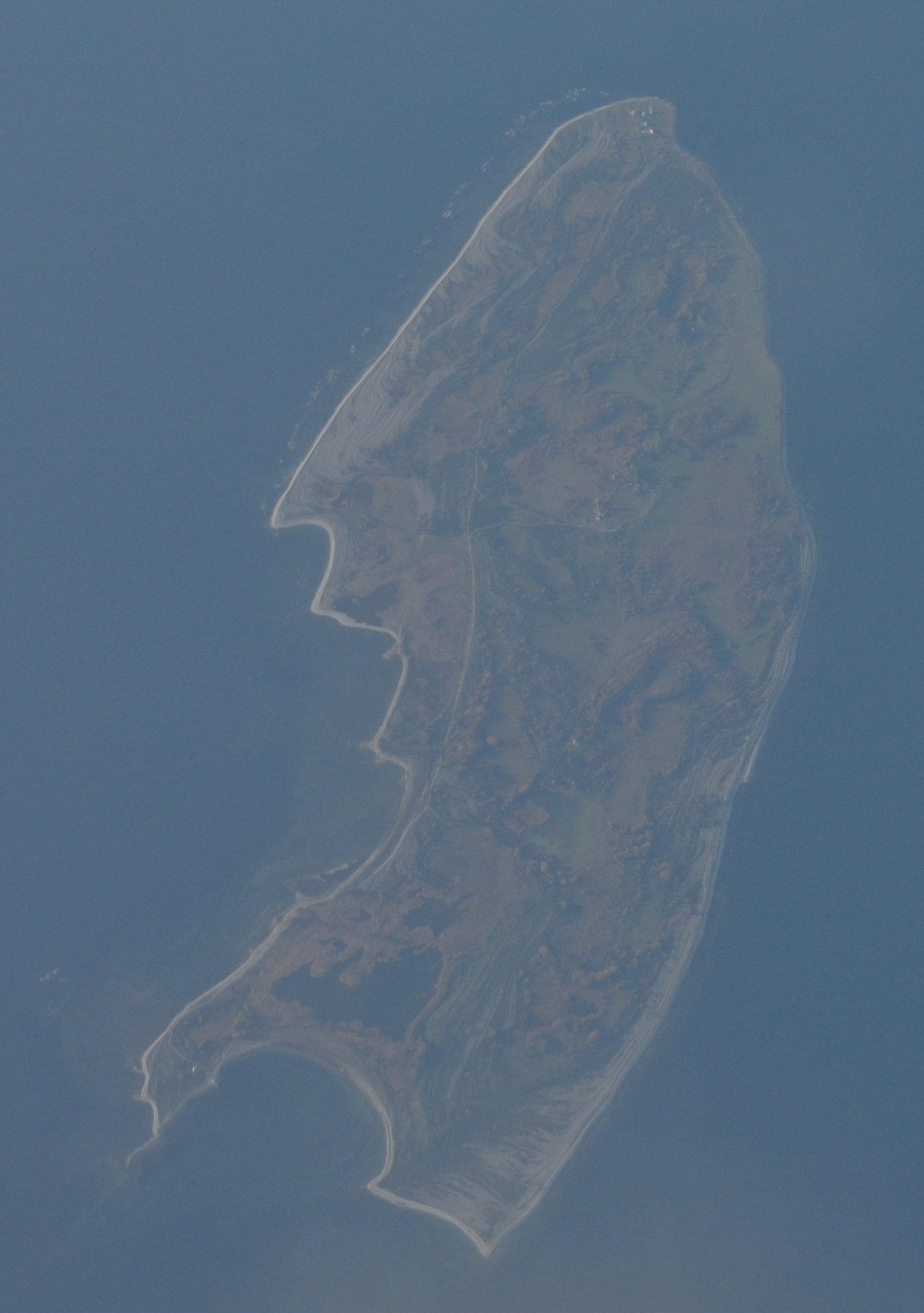
Osmussaar shot from 40,000 feet.

According to the Moscow intermediate peace treaty between Finland and the Soviet Union starting 19 September 1944 (Article 17), Finland was obliged to hand over all commercial vessels for the use of the Allies. In late September 1944, the Soviet Union ordered 50 galeas and 50 motor boats to be delivered with Finnish crews to Osmussaar on 2 October 1944. This Finnish navy unit on the Soviet service was called detachment Arho after its commander, Olavi Arho. Its chief was Lieutenant Commander Paul Hongisto. The galeas and motor boats were taken into the state service involuntarily, but the crews were offered voluntary pay of 250 Finnish marks per day. From 2–8 October, 50 galeas towed one motor boat to Estonia with a ten-day food supply for the crews. Detachment Arho served the Soviet military logistics on Hiiumaa and Saaremaa establishing connections to Tallinn. Every galeas had a captain, chief machine operator and two other crew members. The motor boats had two member crew. In Estonia all the military badges were removed from uniforms and the detachment acted like a civilian one. Also any marks of the Finnish nationality like the flags were removed.

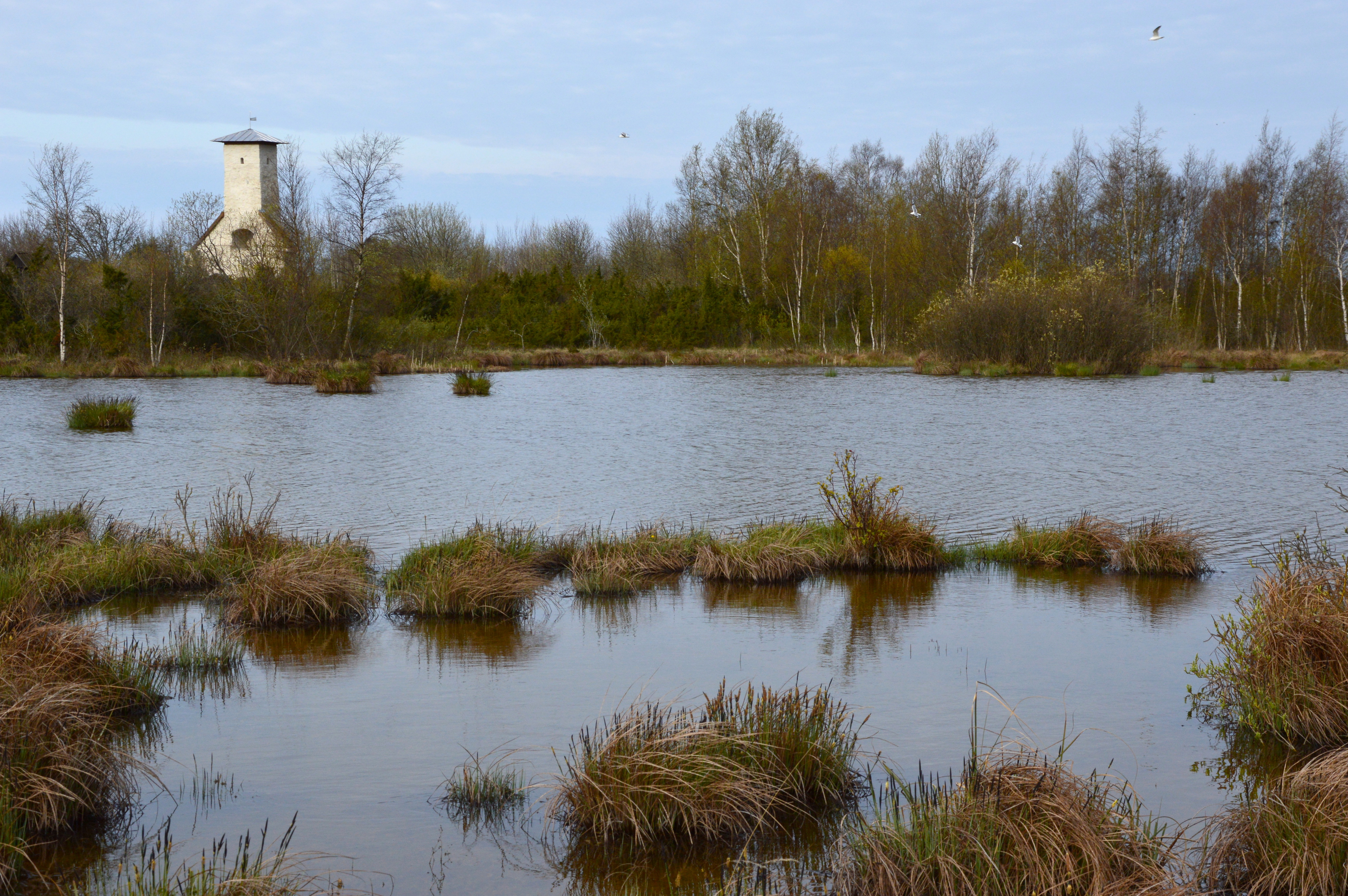
Kappelkärre Lake and chapel ruins.

From Osmussaar many vessels sailed to Rohuküla of Haapsalu to support the Moonsund Landing Operation on the occupied Hiiumaa and Saaremaa islands. On 4 October the Finnish galeas shipped Soviet soldiers, horses and cannons to Heltermaa of Hiiumaa. Every galeas shipped about one Soviet infantry company. The same day later, the Finnish vessels were ordered to Saarenmaa proper, where the Germans had retreated from Muhu. On 5 October 1944, two Soviet detachments and two brigades were shipped to Taaliku and Triigi.

The last galeases and motor boats came back to Finland on 7 November 1945. Nine of the fifty galeases were lost at sea due to rough water; additionally, seven were destroyed during the war. In total, sixteen galeases were destroyed or lost. Also one galeas more, Greta I, had disappeared either on 4 or 5 October on its way to Osmussaar. On 16 October the German submarine, U-481, sank the galeases Endla, Dan and Maria with its gun fire and ramming them. On 25 October U-958 sank the galeas Linnea with a torpedo. Eight Finnish soldiers were killed in these operations with the galeases. The other German attacks were not successful. Of all the 50 motorboats were lost 22, but without the loss of the human lives. The vessels of the detachment Arho were returned to Finland to Hanko and 2 November 1944, the headquarters of the Finnish navy ordered the liquidation of the unit. The crews were released from service and the vessels were returned to their civilian owners.

Some navy activities were undertaken on the waters near Osmussaar as late as 1945. One German submarine, U-745 was destroyed by a sea mine, 4 February 1945 and later U-676 for the same reason, 19 February 1945.

During the Soviet occupation the island was used by the Soviet Navy. Originally there were plans to house on the island a unit consisting of up to 1200 men, but the large unit was probably disbanded already in 1947 and later the island was home to a small navy unit consisting of a maximum of 40 men.

After Estonia regained independence, the military left in 1993, leaving behind ruins of different fortifications and military buildings. During the property reform the pre-1940 landowners of Osmussaar were not allowed to directly reclaim their land and property, because a cadastral survey had never been conducted on the island and until the Swedes left during World War II, land ownership had been based on old customs. After the departure of Soviet army Osmussaar was uninhabited until 2001, when 2 people moved to the island.

In 1996, the Osmussaar Landscape Protection Area, covering the whole island, was formed for the protection of local geological formations, plant communities and bird fauna.

=== Gallery ===
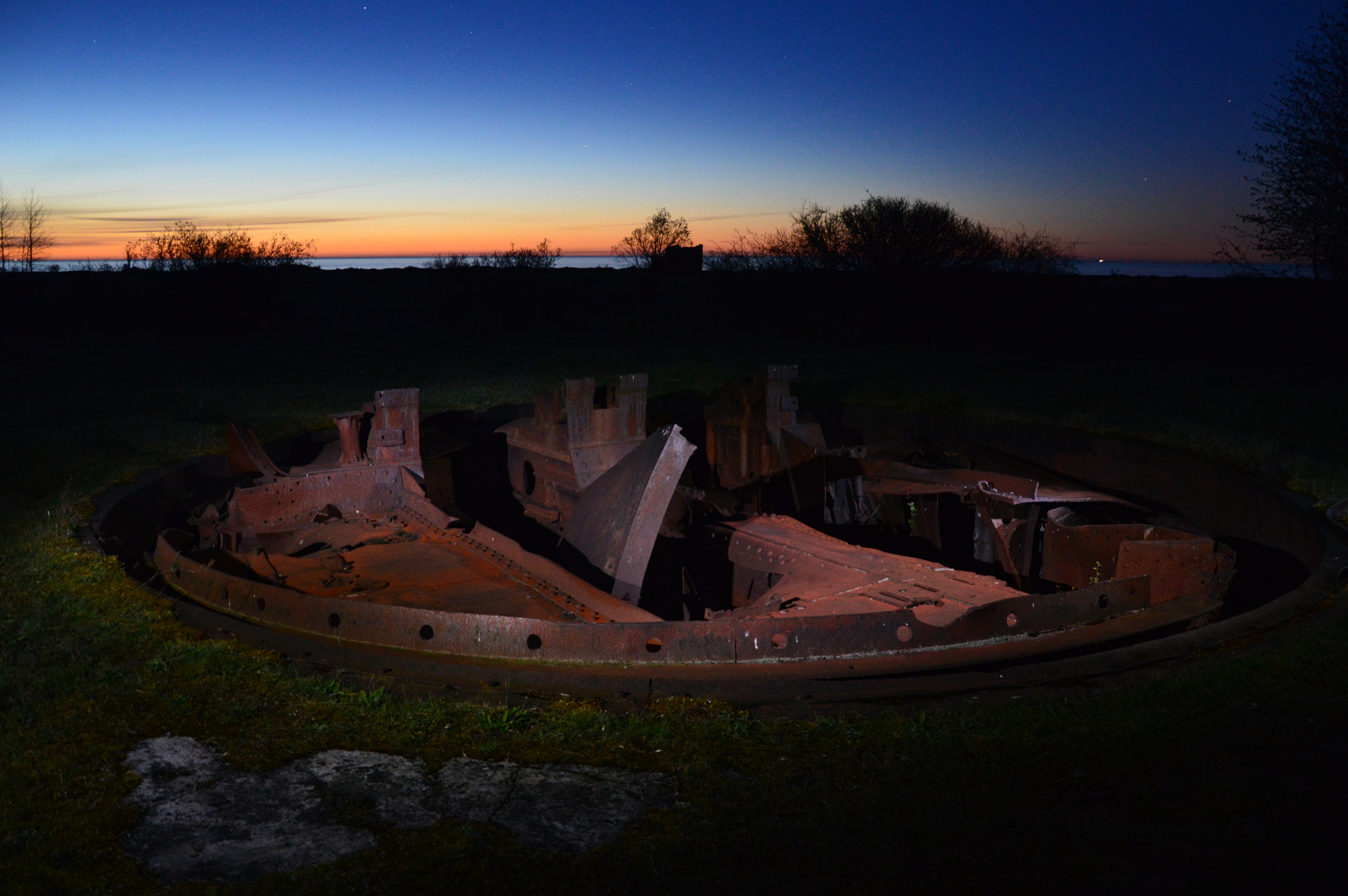
Remains of an MB-2-180 cannon.

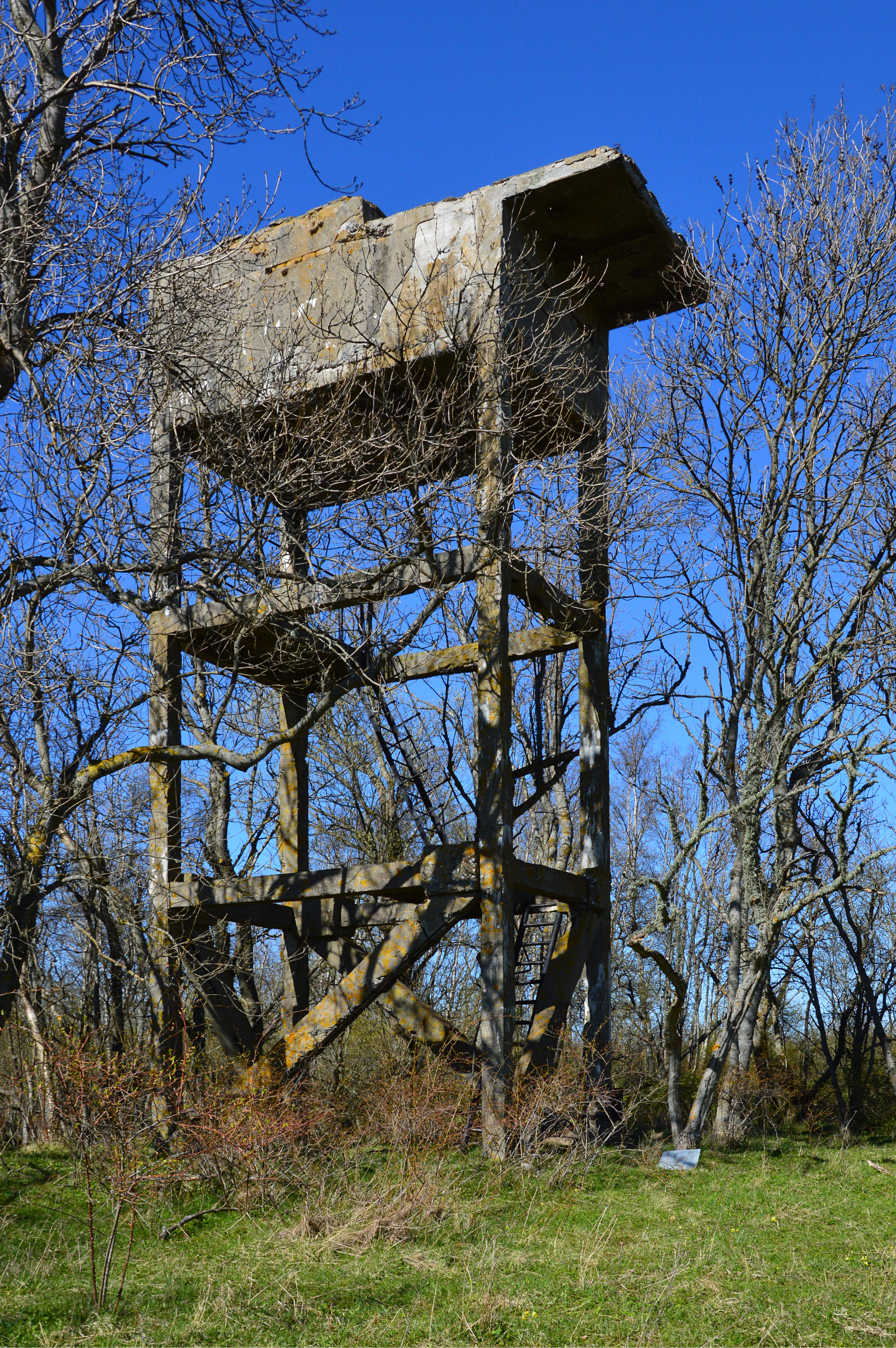
Viewing post.

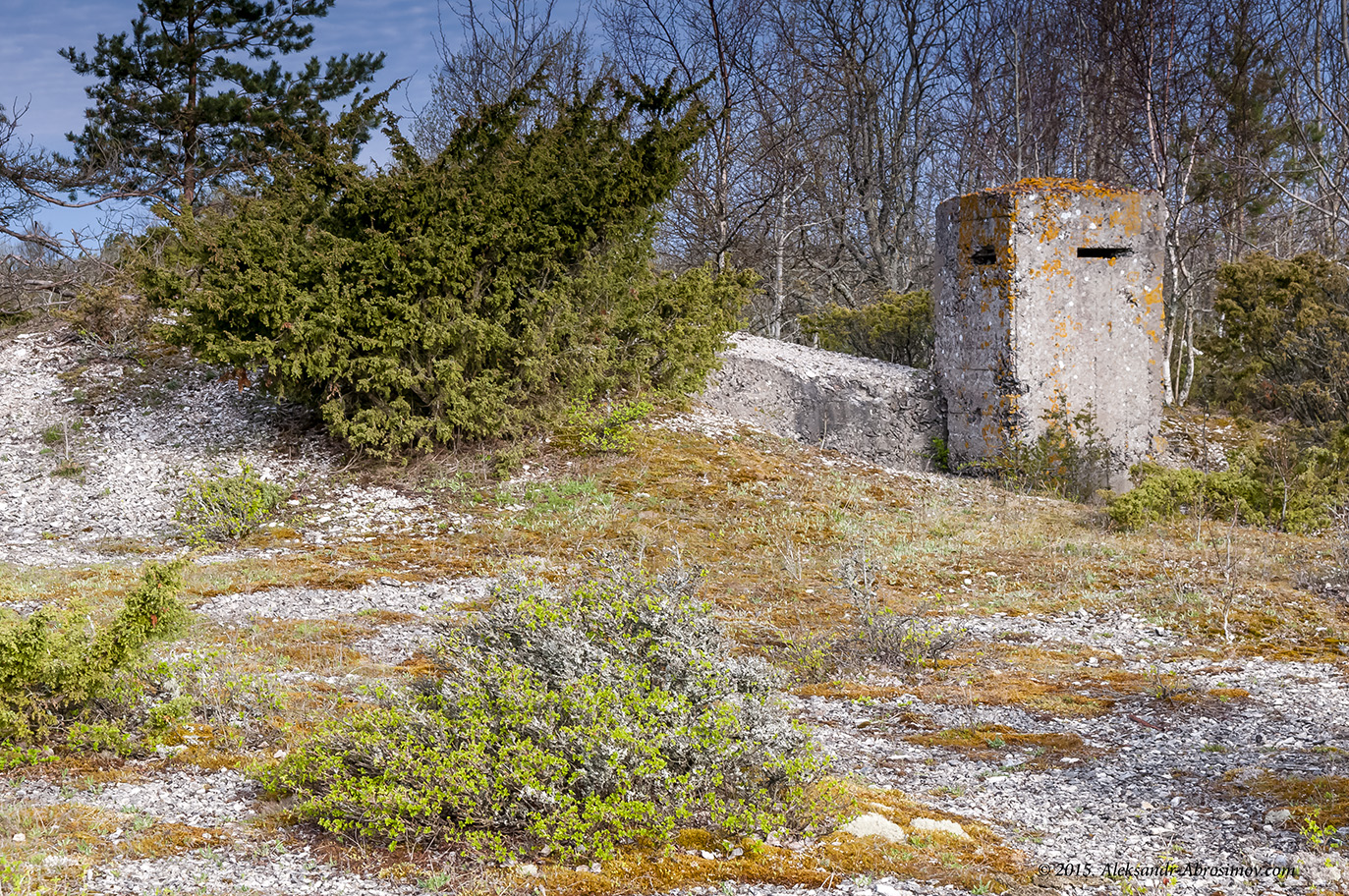
Old military post.

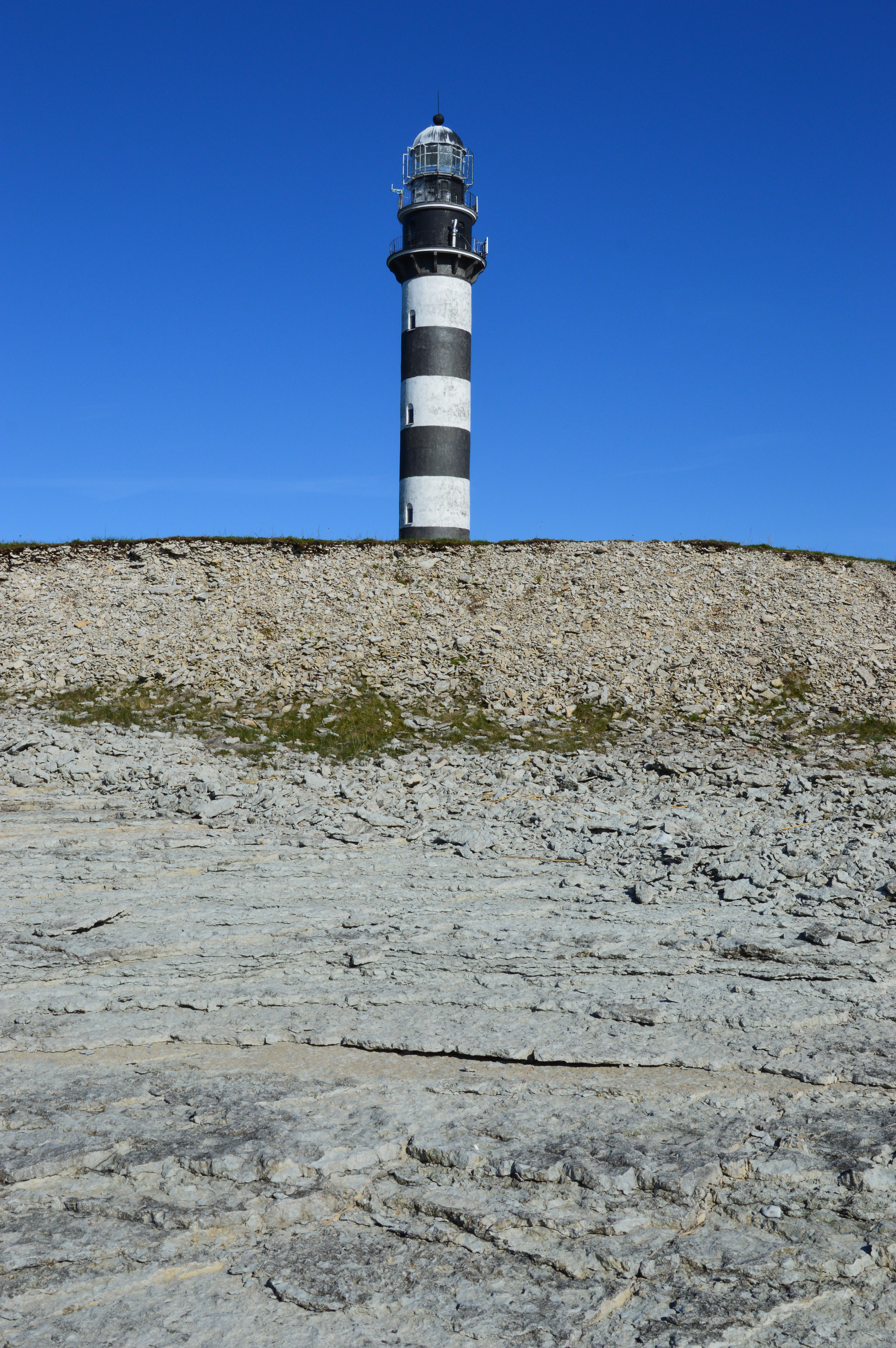
Lighthouse of Osmussaar.

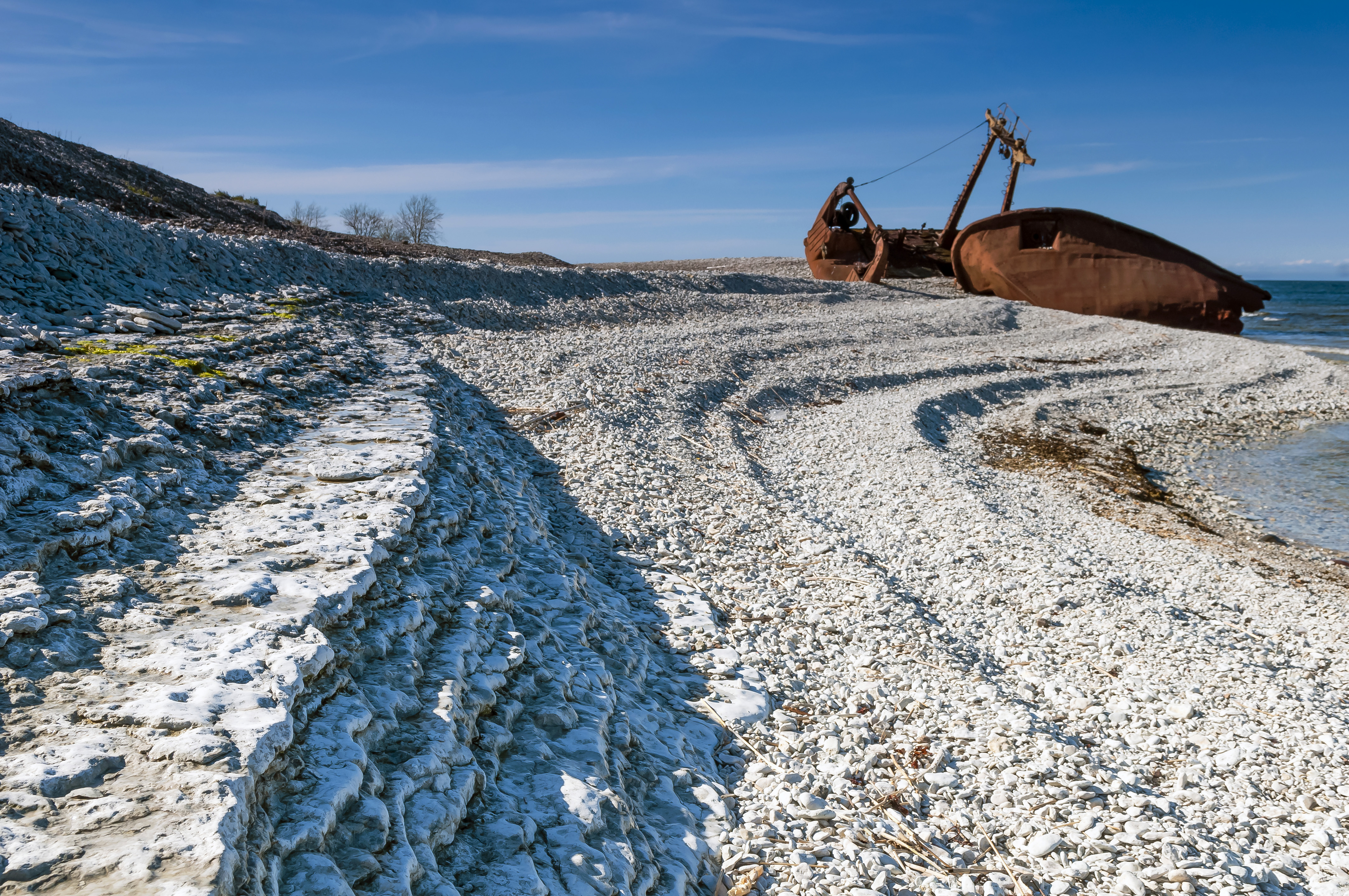
Shipwreck.

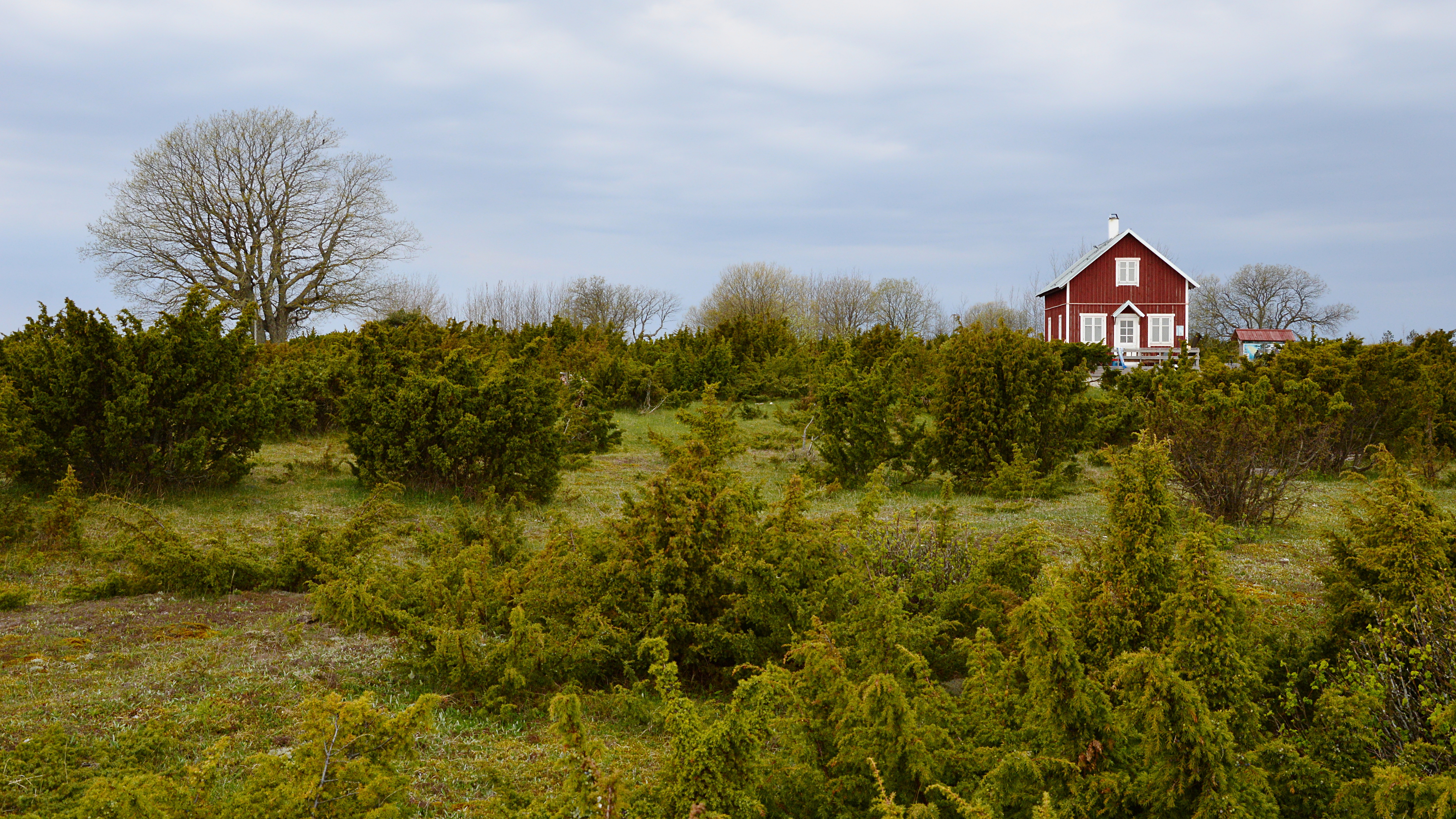
Building in the harbor area.

== Geography and geology ==
Osmussaar is the 14th largest island in Estonia. The island is 4.6 km long and 1.3 km wide, with its longer axis in a northwest–southeast direction. The island is located in the mouth of the Gulf of Finland and the Hanko-Osmussaar line is considered the border of the gulf. The highest elevation of the island is 8 m.

Osmussaar is the westernmost point before Öland where the Baltic Klint emerges from the Baltic Sea. Essentially Osmussaar is a relict island of the klint. The height of the cliff on the island's north and east coast is up to 6 meters, but compared to the surrounding seabed, the height of the island is 60 meters. The island has a relatively thin (up to 2 m) cover of Quaternary marine sediments overlying the Ordovician limestone bedrock. The island arose from the sea 2000–3000 years ago, the uplift continues at a rate of about 3 mm/year. Extensive shingle fields, consisting of limestone pebbles, have developed on the western coast of the island. A number of large erratic boulders can be found scattered on the island. Their diameter reaches 10–20 meters, but more remarkable is their petrological composition – a relatively unique type of breccia (Neugrund breccia), which formed in the course of the impact that created the Neugrund crater.

The most powerful recorded earthquake in Estonia, measuring 4.7 on the Richter magnitude scale, occurred on 25 October 1976 near Osmussaar and is known as the Osmussaar earthquake (Estonian: Osmussaare maavärin). The earthquake caused the collapse of some sections of the cliff on the island's northeast coast and damaged some buildings on the island. The focus of the earthquake was 5–7 km northeast of the island at a depth of 10 or 13 km.

=== Gallery ===
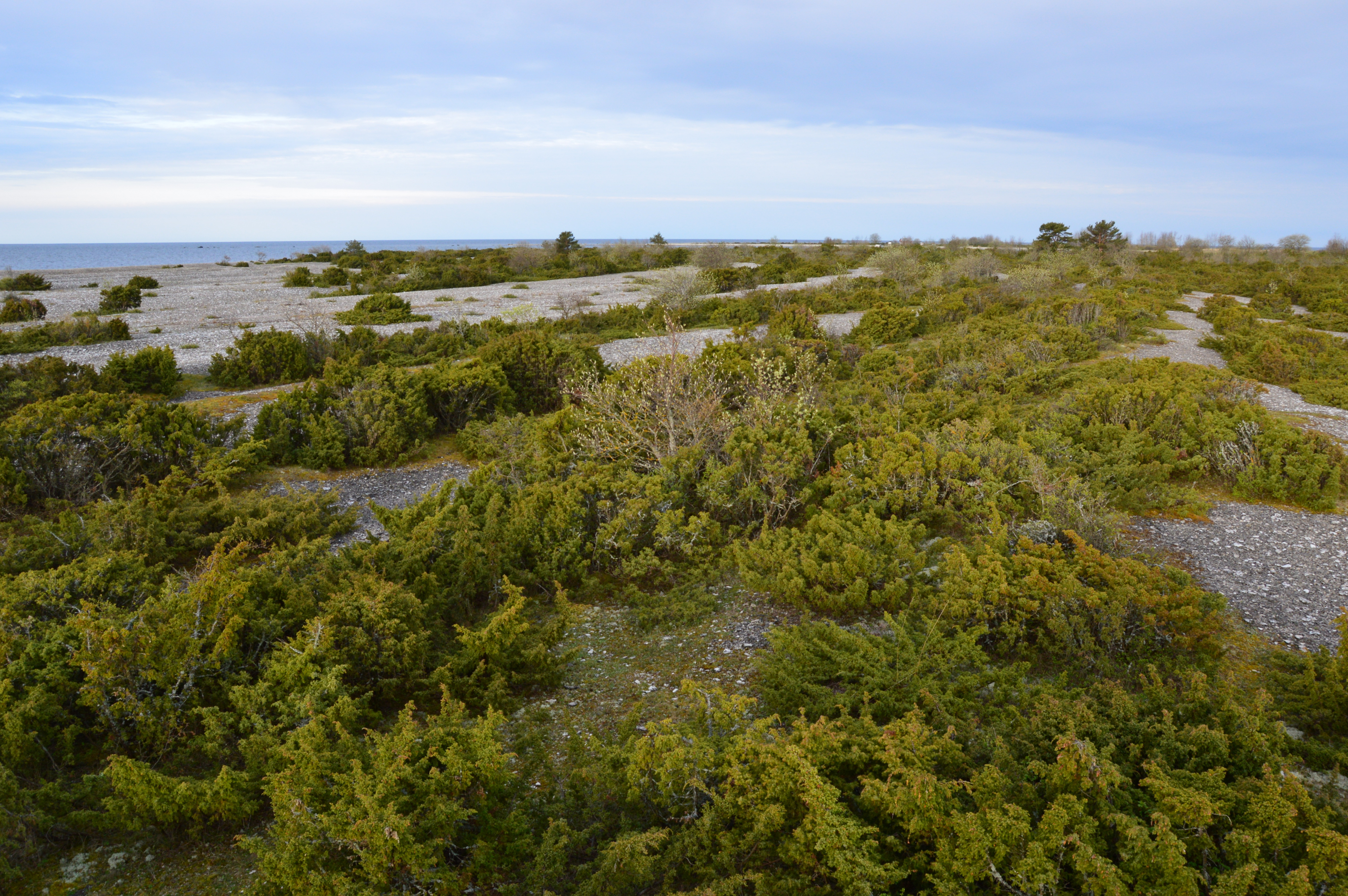
Junipers.

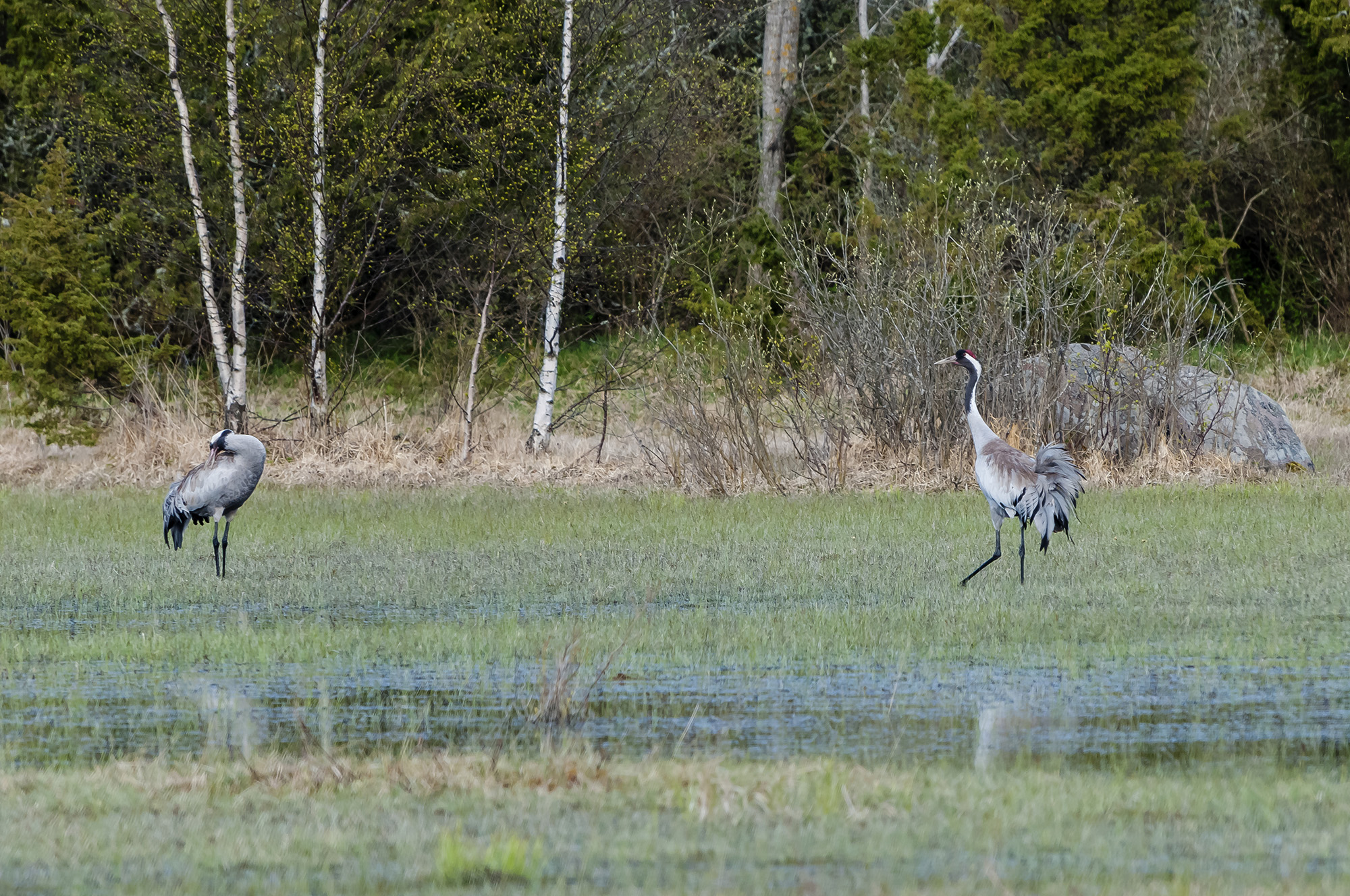
Common cranes.

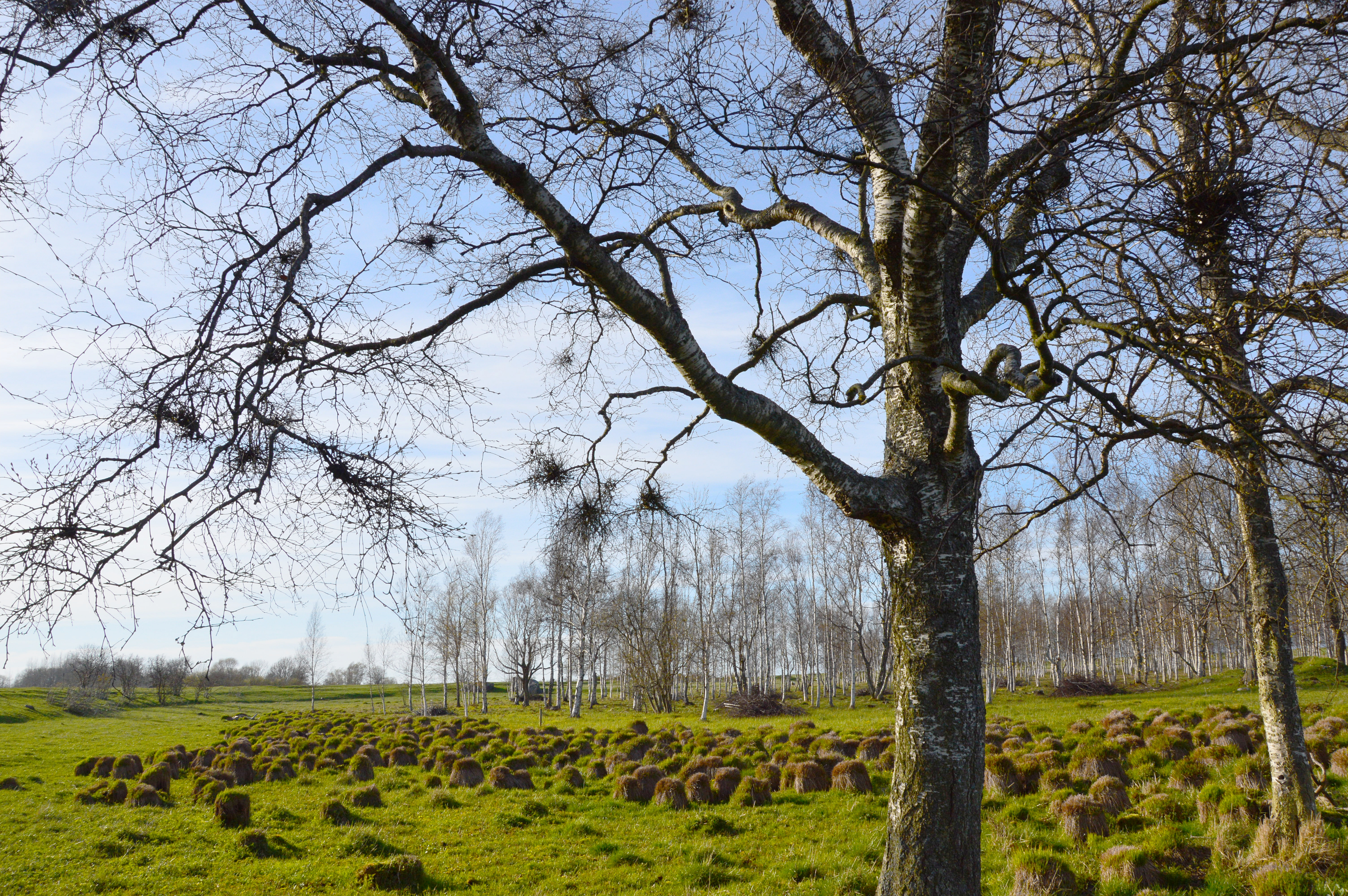
Carex.

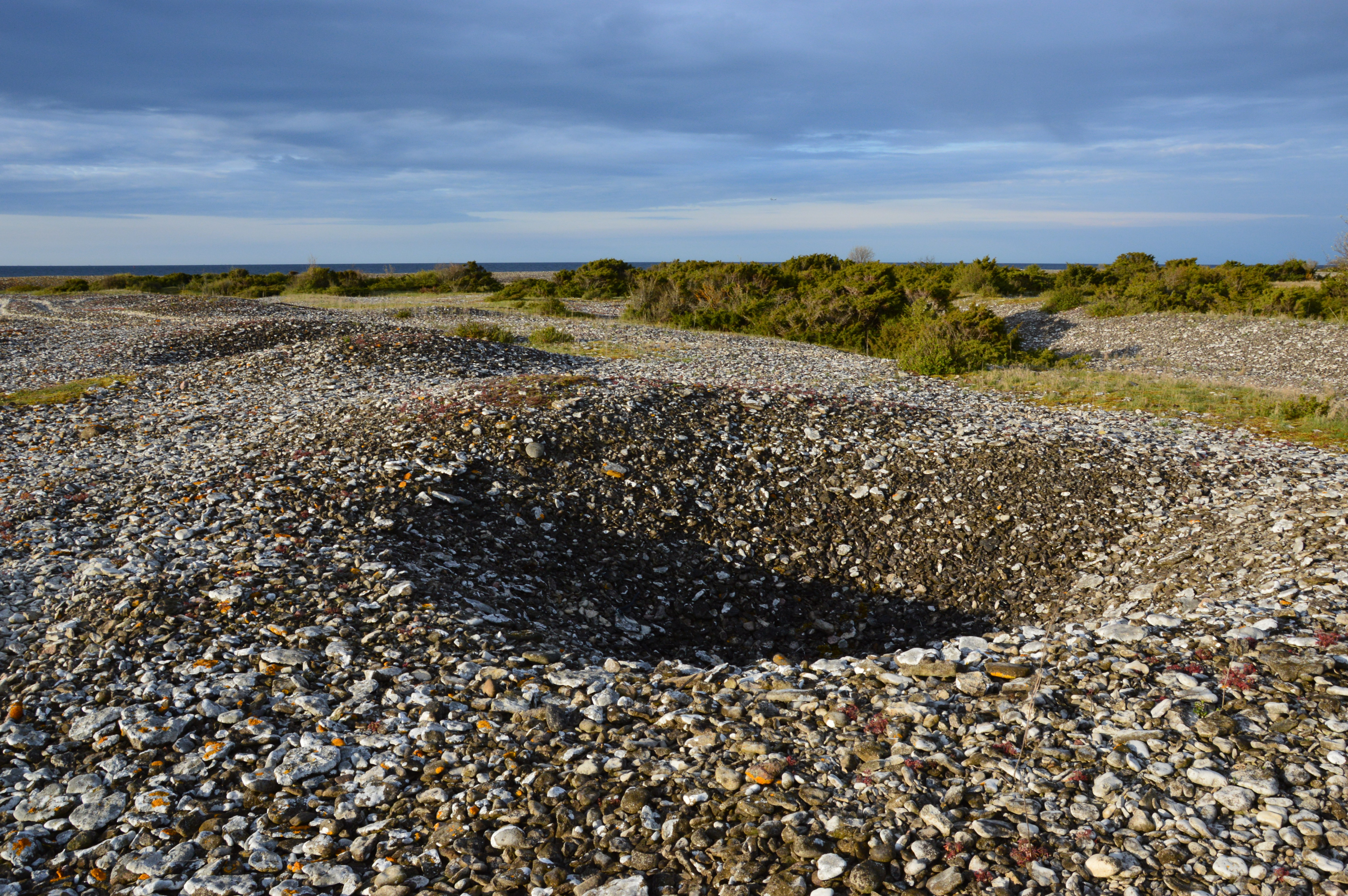
Local landscape.

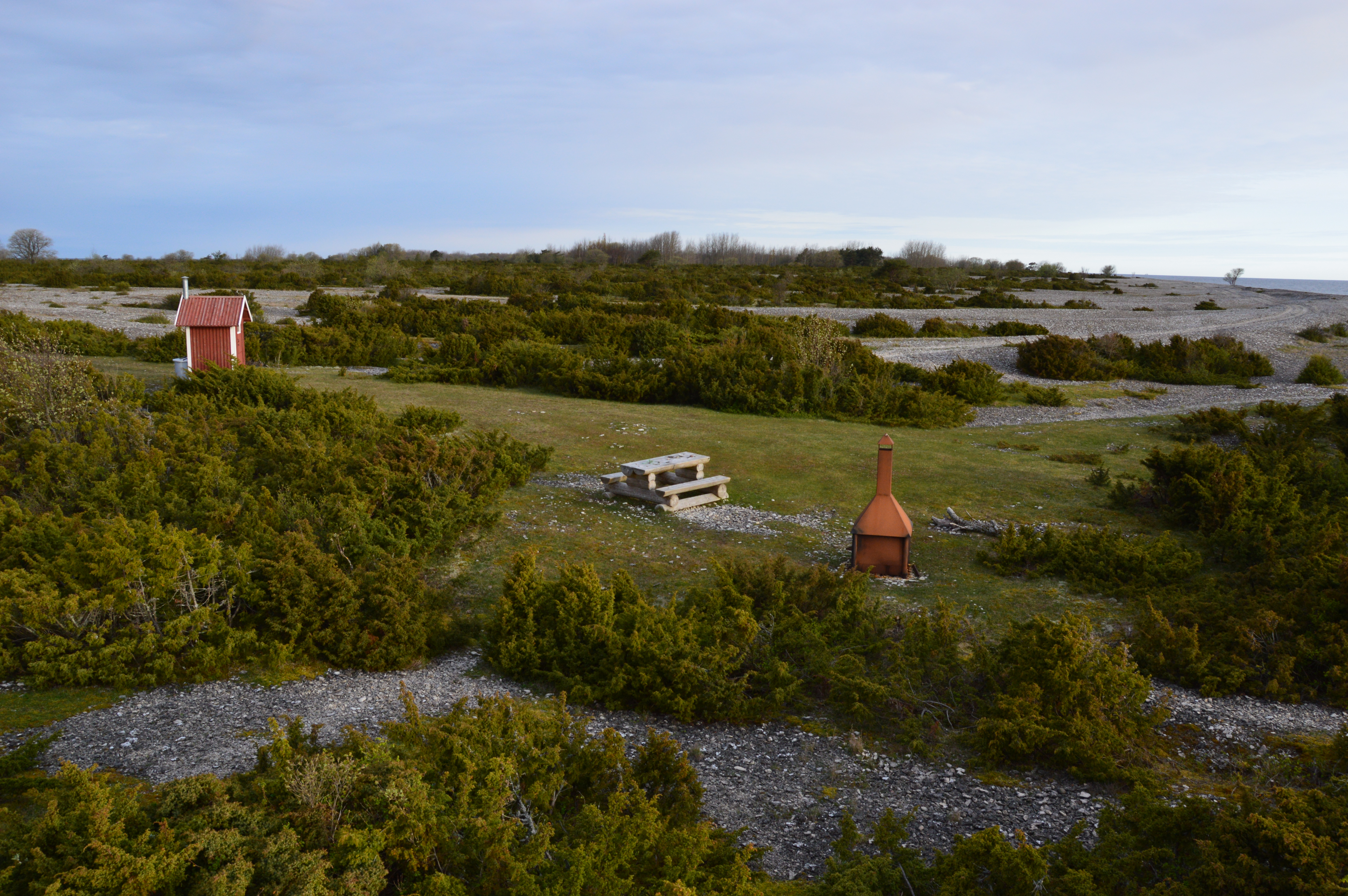
Camping site.

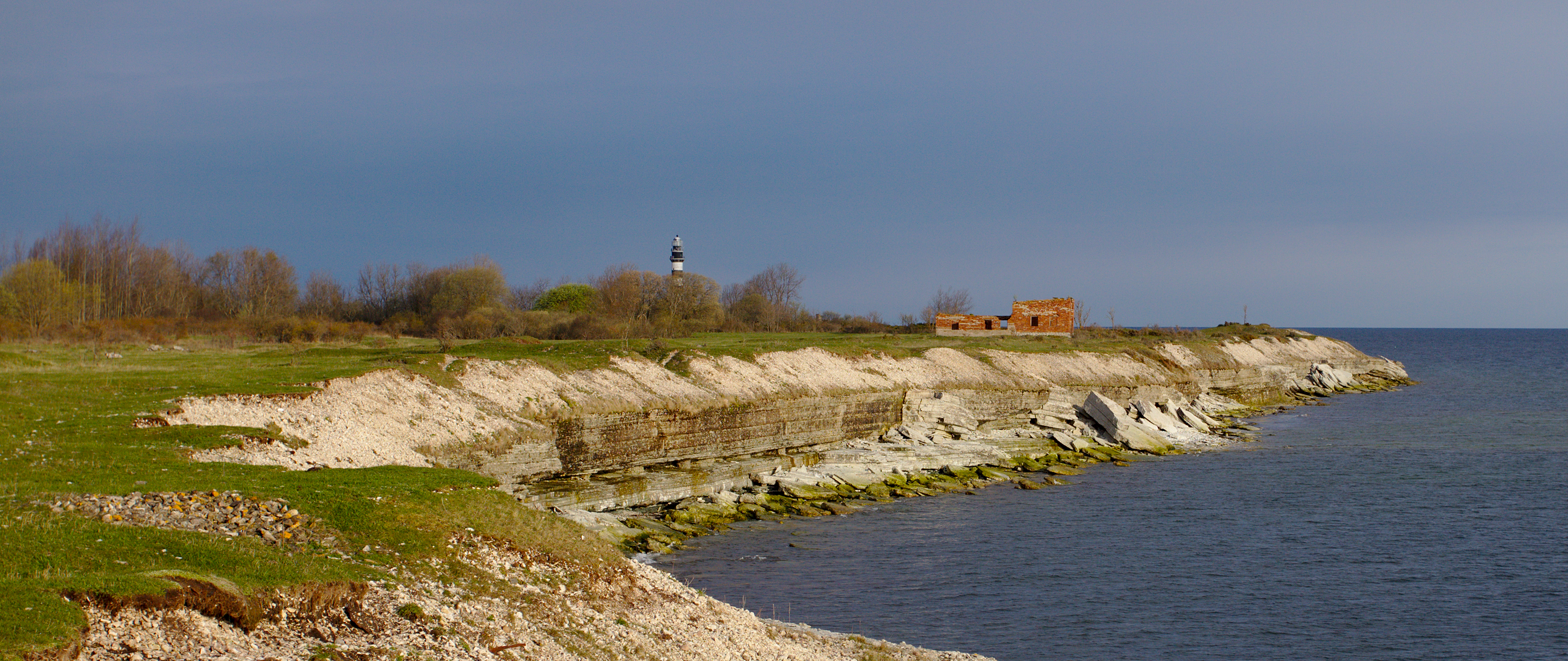
Northeastern coast of Osmussaar.

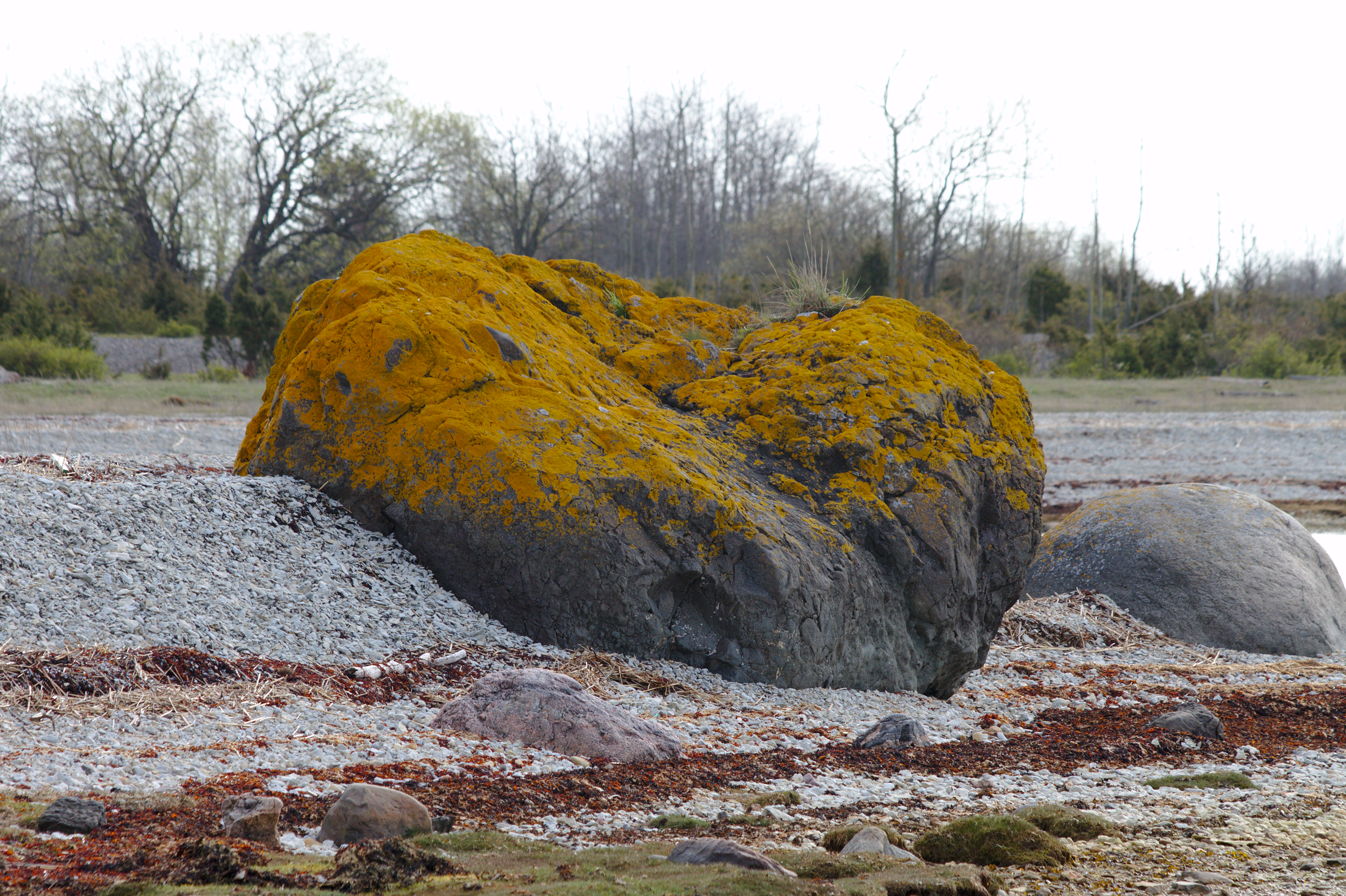
Neugrund breccia.

== Transport and tourism ==
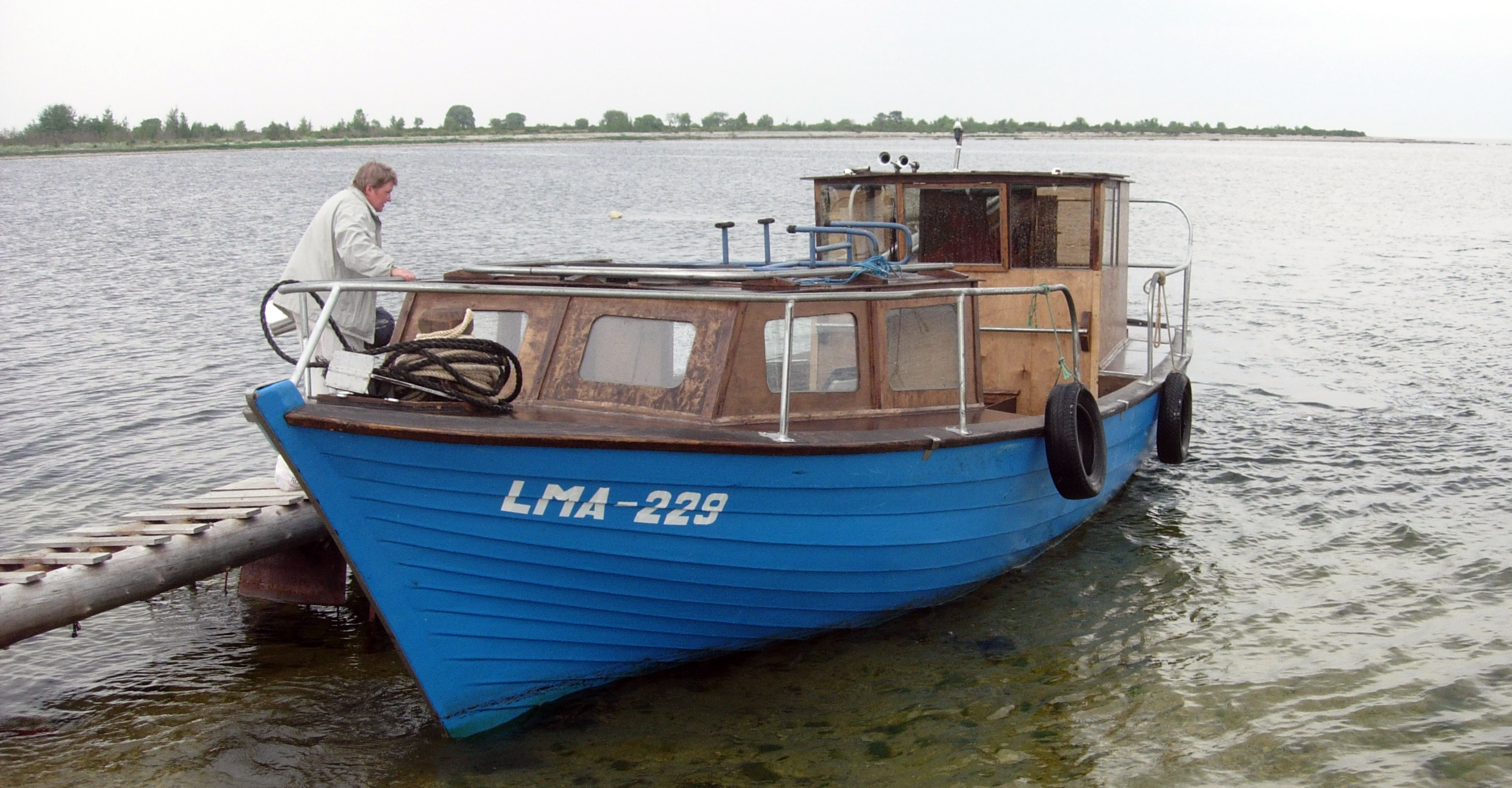
Floating dock on Osmussaar in 2006.

Osmussaar has no regular connection to the Estonian mainland. The nearest port is Dirhami 9 km to southeast, which is the starting point of most boat trips to the island. Until 2008, when a floating wharf was installed, the island itself had no decent landing facilities.

The popularity of Osmussaar as a tourist destination increased remarkably in 2002, when around 2000 people visited the island. Since then up to 3000 people visit the island every summer.

== See also ==
- Neugrund crater
