= List of Vorpostenboote in World War II =

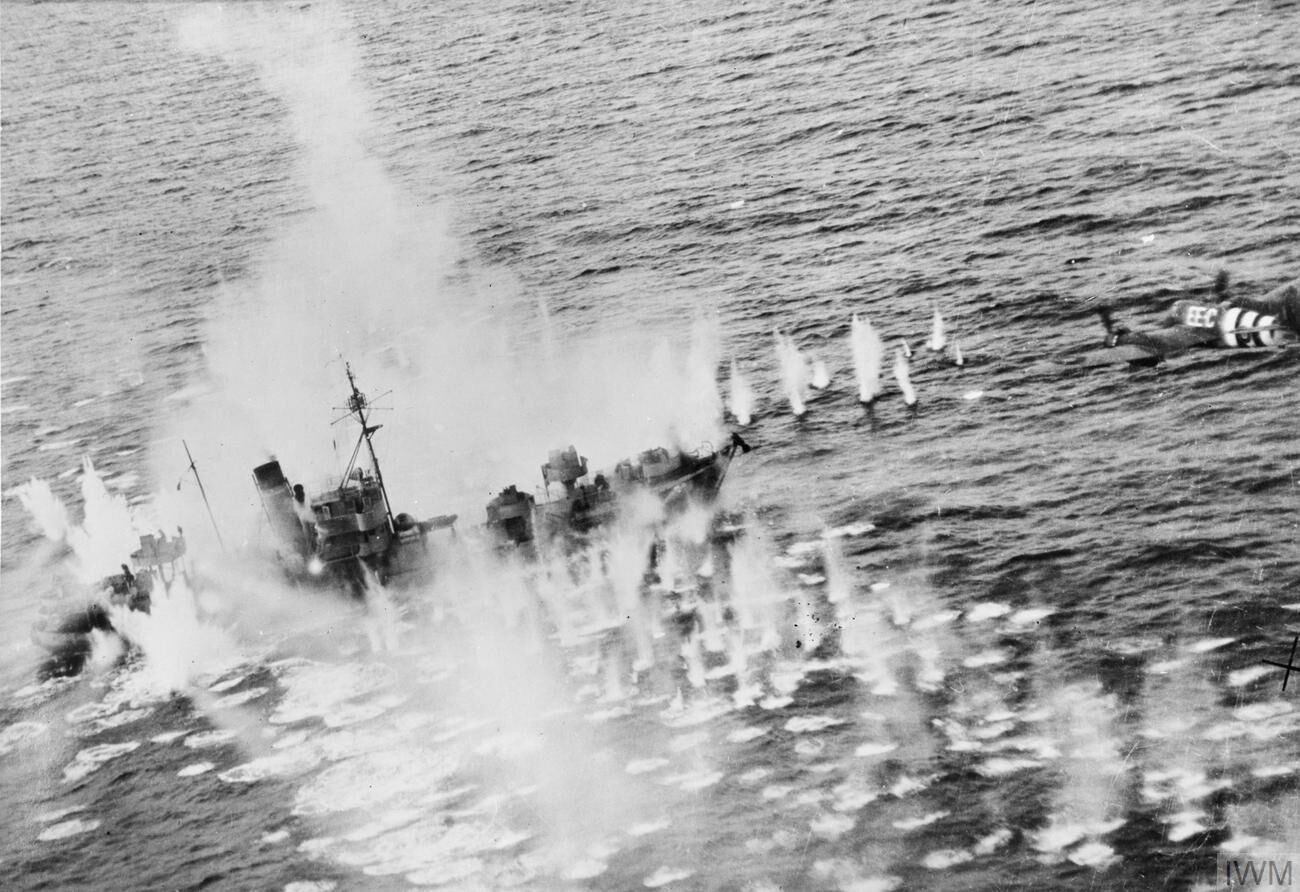
V 1605 Mosel, a minesweeper and Vorpostenboot strafed by Allied aircraft

A Vorpostenboot (plural Vorpostenboote) was an auxiliary warship used by Germany in both World Wars. Many vorpostenboote also served in other roles, such as sperrbrecher (mine clearance) and weather ships. During World War II, the Vorpostenboote were organized into several surface flotillas which were in turn attached to various German ports. Over 30 Vorpostenflotillas were established to operate off the German, Channel, Baltic and Scandinavian coasts.

== 1 Vorpostenflotille ==
1 Vorpostenflotille was active in the western Baltic from 1 October 1939 to 1 October 1940, when it was redesignated 3 Sperrbrecherflotille.

Ship	Armament	Displacement	Propulsion	Service		
Ship	Armament	Displacement	Propulsion	Launched	Commissioned	Fate
V 101 Schwan		1,311 GRT, 724 NRT.	Compound steam engine, single screw propeller.	1938.	1 October 1939.	Later served as Sperrbrecher 31 and Sperrbrecher 131. Survived the war, used by German Mine Sweeping Administration. Claimed by United Kingdom as a prize in 1947, renamed Weltonwold, later Rhineland. Sold to South Africa in 1956. Renamed Herriesbrook, later Inyoni. Scrapped 1962.
V 102 Cressida		1,046 GRT, 477 NRT.	Compound steam engine, single screw propeller.	1939.	1 October 1939.	Survived the war and returned to civilian service, ran aground and sank off Karpathos, Greece on 23 December 1962.
V 103 Sylvia		1,049 GRT.			1 October 1939.	Survived the war, transferred to German Mine Sweeping Administration.
V 104 Falke		998 GRT, 480 NRT.	Triple expansion steam engine, single screw propeller.	31 July 1909.	1 October 1939.	Bombed and sunk off Lorient, Morbihan, France, 8 August 1944.
V 105 Cremon		268 GRT, 104 NRT.	Triple expansion steam engine, single screw propeller.	1922.	1 October 1939.	Struck a mine and sank in the Norwegian Sea off Bergen, Norway on 11 April 1940.
V 106 Phönix		999 GRT, 530 NRT.	Triple expansion steam engine, single screw propeller.	28 January 1913.	1 October 1939.	Scuttled at Saint-Nazaire, Loire-Inférieure, France on 25 August 1944.
V 107 Botilla Russ		996 GRT, 586 NRT.	Triple expansion steam engine, single screw propeller.	1922.	1 October 1939.	Struck a mine and sank off the coast of Finistère, France on 28 January 1944.
V 108 Friedrich Karl		1,262 GRT, 589 NRT.	Triple expansion steam engine, single screw propeller.	1938.		Struck a mine and sank off Borkum on 23 December 1942.
V 108 Porjus		764 GRT, 355 NRT.	Diesel engine, single screw propeller.	24 April 1937.	1 October 1939.	Survived the war and returned to civilian service, wrecked off the coast of "Cheka" on 27 November 1976.
V 109 Flamingo		975 GRT, 402 NRT, 1,035 DWT.	Triple expansion steam engine, single screw propeller.	1909.	1 October 1939.	Struck a mine and sank off Lindesnes, Norway on 18 February 1945.

== 2 Vorpostenflotille ==
2 Vorpostenflotille existed from September 1939 to December 1944, when it was disbanded. Many vessels were redesignated within the unit, later designations are shown in brackets

Ship	Armament	Displacement	Propulsion	Service		
Ship	Armament	Displacement	Propulsion	Launched	Commissioned	Fate
V 201 Seydlitz (V 211)		449 GRT, 167 NRT.	Triple expansion steam engine, single screw propeller.	1936.	1 October 1939.	Sunk in the English Channel off Barfleur, Manche, France by British aircraft on 20 March 1944.
V 202 Franz Westermann (V 205)		481 GRT, 178 NRT.	Triple expansion steam engine, single screw propeller.	1937.	1 October 1939.	Sunk in an Allied air raid on St. Peter Port, Guernsey on 15 June 1944.
V 203 Heinrich Buermann (V 207)						Sunk in an Allied air raid on Le Havre, France on 14 June 1944.
V 204 Dorum		470 GRT, 171 NRT.	Triple expansion steam engine, single screw propeller.	1937.	10 September 1939.	To 4 Vorpostenflotille, October 1939
V 205 Hermann Bösch (V 202)		470 GRT, 170 NRT.	Triple expansion steam engine, single screw propeller.	1937.	10 September 1939.	Shelled and sunk in the English Channel off La Hague, France by HMS Calpe and HMS Cottesmore on 28 July 1942.
V 206 Gauleiter Telschow (V 209)		428 GRT, 159 NRT.	Triple expansion steam engine, single screw propeller.	1937.	12 September 1939.	Torpedoed and sunk in the North Sea off Heligoland by HMS Sturgeon on 20 November 1939.
V 207 Otto Bröhan (V 206)	1 x 88mm gun, 1 x 20mm cannon (1939–43), 1 x 88mm gun, 5 x 20mm cannon (1943–44).	510 GRT, 189 NRT.	Triple expansion steam engine, single screw propeller.	28 December 1937.	6 October 1939.	Scuttled at Caen, Calvados, France on 12 June 1944.
V 208 Gebrüder Kähler (V 201)		460 GRT, 170 NRT.	Triple expansion steam engine, single screw propeller.	20 October 1937.>	24 September 1939.	Struck a mine and sank in the Westerschelde on 5 September 1940.
V 209 Carl Röver (V 203)		396 GRT, 151 NRT.	Triple expansion steam engine, single screw propeller.	July 1933.	28 September 1939.	Severely damaged in an engagement with HMS Eskimo and HMCS Huron in the English Channel on 13 July 1944. Withdrawn from service September 1944.
V 209 Dr. Rudolf Wahrendorff		381 GRT, 147 NRT.	Triple expansion steam engine, single screw propeller.	17 September 1928.	23 December 1939.	Sunk by Allied aircraft at St. Peter Port on 24 July 1944.
V 210 R. Walther Darré (V 208)		391 GRT, 151 NRT.	Compound steam engine, single screw propeller.	July 1933.	28 September 1939.	Sunk in the English Channel off the coast of Normandy on 4 July 1944 by British MTBs.
V 211 Friedrich Busse (V 212)		438 GRT, 166 NRT.	Triple expansion steam engine, single screw propeller.	7 November 1934.	16 September 1939.	Scuttled at Caen on 12 June 1944.
V 212 Hinrich Hey (V 210)		422 GRT, 156 NRT.	Triple expansion steam engine, single screw propeller.	6 October 1934.	24 September 1939.	Sunk in the English Channel off the coast of Normandy, by British Motor Torpedo Boats on 4 July 1944.
V 213 Claus Bolten		282 GRT, 109 NRT.	Compound steam engine, single screw propeller.	25 September 1937.	18 June 1940.	Sunk in an engagement with HMS Eskimo and HMCS Huron by the Channel Islands on 28 June 1944.
V 213 Zieten (V 204)		422 GRT, 156 NRT.	Triple expansion steam engine, single screw propeller.	16 October 1934.	17 September 1939.	Scuttled at Nantes, Loire-Inférieure, France in 1945. Subsequently, raised, repaired and became the French Navy survey ship and later merchant fishing trawler Astrolabe. Scrapped 1953.
V 214 Spica		325 GRT, 123 NRT.	Compound steam engine, single screw propeller.	5 November 1930.	17 September 1939.	To 8 Vorpostenflotille, 21 October 1939.
V 214 Teutonia		487 GRT, 188 NRT.	Triple expansion steam engine, single screw propeller.	17 June 1937.	28 September 1939 (as M 1507).	Became a French fishing trawler post-war. Scrapped 1961.
V 215 Baden		321 GRT, 126 NRT.	Triple expansion steam engine, single screw propeller.	June 1930.	23 September 1939.	To 4 Vorpostenflotille, 21 October 1939.
V 215 Hela						Sunk in the Baltic Sea off Hel, Danzig-West Prussia by Soviet aircraft on 16 April 1945.
V 215 Oliva		321 GRT, 126 NRT.	Triple expansion steam engine, single screw propeller.	25 March 1920.	1 June 1942 (as V1523).	Scuttled at Saint-Malo, Ille-et-Vilaine on 6 August 1944. Raised and repaired post war, returned to owners. Scrapped 1957.
V 216 Goëland						Sunk at Saint-Malo, France on 6 August 1944.
V 222						Scuttled at Brest, France on 18 August 1944.
V 223						Scuttled at Brest, France on 18 August 1944.
V 224						Scuttled at Brest, France on 18 August 1944.
V 225						Scuttled at Brest, France on 18 August 1944.
V 226						Scuttled at Brest, France on 18 August 1944.
V 227						Scuttled at Brest, France on 18 August 1944.

== 3 Vorpostenflotille ==
3 Vorpostenflotille was established in September 1939.

Ship	Armament	Displacement	Propulsion	Service		
Ship	Armament	Displacement	Propulsion	Launched	Commissioned	Fate
V 301 Weser		650 GRT, 245 NRT.	Triple expansion steam engine, single screw propeller.	September 1938.	27 September 1939.	Struck a mine and sank in the Baltic Sea off Langeland, Denmark on 25 November 1939. Subsequently, raised, repaired and returned to service. Returned to owners December 1941. Scrapped in 1962.
V 302 Bremen		408 GRT, 156 NRT.	Triple expansion steam engine, single screw propeller.	April 1929.	30 September 1939.	Returned to owners post-war. Scrapped in 1953.
V 303 Tannenberg		372 GRT, 140 NRT.	Triple expansion steam engine, single screw propeller.	May 1935.	23 September 1939.	Sunk on 5 January 1941. Raised, repaired and returned to service. Returned to owners post-war. Converted to cargo ship in 1958. Wrecked in 1978.
V 304 Breslau		295 GRT, 115 NRT.	Triple expansion steam engine, single screw propeller.	May 1925.	30 September 1939.	Wrecked at the entrance to the Noordzeekanaal, 17 September 1940.
V 305 Ostpreussen		372 GRT, 140 NRT.	Triple expansion steam engine, single screw propeller.	June 1935.	30 September 1939.	Returned to owners post-war. Converted to cargo ship 1957, scrapped 1958.
V 306 Fritz Hincke		381 GRT, 147 NRT.	Triple expansion steam engine, single screw propeller.	August 1929.	23 September 1939.	Struck a mine and sank in the North Sea off IJmuiden, Netherlands on 5 January 1940.
V 307 Württemberg		374 GRT, 141 NRT.	Triple expansion steam engine, single screw propeller.	26 November 1929.	25 September 1939.	Returned to owners post-war. Scrapped July 1957.
V 308 Oscar Neynaber		314 GRT, 120 NRT.	Compound steam engine, single screw propeller.	30 October 1929.	17 September 1939.	Torpedoed and sunk in the Baltic Sea by the Soviet Motor Torpedo Boat TKA-12 on 23 September 1941.
V 309 Martin Donandt		367 GRT, 142 NRT.	Triple expansion steam engine, single screw propeller.	August 1927.	28 September 1939.	Struck a mine and sank in the Baltic Sea off Ventspils, Latvia on 28 October 1941.
V 310 Rosemarie		292 GRT, 112 NRT.	Triple expansion steam engine, single screw propeller.	September 1924.	29 April 1941.	Returned to owners post war. Scrapped in 1953.
V 311 Osdorf		250 GRT, 99 NRT.	Triple expansion steam engine, single screw propeller.	1 September 1921.	20 April 1941.	Returned to owners post war. Sold to Norway in 1951 and rebuilt as a coaster. Lost in a collision in 1956.
V 312 Hanseat		305 GRT, 109 NRT.	Triple expansion steam engine, single screw propeller.	5 August 1926.	3 May 1941.	Ran aground and was wrecked on 20 August 1942.
V 313 Eifel		290 GRT, 112 NRT.	Triple expansion steam engine, single screw propeller.	1929.	20 April 1941.	Returned to owner post-war. Scrapped 1955.
V 314 Heinrich Lehnert		269 GRT, 103 NRT.	Triple expansion steam engine, single screw propeller.	September 1918.	27 April 1941.	Redesignated Vs 314 Heinrich Lehnert on 1 October 1943. Returned to owners post-war, scrapped 1950.
V 315 Bris	1 x 75 or 88mm cannon, 2 x 37mm anti-aircraft guns, 4 to 10 x 20mm machine guns, 6 x depth charge throwers.	589 GRT, displacement 1,250 tons.	Triple expansion steam engine, single screw propeller.	14 June 1941.	3 February 1942.	Collided with Hendrik Fisser 7 and sank in the Baltic Sea off Großendorf, Danzig-West Prussia on 12 March 1945.
V 316						Torpedoed and sunk in the North Sea off Den Helder, Netherlands by Allied aircraft on 25 September 1943.
V 317 Wega		337 GRT, 128 NRT.	Compound steam engine, single screw propller.	23 December 1931.	29 November 1939.	Returned to owners post-war. Scrapped 1955.

== 4 Vorpostenflotille ==
4 Vorpostenflotille was formed in September 1939 and was disbanded in September 1944. Many vessels were re-designated within the unit. Later designations are shown in brackets.

Ship	Armament	Displacement	Propulsion	Service		
Ship	Armament	Displacement	Propulsion	Launched	Commissioned	Fate
V 401 Nordland (V 411)		393 GRT, 152 NRT.	Triple expansion steam engine, single screw propeller.	3 October 1922.	4 September 1939.	Redesignated V 411 on 7 September 1939, but then returned to civilian use. Captured by HMS Hostile off the Lofoten Islands 7 April 1940, became the salvage vessel HMS Nordland. Sold in 1948 and became the sludge carrier Tulipfield. Scrapped at Antwerp, Belgium in October 1965.
V 401 Dr. Adolf Spilker (V 402)		435 GRT, 168 NRT.	Compound steam engine, single screw propeller.	22 August 1936.	16 September 1939.	Scuttled at Bayonne, France on 21 August 1944.
V 402 Hans Loh (V 406)		464 GRT, 159 NRT.	Triple expansion steam engine, single screw propeller.	23 November 1936.	17 September 1939.	Struck a mine and sank in the Gironde Estuary on 18 August 1944.
V 403 Germania (V 410)		427 GRT, 168 NRT.	Triple expansion steam engine, single screw propeller.	11 July 1934.	17 September 1939.	Attacked by Allied aircraft and sank in the Gironde Estuary, 12 August 1944 with the loss of three of her crew.
V 404 Deutschland (V 403)		432 GRT, 161 NRT.	Triple expansion steam engine, single screw propeller.	July 1934.	3 September 1939.	Struck a mine and sank off Vlissingen, Netherlands on 5 September 1940 with the loss of four of her crew.
V 404 Baden		321 GRT, 126 NRT.	Triple expansion steam engine, single screw propeller.	June 1930.	23 September 1939 (as V 215 Baden).	Scuttled at Bordeaux, Gironde, France, 26 August 1944. Raised post-war, repaired and returned to service as the French cargo ship Docteur Edmond Papin.
V 405 J. Hinrich Wilhelms		440 GRT, 162 NRT.	Triple expansion steam engine, single screw propeller.	6 October 1934.	22 September 1939.	Scuttled at Bayonne on 30 August 1944. Repaired post-war and entered French merchant service. Scrapped 1974.
V 406 Jan Mayen (V 401)		654 GRT, 246 NRT.	Triple expansion steam engine, single screw propeller.	29 September 1938.	23 September 1939.	Scuttled at Bayonne on 22 August 1944. Refloated post-war, served as a French and Dutch fishing boat. Converted to a cargo ship in early 1970s, in service until at least 1982.
V 407 Saarland (V 411)		435 GRT, 162 NRT.	Triple expansion steam engine, single screw propeller.	27 June 1934.	25 September 1939.	Sunk at Le Verdon-sur-Mer by Beaufighter aircraft on 26 August 1944.
V 407 Dorum		470 GRT, 171 NRT.	Triple expansion steam engine, single screw propeller.	1937.	10 September 1939 (as V204 Dorum).	Scuttled, either in the Gironde or at Bordeaux on 28 August 1944.
V 408 Haltenbank		444 GRT, 166 NRT.	Triple expansion steam engine, single screw propeller.	September 1934.	20 September 1939.	Torpedoed and sunk in the Bay of Biscay by USS Blackfish on 19 February 1943.
V 409 August Bösch		401 GRT, 155 NRT.	Triple expansion steam engine, single screw propeller.	8 June 1934.	25 September 1939.	Bombed and sunk at Les Sables-d'Olonne, France on 20 August 1944.
V 412 Bremerhaven		371 GRT, 139 NRT.	Triple expansion steam engine, single screw propeller.	August 1927.	23 November 1939.	Torpedoed and sunk by HMMTB 45 west of Saint-Pol-de-Léon, Finistère, France on 25 November 1941.
V 413 Ferdinand Niedermeyer		266 GRT, 103 NRT.	Triple expansion steam engine, single screw propeller.	18 September 1925.	23 May 1941.	Sunk at Le Verdon-sur-Mer by Beaufighter aircraft on 21 August 1944.
V 414 Sachsenwald	1 × 8.8 cm deck gun, 1 × 3.7 cm SK C/30 AA gun, 2 × 2 cm C/30 quad AA guns, 2 × 2 cm C/30 AA guns, 2 × 1.5 cm AA guns, depth charges	650 GRT, 240 NRT, 1,425 tons displacement.	Triple expansion steam engine, single screw propeller.	June 1939.	January 1940.	Shelled and sunk in the Bay of Biscay on 6 August 1944.
V 415 Gotland						
V 420 Alcyon		266 GRT, 103 NRT.	Triple expansion steam engine, single screw propeller.	1904.		Sunk in the Gironde Estuary by Royal Air Force aircraft on 20 August 1943.
V 421 Rauzan		259 GRT, 111 NRT.	Triple expansion steam engine, single screw propeller.	10 April 1906.	1 October 1942.	Lost in the English Channel, 4 June 1944.
V 422 Kergroise		261 GRT, 84 NRT.	Triple expansion steam engine, single screw propeller.	July 1918.	13 October 1942.	Bombed and sunk off Lorient by Allied aircraft on 30 June 1944.
V 423 Keryado II		320 GRT, 147 NRT.	Triple expansion steam engine, single screw propeller.	1904.	20 August 1942 .	Returned to owners post-war, scrapped 1955.
V 424 Carl J. Busch		305 GRT, 101 NRT.	Diesel engine, single screw propeller.	14 April 1925.	1939.	Sold to Norway post-war, eventually scrapped in November 1979.
V 427 Victoire		255 GRT, 72 NRT.	Triple expansion steam engine, single screw propeller.	26 February 1908.	4 June 1941.	To 13 Vorpostenflottille as V 1311 Victoire, 10 October 1942.
V 430					3 June 1944.	
V 431					21 June 1944.	
V 432					23 June 1944.	
V 433					23 June 1944.	
V 434					24 June 1944.	
V 435					27 June 1944.	

== 5 Vorpostengruppe ==
5 Vorpostengruppe was established in September 1939 and disbanded on 22 May 1940.

Ship	Armament	Displacement	Propulsion	Service		
Ship	Armament	Displacement	Propulsion	Launched	Commissioned	Fate
Wandrahm (Schiff 4)		1,228 GRT, 683 NRT.	Triple expansion steam engine, single screw propeller.	29 November 1927.	30 September 1939.	Later V 1801 Wandrahm and V 6114 Eismeer. To Soviet Union post-war as factory ship Onega.
Birka (Schiff 8)	Unarmed	1,000 GRT, 508 NRT.	Compound steam engine, single screw propeller.	23 June 1937.	5 September 1940.	Struck a mine and sank in the Altafjord, 1 June 1943.
Neuss (Schiff 15)		1,243 GRT, 673 NRT.	Two diesel engines, twin screw propellers.	11 October 1935.	30 September 1939.	Returned to owners post-war.
Nerissa (Schiff 20)		992 GRT, 454 NRT.	Compound steam engine, single screw propeller.	6 June 1936.	7 September 1939.	Torpedoed and sunk 28 June 1944.

== 6 Vorpostengruppe ==
6 Vorpostengruppe was established in September 1939 and disbanded on 22 May 1940.

Ship	Armament	Displacement	Propulsion	Service		
Ship	Armament	Displacement	Propulsion	Launched	Commissioned	Fate
Dr. Heinrich Wiegand (Schiff 12)		1,421 GRT, 797 NRT, 2,500 DWT.	Compound steam engine, single screw propeller.	1 September 1938.	13 September 1939.	To 6 Vorpostenflotille in 1943.
Jupiter (Schiff 1)		2,170 GRT, 1,357 NRT.	Triple expansion steam engine, single screw propeller.	25 January 1895.	January 1940.	To Deutsches Hydrographisches Institut post-war. Scrapped 1949.
Möwe (Schiff 7)						
Oldenburg (Schiff 35)		2,312 GRT, 1,223 NRT.	Compound steam engine, single screw propeller.	29 June 1936.	12 October 1939.	Torpedoed and sunk by HMS Sunfish on 14 April 1940.
Schürbek (Schiff 40)		2,448 GRT, 1,435 NRT.	Compound steam engine, single screw propeller.	10 April 1930.	5 September 1939.	Bombed and damaged at Hamburg on 12 March 1945. Declared a constructive total loss. Scrapped 1948–49.

== 6 Vorpostenflotille ==
6 Vorpostenflotille was established on 1 January 1943 and disbanded in September 1944.

Ship	Armament	Displacement	Propulsion	Service		
Ship	Armament	Displacement	Propulsion	Launched	Commissioned	Fate
V 601 Dr. Heinrich Wiegand (Schiff 12)		1,421 GRT, 797 NRT, 2,500 DWT.	Compound steam engine, single screw propeller.	1 September 1938.	13 September 1939.	Sunk in Allied air attack at Wesermünde on 18 September 1944. Subsequently refloated, allocated to United States post-war.
V 602 Richard C. Krogmann		290 GRT, 110 NRT.	Compound steam engine, single screw propeller.	14 June 1928.	5 September 1939.	Struck a mine and sank in the Charente on 11 November 1943.
V 603 Carsten		258 GRT, 98 NRT.	Triple expansion steam engine, single screw propeller.	June 1923.	22 September 1939.	Allocated to France post-war, scrapped 1954.
V 604 Fritz Reiser		278 GRT, 107 NRT.	Triple expansion steam engine, single screw propeller.	15 November 1924.	22 September 1939.	Seized by France in 1944.
V 605 Arthur Duncker		278 GRT, 107 NRT.	Triple expansion steam engine, single screw propeller.	28 October 1924.	22 September 1939.	Struck a mine and sank in the English Channel off La Pallice on 14 August 1944.
V 606 Fladengrund	1 x 88mm cannon, various 20mm guns.	258 GRT, 98 NRT.	Triple expansion steam engine, single screw propeller.	May 1923.	22 September 1939.	Sunk in the Bay of Biscay off Belle Île in a British air raid on 26 April 1944.
V 607 Düsseldorf		259 GRT, 96 NRT.	Triple expansion steam engine, single screw propeller.	6 April 1921.	8 August 1940.	Sunk in French waters, 1944. Subsequently refloated, repaired and entered French service as the fishing vessel Turbot in 1948.
V 620 Derfflinger		298 GRT, 136 NRT.	Diesel engine, single screw propeller.	16 February 1939.	9 October 1939.	To French Navy post-war. Sold in 1948, became fishing trawler André Guillaume. Scrapped December 1953.
V 621 Mars		268 GRT, 124 NRT.	Diesel engine, single screw propeller.	8 June 1937.	10 September 1939.	Sunk in the Bay of Biscay off Belle Île by Allied air attack on 6 July 1944.
V 622 Almuth		269 GRT, 120 NRT.	Diesel engine, single screw propeller.	5 May 1937.	11 September 1939.	Struck a mine and sank in the Bay of Biscay off Saint-Nazaire on 8 April 1944.
V 623 Jupiter		267 GRT, 126 NRT.	Diesel engine, single screw propeller.	27 June 1936.	9 October 1939.	Scuttled at Nantes on 11 August 1944.
V 624 Köln		269 GRT, 121 NRT.	Diesel engine, single screw propeller.	15 April 1937.	9 October 1939.	Struck a mine 31 July 1943 and laid up. Seized by French in 1944, repaired and entered service with the French Navy in 1946. Rebuilt to transport ship in 1947 and renamed Molène. Sold in 1963 and became a fishing trawler again.
V 625 Johann Schulte		298 GRT, 136 NRT.	Diesel engine, single screw propeller.	22 March 1939.	7 January 1940.	Sunk 1945. Salvaged by the French, repaired and entered service with the French Navy in 1946. Rebuilt to transport ship in 1947 and renamed Gapeau. Sold in 1969, Scrapped in 1970.
V 626 Le Tésterin						
V 627 Elise						
V 628 De Ruyter						

== 7 Vorpostenflotille ==
7 Vorpostenflotille was established on 22 September 1939. It was disbanded in September 1944.

Ship	Armament	Displacement	Propulsion	Service		
Ship	Armament	Displacement	Propulsion	Launched	Commissioned	Fate
V 701 Este						Struck a mine and sank in the Danish Straits on 21 October 1939.
V 702 Memel						Shelled and sunk off Audierne by HMS Mauritius, HMS Ursa and HMCS Iroquois on 23 August 1944.
V 703 Henry Fricke						Ran aground on Alderney and was wrecked on 14 January 1943.
V 704 Claus Wisch						Struck a mine in the Baltic Sea off Trelleborg on 30 November 1939, beached but declared a total loss.
V 704 Richard C. Krogmann		Compound steam engine, single screw propeller.	290 GRT, 110 NRT.	14 June 1928.	5 September 1939.	To 6 Vorpostenflotille, 1 July 1943
V 705 Carsten		Triple expansion steam engine, single screw propeller.	258 GRT, 98 NRT.	June 1923.	22 September 1939.	To 6 Vorpostenflotille, 1 July 1943.
V 706 Fritz Reiser		Triple expansion steam engine, single screw propeller.	278 GRT, 107 NRT.	15 November 1924.	22 September 1929.	To 6 Vorpostenflotille, 19 August 1943.
V 707 Arthur Duncker		278 GRT, 107 NRT.	Triple expansion steam engine, single screw propeller.	28 October 1924.	22 September 1939.	To 6 Vorpostenflotille, 10 December 1943.
V 708 Fladengrund	1 x 88mm cannon, various 20mm guns.	258 GRT, 98 NRT.	Triple expansion steam engine, single screw propeller.	May 1923.	22 September 1939.	To 6 Vorpostenflotille, 8 February 1944.
V 709 Guido Möhring						Torpedoed and sunk in the Bay of Biscay off Port Ley on 18 April 1941.
V 710 Düsseldorf		259 GRT, 96 NRT.	Triple expansion steam engine, single screw propeller.	6 April 1921.	8 August 1940.	To 6 Vorpostenflotille, 9 April 1944.
V 711 Senator Predöhl						
V 712						Struck a mine and sank in the English Channel off Cherbourg on 20 January 1944.
V 712 Chemnitz						Struck a mine and sank in the English Channel off Cherbourg on 20 January 1944.
V 713 Leipzig						Struck a mine and sank in the Bay of Biscay off Brest on 19 July 1944.
V 714 Neubau 168						
V 715 Alfred I						Sunk in Bay of Biscay by HMCS Qu'Appelle, Restigouche, Saskatchewan, and Skeena on 7 July 1944.
V 716 Alfred II						
V 717 Alfred III						Sunk in Bay of Biscay by HMS Mauritius, HMS Ursa and HMCS Iroquois on 23 August 1944.
V 718						
V 719 Neubau 240						
V 720						
V 721 Neubau 308						Shelled in English Channel by British ships on 6 July 1944, beached at Penmarc'h.
V 722 Pilote XIII						Struck a mine and sank in the English Channel near Brest (Bertheaume bay) on 15 March 1944. The wreck position in WGS84 is 48°18,77'N – 4°41,03'W.
V 723 Jeanne Marie						Shelled and sunk at Brest on 13 August 1944.
V 724 St. Dominique						Struck a mine and sank in the Bay of Biscay off Brest on 4 June 1944.
V 725 Petit Poilu						Bombed and sunk at Pauillac, Gironde, France on 5 August 1944.
V 726 Antifer						
V 727 Goëland						Scuttled at Saint-Malo, Ille-et-Vilaine, France on 14 August 1944.
V 728 Vierge de Nassabielle						
V 729 Marie Simone						Sunk in the Bay of Biscay by HMS Mauritius, HMS Ursa and HMCS Iroquois on 23 August 1944.
V 730 Michel François						Sunk in the Bay of Biscay by HMS Mauritius, HMS Ursa and HMCS Iroquois on 23 August 1944.

== 8 Vorpostenflotille ==
8 Vorpostenflotille was formed in September 1939 and disbanded in 1945. One vessel was redesignated within the unit.

Ship	Armament	Displacement	Propulsion	Service		
Ship	Armament	Displacement	Propulsion	Launched	Commissioned	Fate
V 801 Bayern						Struck a mine and sank in the Wadden Sea off Ameland on 9 June 1940.
V 801 Max Gundelach						Sunk in the North Sea off Terschelling on 25 July 1943 by Allied action.
V 801 Stoomloodsvartuig 17						
V 802 Sagitta						
V 803 Stuttgart (V 806)						
V 803 Wiesbaden						Sank on 15 August 1944.
V 804 Skolpenbank						Struck a mine and sank in the North Sea off Schiermonnikoog on 17 October 1939.
V 804 Spica		325 GRT, 123 NRT.	Compound steam engine, single screw propeller.	5 November 1930.	17 September 1939 (as V 214 Spica).	Returned to owners post-war. Scrapped 1955.
V 805 Island						Struck a mine and sank in the North Sea off Terschelling on 20 July 1943.
V 805 MFL 8						
V 806 Stuttgart						
V 807 Auguste Kämpf						Torpedoed and sunk in the North Sea off Terschelling by Beaufighter aircraft of the RAF on 29 April 1943.
V 807 MFL 1						
V 808 Reichspräsident von Hindenburg						Bombed and sunk in the North Sea off Borkum by RAF aircraft on 2 May 1941.
V 808 Ehrensburger						
V 809 Konsul Dubbers						
V 810 Falkland						Torpedoed and sunk in the North Sea off Land Wursten by aircraft of Coastal Command, RAF on 22 July 1944.
V 811 Hugo Homann						Struck a mine in the Ems estuary and sank on 6 May 1940.
V 811 Claus Ebeling						
V 812 Amtsgerichsrat Pitschke						Sunk in an Allied air raid on 22 July 1944.
V 813 Otto Krogmann						
V 814 Gotland						

== 9 Vorpostenflotille ==
9 Vorpostenflotille was established on 27 September 1939. It was disbanded on 23 April 1945.

Ship	Armament	Displacement	Propulsion	Service		
Ship	Armament	Displacement	Propulsion	Launched	Commissioned	Fate
V 901 Senator Sprecher						
V 902 Senator Sachse						
V 903 Mainz						
V 904 Else Wilhelms						
V 905 Karl Bergh						
V 906 Schwalbe						
V 907 Spessart						
V 907 N. Elbing						
V 908 Claus Ebeling						
V 909 Flensburg						
V 910						
V 911						
V 912						
V 913						
V 914						
V 915						
V 916						
V 917						
Schiff 7 Wega		337 GRT, 128 NRT.	Compound steam engine, single screw propller.	23 December 1931.	29 November 1939.	To 3 Vorpostenflotille, 1 May 1943.

== 10 Vorpostenflotille ==
10 Vorpostenflotille was established in September 1939. It was renamed 10 Sicherungsflottille on 1 October 1943.

Ship	Armament	Displacement	Propulsion	Service		
Ship	Armament	Displacement	Propulsion	Launched	Commissioned	Fate
V 1001 Thüringen						
V 1001 Stettin						
V 1002 Tilly						
V 1002 A. Kappelhof						
V 1003 Welle						
V 1003 Hanna						
V 1004 Johanna						
V 1004 Anna						
V 1005 Cremona						
V 1005 Amalie						
V 1006 Hayo						
V 1006 Elfriede						
V 1007 Käthe						
V 1007 Gesine						
V 1008 Walküre						
V 1008 Marie						
V 1009 Gertrud						
V 1009 Cornelia						
V 1010 Allegro						
V 1010 Martha						
V 1011 Altair						
V 1011 Adeline						
V 1012 Anna Marie						
V 1012 Erika						
V 1013 Herinrich Brons						
V 1014 Richard Ohlrogge						Struck a mine and sank in the Great Belt on 20 July 1943.
V 1014 Kiel						

== 11 Vorpostenflotille ==
11 Vorpostenflotille was formed in September 1939. A few vessels were redesignated within the unit.

Ship	Armament	Displacement	Propulsion	Service		
Ship	Armament	Displacement	Propulsion	Launched	Commissioned	Fate
V 1101 Preußen		425 grt	Single Screw propeller	1930	1939	Sunk in the North Sea off Langeoog by rockets fired by RAF Beaufighters on 13 August 1944.
V 1102 Gleiwitz						Driven ashore and wrecked at Hanstholm, Denmark on 30 January 1943.
V 1102 Lützow						
V 1103 Nordkap						Struck a mine and sank in the North Sea off Ameland, Netherlands on 29 May 1942.
V 1103 Reemt						
V 1104 Ernst von Briesen						Torpedoed in the North Sea off Borkum by Coastal Command Beaufighters on 18 May 1943.
V 1104 Weißenfels						Struck a mine and sank in the North Sea off Cuxhaven on 14 February 1945.
V 1105 Ernst Gröschel						Struck a mine and sank in the North Sea on 26 January 1943.
V 1105 Jochen Homann						
V 1106 Heinrich Bueren						Struck a mine and sank in the Elbe on 12 February 1945.
V 1106 Neufundland						
V 1107 Portland						Torpedoed and sunk in the Norwegian Sea south of Stavanger by HMS Snapper on 25 June 1940.
V 1108 Arctur						Torpedoed and sunk in the North Sea off Texel on 2 August 1943.
V 1109 Antares						Struck a mine and sank in the North Sea off Haugesund on 29 May 1940.
V 1109 Mähren						Bombed and torpedoed in the North Sea off Den Helder by Royal Air Force aircraft 13 June 1943.
V 1110 Hermann Hinrichs						Torpedoed and sunk in the North Sea off Vlieland by Coastal Command Beaufighters on 17 May 1943.
V 1111 Christian Wendig						Bombed in the North Sea off Spiekeroog by Coastal Command Beaufighters on 21 July 1944, subsequently bombed again and sunk in the Jade Bight.
V 1112						
V 1113						
V 1114						Bombed and sunk in the German Bight by RAF aircraft on 26 April 1945.
V 1115						

== 12 Vorpostenflotille ==
12 Vorpostenflotille was formed on 26 September 1939. It was disbanded in December 1947.

Ship	Armament	Displacement	Propulsion	Service		
Ship	Armament	Displacement	Propulsion	Launched	Commissioned	Fate
V 1201 Düneck						
V 1201 Juno						
V 1201 De Mok I						
V 1202 Angelina						
V 1202 Friedrich Suthmeier						
V 1203 Annemarie						
V 1203 G. F. Zimmermenn						
V 1204 Armin						
V 1204 C. H. Metger						
V 1204 Christiane Cécile						
V 1205 Germania						
V 1205 Ravensburg						
V 1206 Maria Lina						
V 1206 Ministerialdirektor Streil						
V 1207 Emil						
V 1207 P. von Rensen						
V 1208 Elternsegen						
V 1208 Heinrich Kappelhoff						
V 1209 Jacobus						
V 1209 H. Bramfeldt						
V 1210 Anita III						
V 1210 D. Dreesmann Penning						
V 1211 Meta Osterwisch						
V 1211 Leo Fürbinger						
V 1212 Anna						
V 1212 L. Ruyl						
V 1213 Fro						
V 1214 Joannes Georgius						
V 1214 St. Joachim						
V 1215 Hennie						
V 1216 Marie						
V 1217 Frida						
V 1218						
V 1219						
V 1220						
V 1221						
V 1222						
V 1223						
V 1224						

- V 1225
- V 1226
- V 1227
- V 1228
- V 1229
- V 1230
- V 1231 Toni
- V 1232 Elise
- V 1233 Vooruit †
- V 1234 Koningin Emma
- V 1235 Columbus
- V 1236 'Flevo III †
- V 1236 Augusta †
- V 1237 Notre Dame de Dunes †
- V 1238 Voorloper
- V 1239 Vooran
- V 1240 Therese
- V 1241 Stangenwalde †
- V 1242 Marie Henriette
- V 1243 Hohenstein
- V 1244
- V 1245
- V 1246
- V 1247
- V 1248
- V 1249 Mewa VIII †
- V 1250 †
- V 1251
- V 1252 †
- V 1253 Essen
- V 1254 Hermann Garrels †
- V 1255 Ernst Hecht †
- V 1256 Heinrich Onnen †
- V 1256
- V 1257
- V 1258
- V 1259
- V 1260 Gebroeders
- V 1261 Vooruit
- V 1262 Verwachting †
- V 1263
- V 1264
- V 1265 Dr. Eichelbaum
- V 1265
- V 1266
- V 1267
- V 1268
- V 1269 †
- V 1270
- V 1271
- V 1272
- V 1273
- V 1274

=== Losses ===
- V 1201 Juno struck a mine in the North Sea west of Heligoland. She was then attacked and sunk by an Allied de Havilland Mosquito aircraft on 17 September 1944.
- V 1202 Friedrich Suthmeier struck a mine in the North Sea west of Heligoland. She was then attacked and sunk by an Allied de Havilland Mosquito aircraft on 17 September 1944.
- V 1207 P. von Rensen was bombed and sunk in the North Sea off Heligoland by Allied aircraft on 17 April 1945.
- V 1214 Joannes Georgius struck a mine and sank in the North Sea off Sylt, Schleswig-Holstein on 27 September 1944.
- V 1233 Vooruit was sunk in the North Sea by British aircraft on 18 April 1944.
- V 1236 Flevo III struck a mine and sank on 11 July 1942.
- V 1236 Augusta was sunk in the North Sea by British aircraft on 18 April 1944.
- V 1237 Notre Dame de Dunes was sunk in the North Sea by British aircraft on 18 April 1944.
- V 1241 Stangenwalde was sunk in the North Sea off Terschelling, Friesland, Netherlands in a battle with British motor gun boats and motor torpedo boats (MGB 605, MGB 606, MGB 610, MGB 612, MTB 624, MTB 630 and MTB 632) on 1 May 1943.
- V 1249 Mewa VIII struck a mine and sank in the North Sea off Borkum, Lower Saxony on 24 February 1943.
- V 1250 was sunk in an Allied air raid on Wesermünde, Bremen on 2 June 1944.
- V 1252 collided with the flakship FlJ 27 Schiewenhorst and sank in the North Sea off Borkum on 4 April 1943.
- V 1254 Hermann Garrels was torpedoed and sunk in the North Sea off Terschelling by a Royal Navy Motor Torpedo Boat on 5 July 1944.
- V 1255 Ernst Hecht ran aground and was wrecked on 4 January 1945.
- V 1256 Hinrich Onnen was sunk by an Allied aircraft, either with bombs or torpedoes, off Terschelling on 5 July 1945.
- V 1262 Verwachting in 1944.
- V 1269 struck a mine and sank in the North Sea west of Esbjerg, Denmark on 27 August 1944.

== 13 Vorpostenflotille ==
13 Vorpostenflotille was established in September 1939. It was disbanded in January 1945.

- V 1300 Stoomloodsvartuig 17
- V 1301 Uranus
- V 1302 John Mahn – bombed and sunk in the English Channel by Royal Air Force aircraft on 12 February 1942.
- V 1303 Freiburg – sunk in the North Sea off Hook of Holland, South Holland, Netherlands by vessels of the 4th MTB Flotilla, RN on 9 October 1944.
- V 1304 Eisenach – sunk in the North Sea off IJmuiden, North Holland, Netherlands by MTBs 224, 225, 232, 234,241 and 244 on 6 March 1944.
- V 1305 Wuppertal
- V 1306 Otto Krogmann
- V 1307 Stettin – struck the sunken wreck of Heise and sank in the North Sea off IJmuiden on 24 January 1944.
- V 1308 Bredebeck – sunk in the North Sea in a battle with MTB 434 and other vessels of the 54th MTB flotilla on 9 July 1944.
- V 1309 Kapitän Stemmer – collided with V 811 Hugo Homann and sank in the North Sea off Hook of Holland on 28 February 1944.
- V 1310 Deister
- V 1310 Gotland
- V 1311 Döse – torpedoed and sunk in the North Sea off Hook of Holland by Royal Navy Motor Torpedo Boats on 11 May 1944.
- V 1312 Hermann Siebert
- V 1313 Uran
- V 1314 Gustav Hugo Deiters – sunk in the North Sea off Den Helder, North Holland by MTBs 666, 682, 681, 683, 684, 687 and 723 on 9 June 1944.
- V 1315 Karlsburg
- V 1316 Emil Colsmann
- V 1317 Wilhelm Michaelsen
- V 1318 Hans Pickenpack – struck a mine and sank in the North Sea off Vlieland, Friesland, Netherlands on 27 February 1943.
- V 1330 Cyclop
- V 1331 Limburgia
- V 1332 Norma Maria
- V 1333 Zeemeeuw
- V 1334 Witte Zee
- V 1335 Adelante
- V 1336 J. S. Groen
- V 1337 Irene
- V 1337 Victoire
- V 1338 Azimuth
- V 1339 Stoomloodsvartuig 12
- V 1340 Delft – was bombed and sunk at Noordwijk, North Holland on 27 November 1943.

== 14 Vorpostenflotille ==
14 Vorpostenflotille was established on 1 February 1943 and disbanded in 1945.

- V 1401 Deister †
- V 1402 Hermann Siebert
- V 1403 B 1687
- V 1403 Simone Marie
- V 1404 B 1557
- V 1404 Christiane Cécile
- V 1405 Ritzebüttel †
- V 1406 Frankfurt
- V 1407 Kurland
- V 1408 Aue ZRD 16 †
- V 1408 Cyclop
- V 1409 IJM 54
- V 1409 Limburgia †
- V 1410 IJM 6
- V 1410 Norma Maria
- V 1411 ZRD 19
- V 1411 Zeemeeuw †
- V 1412 Witte Zee
- V 1413 IJM 19
- V 1413 Adelante
- V 1414 IJM 130
- V 1414 J. S. Groen
- V 1415 IJM 195
- V 1415 Azimuth †
- V 1416 IJM 89 †
- V 1416 Irene
- V 1417 Stoomloodsvartuig 11 †
- V 1418 Frans Naerebout
- V 1419 Victoire
- V 1420 B 339
- V 1420 Saint Joachim
- V 1421 Deltra II
- V 1422 B 1402
- V 1422 Michel François
- V 1423 B 3059
- V 1423 Emmanuella
- V 1424 Le Cid
- V 1425 LR 3306
- V 1425 Banderole
- V 1426 Antoinette

† Losses:- V 1401 Deister suffered a boiler explosion and sank in the North Sea off IJmuiden, North Holland, Netherlands on 26 April 1944; a vessel designated V 1401 was bombed and sunk at IJmuiden on 24 August 1944. V 1405 Ritzebüttel (as V 2008 Ritzebüttel) struck a mine and sank in the Broad Fourteens off Westkapelle, West Flanders, Belgium on 25 February 1943. Ten crew were killed. V 1408 Aue was torpedoed and sunk in the North Sea off IJmuiden by Bristol Beaufighter aircraft of the Royal Air Force on 29 April 1943. V 1409 Limburgia was torpedoed and sunk in Seine Bay by HMMGB 38 and HMMGB 39 on 18 April 1943. V 1411 Zeemeeuw sank in the North Sea off IJmuiden on 5 July 1944. V 1412 Witte Zee was sunk in the North Sea in a battle with HMMTB 455, HMMTB 457, HMMTB 458, HMMTB 467, HMMTB 468, HMMTB 469 and HMMTB 470 on 14 July 1944. V 1415 Azimuth on 26 March 1944. V 1416 was sunk at IJmuiden by Martin B-26 Marauder aircraft of the United States Eighth Air Force. V 1417 Stoomloodsvartuig 11 was sunk in the North Sea off Terschelling, Friesland, Netherlands by British aircraft on 17 January 1945.

== 15 Vorpostenflotille ==
15 Vorpostenflotille was formed in September 1939. It was disbanded in 1945.

Ship	Armament	Displacement	Propulsion	Service		
Ship	Armament	Displacement	Propulsion	Launched	Commissioned	Fate
V 1501 Wiking 7						Torpedoed and sunk in the English Channel off Cap d'Antifer on 27 September 1943.
V 1502 Wiking 6				1939	1939	Seized by Royal Navy at Emden on 29 October 1945.
V 1503 Wiking 10				1939	1940	Seized by Royal Navy at Emden on 29 October 1945.
V 1504 Wiking 8				1939	1940	Seized by Royal Navy at Emden on 29 October 1945.
V 1505 Wal 8						Bombed and sunk at Le Havre on 15 June 1944.
V 1506 Wal 9						Bombed and sunk in the English Channel off Le Havre on 15 June 1944.
V 1507 Rau VI						Torpedoed and sunk in the Skaggerak by HMS Triton on 15 April 1940.
V 1507 Rau I						Struck a mine and sank in the English Channel off Cap d'Antifer on 12 June 1944.
V 1508 Rau III						Torpedoed and sunk in the English Channel off Boulogne by Royal Navy Torpedo Boat on 23 July 1941.
V 1509 Rau II						Sunk in the English Channel off Cap d'Antifer by enemy action on 5 June 1944.
V 1510 Unitas 6						Struck a wreck and foundered in the English Channel off Dieppe on 2 June 1942.
V 1511 Rau IV						
V 1511 Unitas 7						Sunk in Allied air raid at Le Havre on 14 June 1944.
V 1512 Unitas 8						
V 1513 Linz						
V 1514 Beuthen						Struck a mine and sank in the English Channel off Dieppe on 25 November 1942.
V 1515 Rothienbaum						Bombed at Le Havre on 2 April 1942, raised as M3857 Rothienbaum, sunk again at La Pallice on 16 September 1943.
V 1516 Rouen						
V 1517 Kerdonis II						
V 1520 Loodsboot 6						
V 1521 Vimy						
V 1522 Dauphin						
V 1523 Deltra I		321 GRT, 126 NRT.	Triple expansion steam engine, single screw propeller.	25 March 1920.	1 June 1942.	To 2 Vorpostenflotille, 23 November 1943.
V 1524 Patrice						
V 1525 Eglantine						
V 1530						
V 1531						
V 1532						
V 1533						
V 1534						
V 1535						
V 1536						
V 1537						Sunk in an Allied air raid on Le Havre on 15 June 1944.
V 1538						
V 1539						
V 1540						Sunk in an Allied air raid on Le Havre on 15 June 1944.
V 1541						Sunk in an Allied air raid on Le Havre on 15 June 1944.
V 1548 Gebrüder Kähler						
V 1549 Berlebeck						
V 1549 Hoheweg						

The unit also operated these Flower-class corvettes captured whilst under construction in France.

Ship	Armament	Displacement	Propulsion	Service		
Ship	Armament	Displacement	Propulsion	Launched	Commissioned	Fate
PA 1				16 October 1940	Captured June 1940	Bombed and sunk by Royal Air Force aircraft at Le Havre on 15 June 1944.
PA 2				22 November 1940	Captured June 1940	Bombed and sunk by Royal Air Force aircraft at Le Havre on 15 June 1944.
PA 3				29 November 1940	Captured June 1940	Bombed and sunk by Royal Air Force aircraft at Le Havre on 15 June 1944.
PA 4				Not completed	Captured June 1940	Scuttled as a blockship at Nantes in August 1944.

== 16 Vorpostengruppe ==
16 Vorpostengruppe was formed in July 1940. It was redesignated 16 Vorpostenflotille on 20 September 1940.

Ship	Armament	Displacement	Propulsion	Service		
Ship	Armament	Displacement	Propulsion	Launched	Commissioned	Fate
Koblenz (Schiff 9)						Struck a mine and sank in the North Sea off Bergen, Norway on 11 April 1940.
Altenland (Schiff 18)						
Schleswig (Schiff 37)						

== 16 Vorpostenflotille ==
16 Vorpostenflotille was formed on 20 September 1940. It was disbanded in July 1945.

Ship	Armament	Displacement	Propulsion	Service		
Ship	Armament	Displacement	Propulsion	Launched	Commissioned	Fate
V 1601 Skorpion						
V 1601 Lindormen						
V 1602 La Provence						Struck a mine and sank in the Skaggerak on 5 February 1943.
V 1603 Termidor						
V 1604 Natter						
V 1605 Alma						
V 1605 Mosel						Bombed and sunk in the Skaggerak off Justøy by Canadian Beaufighters on 15 October 1944.
V 1606 Girolou						
V 1606 Julius Fock						Sunk in the Baltic Sea off Steinort by Soviet aircraft on 7 December 1944.
V 1607 Nord Caper						
V 1608 Sülldorf						Sunk off Kristiansand by Beaufighters of 235 and 248 Squadrons and Mosquitoes of 404 Squadron on 14 September 1944.
V 1609 Othmarschen						
V 1610 Innsbruck						Sunk in the Kattegat by Mosquitoes of 235 and 248 Squadrons on 7 March 1945.
V 1611 Forst						
V 1612 Gotha						Sunk in the Kattegat by Mosquitoes of 235 and 248 Squadrons on 7 March 1945.
V 1613 Jane						
V 1613 Riebo						
V 1614 Tormilind						
V 1614 Neerlandia						
V 1615 Tietie						
V 1616 Pirola						
V 1617 Jaweg						
V 1620 KOL 15						
V 1621 SAG 29						
V 1622 PIL 29						
V 1623 PIL 76						

== 17 Vorpostenflotille ==
17 Vorpostenflotille was formed in June 1940. It was disbanded in 1945.

Ship	Armament	Displacement	Propulsion	Service		
Ship	Armament	Displacement	Propulsion	Launched	Commissioned	Fate
V 1701 Unitas 2						Bombed and sunk in Narva Bay by Soviet aircraft on 8 May 1944.
V 1701 Bahrenfeld						
V 1702 Unitas 3						Collided with U-987 and sank in the Baltic Sea on 17 February 1944.
V 1703 Unitas 4						
V 1704 Unitas 5						
V 1705 Rau XI						
V 1706 Rau XII						
V 1707 Wiking 4						Sunk in the Baltic Sea off Kotka by Soviet aircraft on 16 July 1944.
V 1708 Süd III						Incorporated into Royal Netherlands Navy, decommissioned and scrapped in 1962.
V 1709 Wal 1						
V 1710 Natter						
V 1715 Kol 15						
V 1716 SAG 29						
V 1717 PIL 29						
V 1718 PIL 76						

== 18 Vorpostengruppe ==
18 Vorpostengruppe was formed in July 1940. It was redesignated 18 Vorpostenflotille on 3 October 1940.

Ship	Armament	Displacement	Propulsion	Service		
Ship	Armament	Displacement	Propulsion	Launched	Commissioned	Fate
Wega (Schiff 7)		337 GRT, 128 NRT.	Compound steam engine, single screw propeller.	23 December 1931.	29 November 1939.	To 9 Vorpostenflottille, 1 July 1942.
Julius Pickenpack (Schiff 26)						
Wilhelm Huth (Schiff 47)						

== 18 Vorpostenflotille ==
18 Vorpostenflotille was formed on 3 October 1940. It was disbanded in 1945.

Ship	Armament	Displacement	Propulsion	Service		
Ship	Armament	Displacement	Propulsion	Launched	Commissioned	Fate
V 1801 Lutteur						Named O 22 S when she sank in December 1941. She was subsequently salvaged and repaired. She was sunk in an Allied air raid on Kiel, Schleswig-Holstein on 12 April 1944 but was salvaged in December 1944, repaired and returned to service.
V 1801 Wandrahm						
V 1802 Orient						Sunk in the Baltic Sea off Memel, East Prussia by Soviet aircraft on 11 November 1944.
V 1803 Le Havre de Grace						
V 1804 Excellent						
V 1805 Senateur Louis Brindeau						Sunk in an Allied air raid on Le Havre, Seine-Maritime, France on 15 June 1944.
V 1806 Surmulet						
V 1807 Wagram						Struck a mine and sank on 14 August 1942.
V 1808 Dortmund						Struck a mine and sank in the Broad Fourteens on 23 May 1942.
V 1809 Henry P. Newman						
V 1810 Condor						Bombed and sunk in the English Channel off Boulogne, Pas-de-Calais, France on 2 June 1944.
V 1811 Sylt						
V 1812 Halle						
V 1813 Thothn						
V 1814 Linz						Sunk in an Allied air raid on Boulogne on 16 June 1944.
V 1815 Loodsboot 6						Sunk in an Allied air rain on Boulogne on 16 June 1944.
V 1816 Dauphine						
V 1817 Eglantine						

== 19 Vorpostenflotille ==
19 Vorpostenflotille was formed in July 1940. It was redesignated 5 Sicherungsflotille on 1 October 1943. One vessel was redesignated within the unit.

Ship	Armament	Displacement	Propulsion	Service		
Ship	Armament	Displacement	Propulsion	Launched	Commissioned	Fate
V 1901 Präsident Mutzenbecher (V 1924)						
V 1901 Richard Ohlrogge						
V 1902 Amsel						
V 1903 Fink						
V 1904 Stieglitz						
V 1905 Iltis						
V 1906 Gunther						
V 1907 Emden						
V 1908 Kranich						
V 1909 Brunhild						
V 1910 Wellgunde						
V 1911 Johann Georg						
V 1912 Fortuna						
V 1913 Leer						
V 1914 Alma II						
V 1915 Girolou						
V 1916 Weser I						Sank 20 June 1942
V 1921 Habicht						
V 1922 Nürnberg						
V 1923 Ostpreußen						
V 1925 Unitas 9						
V 1926 Ernst Schweckendieck						
V 1927 Johann Wessels						

== 20 Vorpostenflotille ==
20 Vorpostenflotille was formed in July 1940. It was renamed 20 Minensuchflotille post-war.

Ship	Armament	Displacement	Propulsion	Service		
Ship	Armament	Displacement	Propulsion	Launched	Commissioned	Fate
V 2001 Pastor Pype						Wrecked in the Wadden Sea on 5 March 1942. All 28 crew were rescued.
V 2001 Uranus						Sunk in the Baltic Sea by Soviet aircraft on 2 May 1945.
V 2002 Madeleine Louise						Bombed and sunk in the North Sea off Terschelling, Friesland, Netherlands by Lockheed Hudson aircraft of 407 Squadron, Royal Air Force on 15 May 1942.
V 2002 Uran						
V 2003 Loodsboot 7						Torpedoed and sunk in the North Sea off Terschelling by Royal Navy Motor Gun Boats and Motor Torpedo Boats on 1 October 1942.
V 2004 Loodsboot 12						Torpedoed and sunk in the North Sea off IJmuiden, North Holland, Netherlands by a Motor Torpedo Boat on 2 June 1944.
V 2005 Simone Marie						
V 2006 Christine Cécile						
V 2007 Hannover						
V 2008 Ritzebüttel						Struck a mine and sank in the Broad Fourteens off Westkapelle, West Flanders, Belgium on 25 February 1943.
V 2009 Niedersachsen						Sunk in the Scheldt by Royal Navy Motor Torpedo Boats on 25 August 1944.
V 2010 Frankfurt						
V 2011 Borkum						
V 2012 Kurland						
V 2013 Ekwator						
V 2014 Karel						
V 2015						
V 2016						Sunk in the North Sea by Royal Navy Motor Torpedo Boats on 16 October 1944.
V 2017						
V 2018 Vogtland						Struck a mine and was damaged in the North Sea off Terschelling on 28 March 1943. She was taken in tow by V 801 Max Gundelach but struck another mine the next day and sank with the loss of four of her crew.
V 2019 Seefahrt (later named Adolf Hitler)						Bombed and severely damaged in the Scheldt on 28 June 1943 and was beached.
V 2020 Alexander Becker						Torpedoed and sunk in the North Sea off Egmond aan Zee, North Holland by Royal Navy Motor Torpedo Boats on 10 June 1944.
V 2021 Nürnberg						Sunk in the North Sea off Den Helder, North Holland by HMMTB 666, HMMTB 681, HMMTB 683, HMMTB 684, HMMTB 687 and HMMTB 723 on 9 June 1944.
V 2022 Emil Colsmann						Torpedoed and sunk in the Kattegat by the Soviet submarine L-21 on 23 March 1945.
V 2023 Karlsburg						Sunk in an American air raid on Swinemünde on 12 March 1945.

== 51 Vorpostenflotille ==
51 Vorpostenflotille was formed on 23 December 1940. It was disbanded in June 1945. A number of vessels were redesignated within the unit.

Ship	Armament	Displacement	Propulsion	Service		
Ship	Armament	Displacement	Propulsion	Launched	Commissioned	Fate
V 5101 Donner (V 5102)						Shelled and sunk in the Skaggerak by HMS Onslow and HMS Oribi on 27 December 1942.
V 5101 Tornado (V 5105, V 5106)						
V 5101 Blitz (V 5102, V 5103)						Torpedoed and sunk in Nordfjord by Royal Air Force aircraft on 12 December 1944.
V 5102 Orkan (V 5103, V 5104)						
V 5103 Taifun (V 5105, V 5106)						Collided with the Norwegian coaster Fjæra and sank on 9 August 1942.
V 5103 Riese						
V 5104 Wirbel (V 5105)						
V 5106 Sturm (V 5107) ‡						Sunk in a naval battle on 11 February 1944.
V 5106 Sindbad						
V 5107 Sturm ‡‡						Collided with Carl Rehder and sank at Sognesjøen, Sogn og Fjordane, Norway on 16 September 1941.
V 5107 Kormoran						
V 5107 Karmöy						Sunk in Lødingen, Norway by aircraft from HMS Invincible on 20 November 1944.
V 5108 Föhn						Shelled and sunk in the Skaggerak by HMS Oribi on 27 December 1941.
V 5108 Kiebitz						
V 5109 Kranich						
V 5109 Eber						
V 5110 Marabu						
V 5110 Elch						
V 5111 Odin						
V 5112 Tiu						
V 5113 Donar						
V 5114 Baldur						
V 5115 Frija						
V 5116 Unitas 1						

‡ Formerly named Hareidingen.
‡‡ Formerly named Aalesund.

== 53 Vorpostenflotille ==
53 Vorpostenflotille was formed on 23 December 1940. It was disbanded in June 1945. A number of vessels were redesignated within the unit.

Ship	Armament	Displacement	Propulsion	Service		
Ship	Armament	Displacement	Propulsion	Launched	Commissioned	Fate
V 5301 Flamingo (V 5305)						
V 5301 Reiher (V 5302)						
V 5301 Seeteufel						
V 5302 Kranich (V 5303)						
V 5302 Seelöwe						
V 5303 Marabu (V 5306)						
V 5303 Sturmvogel						
V 5303 Seebär						
V 5304 Kormoran (V 5307)						
V 5304 Kiebetz (V 5307)						
V 5304 Seehund						
V 5305 Schnepfe (V 5308)						
V 5305 Jäger						
V 5306 Brachvogel (V 5308) ‡						
V 5306 Schütze						
V 5307 Felix Scheder						Bombed and sunk in the Norwegian Sea off Stad, Norway by Fleet Air Arm aircraft based on HMS Furious and HMS Trumpeter on 12 September 1944.
V 5308 O. B. Rogge						
V 5309 Seerobbe						
V 5310 Seewolf						
V 5311 Seeotter						Struck a mine and sank off "Gejta", Norway on 5 July 1945 with the loss of 23 of her crew.
V 5312 Brachvogel ‡‡						
V 5313 Star XXIII						

- One ship with the pennant number V 5304 was sunk at Lervik, Østfold, Norway by de Havilland Mosquito aircraft of 143 Squadron, Royal Air Force on 15 January 1945.

‡Formerly named Jim.
‡‡ Formerly named Pol VIII.

== 55 Vorpostenflotille ==
55 Vorpostenflotille was formed in December 1940. It was disbanded in June 1945. A number of vessels were redesignated within the unit.

Ship	Armament	Displacement	Propulsion	Service		
Ship	Armament	Displacement	Propulsion	Launched	Commissioned	Fate
V 5501 Bussard						
V 5501 Zick (V 5503, V 5506)						Sunk in Hjeltefjord by de Havilland Mosquito aircraft of 235 and 248 Squadrons, Royal Air Force on 23 October 1944.
V 5501 Ratte						
V 5501 Seeteufel (V 5505, V 5515)						
V 5502 Sperber						
V 5502 M253						
V 5502 Zack (V 5504)						
V 5502 Biber						Sunk in Hjeltefjorden by Bristol Beaufighter and de Havilland Mosquito aircraft of the Banff Strike Wing, Royal Air Force on 24 September 1944.
V 5502 KFK1						
V 5502 Snøgg						Ran aground on the Norwegian coast on 1 September 1943. She sank on 6 September during salvage attempts.
V 5503 Habicht						
V 5503 Otter						
V 5504 Sperber						
V 5504 S12						
V 5504 Marder						
V 5505 Adler						
V 5505 Wiesel						
V 5506 Rabe						
V 5506 Felix Scheder						
V 5506 KFK332						
V 5507 Krähe						
V 5507 O. B. Rogge						
V 5507 S10						
V 5507 Bisam						
V 5508 Elster						
V 5508 Seelöwe						
V 5508 Frettchen						
V 5509 S14						
V 5509 Murmel						
V 5510 S15 (V 5511)						
V 5510 S13						
V 5510 Marabu						
V 5511 S16 (V 5512)						
V 5511 Moskito						
V 5512 Grenadier						
V 5513 Libelle						
V 5514 Hornisse						
V 5515 Ulan						
V 5516 Flamingo						
V 5517 Natter						
V 5518 Reiher						
V 5519 Tarantel						
V 5520 Adler						
V 5525						Sunk in Sognefjord by HNoMS MTB-709 and HNoMS MTB-712 on 2 November 1944.
V 5531						Sunk in Sognefjord by HNoMS MTB-709 and HNoMS MTB-712 on 2 November 1944.

== 57 Vorpostenflotille ==
57 Vorpostenflotille was formed in November 1940. It was disbanded in June 1945. A number of vessels were redesignated within the unit.

Ship	Armament	Displacement	Propulsion	Service		
Ship	Armament	Displacement	Propulsion	Launched	Commissioned	Fate
V 5701 Thüringen						
V 5702 Eupen (V 5706)						
V 5702 Grane						
V 5703 Elsass (V 5705)						
V 5703 Lothringen (V 5704)						
V 5704 Warthegau ( V 5705)						
V 5705 Elsaß						Struck a mine and sank in the Norwegian Sea off Bodø, Nordland, Norway on 27 September 1943.
V 5706 Ostmark						Ran aground and sank on 16 March 1941.
V 5707 Südwind						
V 5711 Steiermark						
V 5712 Kärnten						
V 5713 Sudetenland						
V 5714 Tirol						
V 5715 Skaggerak						
V 5716 Flandern						
V 5717 Fritz Homann						
V 5718 Coburg						Lost on 18 November 1943.
V 5719 Markomanne						
V 5720 Normanne						
V 5721 Turinge						
V 5722 Hornack						Sunk at Rørvik, Nord-Trøndelag, Norway by Allied aircraft on 26 October 1944.
V 5723 Möwe						

== 59 Vorpostenflotille ==
59 Vorpostenflotille was formed in February 1941. It was disbanded in June 1945.

Ship	Armament	Displacement	Propulsion	Service		
Ship	Armament	Displacement	Propulsion	Launched	Commissioned	Fate
V 5901 Bussard						
V 5901 Falkland						
V 5902 Rabe						
V 5902 Polarsonne						
V 5903 Elster						
V 5903 Polarfront						
V 5904 Sperber						
V 5904 Polarnacht						
V 5905 Habicht						
V 5905 Nordriff						Ran aground and was wrecked in Lopphavet on 29 December 1942.
V 5905 Varanger						
V 5906 Krähe						
V 5906 Nordpol						
V 5907 Geier						Shelled and sunk off Lofoten, Norway by HMS Ashanti on 26 December 1941.
V 5907 Südwind						
V 5908 Penang						
V 5908 Togo						
V 5909 Coronel						Struck a mine and sank in Varangerfjord on 1 February 1943.
V 5909 Jan Mayen						
V 5910 Westwind						
V 5911 Gauleiter Bohle						
V 5911 Nordkap						
V 5912 Köln						
V 5912 Polarstern						
V 5913 Wilhelm Söhle						
V 5913 Polarkreis						
V 5914 Vardö						
V 5914 Polarmeer						
V 5915 Heinrich Baumgarten						
V 5916 Yock						
V 5917 Othmarschen						
V 5918 Jane						

== 61 Vorpostenflotille ==
61 Vorpostenflotille was formed in November 1940. It was disbanded in June 1945. A number of vessels were redesignated within the unit.

Ship	Armament	Displacement	Propulsion	Service		
Ship	Armament	Displacement	Propulsion	Launched	Commissioned	Fate
V 6101 Polarfuchs						
V 6101 Nordkap						
V 6101 Gauleiter Bohle						Bombed and sunk in the Norwegian Sea by Soviet Curtiss Kittyhawk, Ilyushin Il-2 and Yakovlev Yak-9 aircraft on 25 September 1944.
V 6101 Wal 10						
V 6102 Köln						Torpedoed and sunk in the North Sea by STS-206 or TKA-205 on 19 August 1944.
V 6102 Polarstern						
V 6102 Wal 11						
V 6103 Nordlicht						
V 6104 Windhuk						
V 6104 Wien						
V 6105 Samoa						
V 6105 Holstein						
V 6106 Kiautschou						
V 6106 Tirol						Torpedoed and sunk in Varangerfjord by Soviet Navy torpedo boats on 12 December 1943.
V 6107 Polarkreis						
V 6107 Wilhelm Söhle						Sunk in Varangerfjord by Soviet aircraft on 17 October 1944.
V 6107 Franke (V 6110, V 6111)						
V 6108 Polarmeer						
V 6108 Vardö						
V 6109 Nordwind						Torpedoed and sunk in Busse Sound by Soviet aircraft on 23 March 1944.
V 6110 Nordkyn						
V 6112 Friese						Torpedoed and sunk off Vardø, Finnmark, Norway by the Soviet submarine M-201 on 19 August 1944.
V 6111 Masuren						Torpedoed and sunk in Korsfjord by Soviet aircraft on 24 October 1944.
V 6112 Gote (V 6113)						Torpedoed and sunk in Kongsfjord by Ilyushin Il-4 aircraft of the Soviet Ninth Guards Regiment.
V 6113 Alane (V 6114)						
V 6114 Duiveland						
V 6114 Eismeer						
V 6115 Salier						
V 6115 Ostwind						Torpedoed and sunk in the Barents Sea off Kiberg, Finnmark by the Soviet submarine M-172 on 1 February 1943.
V 6115 Helgoland						
V 6116 Ubier						Struck a mine and sank in Porsangerfjord on 6 December 1943.
V 6116 Doggerbank						
V 6117 Cherusker						Struck a mine and sank in Porsangerfjord on 6 December 1943.
V 6118 Gallipoli						
V 6119 Auk						

== 63 Vorpostenflotille ==
63 Vorpostenflotille was formed in May 1944. It was disbanded in 1945.

Ship	Armament	Displacement	Propulsion	Service		
Ship	Armament	Displacement	Propulsion	Launched	Commissioned	Fate
V 6301 Krebs						
V 6302 Widder						
V 6303 Steier						
V 6304 Waage						
V 6305 Frauke						
V 6306 Orion						
V 6307 Mob-FD 2 Jupiter						Sunk by Soviet aircraft in Norwegian waters on 17 July 1944.
V 6308 Mob-FD 1 Saturn						
V 6309 Mob-FD 3 Mars						
V 6310 Nordkap						
V 6311 Polarstern						Bombed and sunk in Syltefjord by Soviet aircraft on 22 October 1944.
V 6312 Polarmeer						
V 6313 Westwind						
V 6314 Löwe						
V 6315 Wal 10						
V 6316 Wal 11						
V 6321						
V 6322						
V 6323						
V 6324						
V 6325						
V 6326						
V 6327						
V 6328 Kormoran						
V 6329 Kranich						
V 6330						
V 6331						
V 6332						

== 64 Vorpostenflotille ==
64 Vorpostenflotille was formed in June 1944. It was disbanded in 1945.

Ship	Armament	Displacement	Propulsion	Service		
Ship	Armament	Displacement	Propulsion	Launched	Commissioned	Fate
V 6401 Hagen						
V 6402 Hersing						
V 6403 Hildebrand						
V 6404 Midlum						
V 6405 Hermann						
V 6406 Hundius						
V 6407 Falke						
V 6408 Skagerak						Torpedoed and sunk off Folda, Nord-Trøndelag, Norway by HNoMS Utsira on 16 January 1945.
V 6409 Cimber						
V 6411 Thor						
V 6412 Frigga						
V 6413 Fro						Sunk off Trondheim, Norway by aircraft based on HMS Pursuer on 14 November 1944.
V 6414 Seeschwalbe						
V 6415 Kondor						
V 6416 Albatros						
V 6417 Loki						
V 6421						
V 6422						
V 6423						
V 6424						
V 6425						
V 6426						
V 6427						
V 6428						
V 6429						
V 6430						
V 6431						
V 6432						
V 6433						
V 6434						
V 6435						
V 6436						
V 6437						
V 6438						
V 6439						
V 6440						
V 6441						
V 6442						
V 6443						
V 6444						
V 6445						
V 6446						
V 6447						
V 6448						
V 6449						
V 6450						

== 65 Vorpostenflotille ==
65 Vorpostenflotille was formed in May 1944. It was disbanded in 1945.

Ship	Armament	Displacement	Propulsion	Service		
Ship	Armament	Displacement	Propulsion	Launched	Commissioned	Fate
V 6501 Samoa						
V 6502 Kiautschou						
V 6503 Star 14						
V 6504 Claus Ebeling						
V 6505 Rau IX						
V 6506 Torlyn						
V 6507 Othmarschen						Lost in the Danish Straits on 3 October 1945.
V 6508 Jane						
V 6509 Habicht						
V 6510 Celle						
V 6511 Salier						
V 6512 Togo						
V 6513 Elster						
V 6514 Krähe						
V 6515 Hast I						
V 6516 KFK123						
V 6517						Torpedoed and sunk off northern Norway by the Soviet submarine V-2 on 11 October 1944.
V 6521						
V 6522						
V 6523						
V 6524						
V 6525						
V 6526						
V 6527						
V 6528						
V 6529						
V 6530						
V 6531						
V 6532						
V 6533						
V 6534						
V 6535						
V 6541 Drott						

== 66 Vorpostenflotille ==
66 Vorpostenflotille was formed in May 1944. It was disbanded in 1945.

Ship	Armament	Displacement	Propulsion	Service		
Ship	Armament	Displacement	Propulsion	Launched	Commissioned	Fate
V 6601 Friedrich Wilhelm zu Pferde						
V 6602 Rother Adler						
V 6603 Güldener Löwe						
V 6604 Churprinz						
V 6605 Markgraf von Hindenburg						Lost on 8 March 1945.
V 6606 Wappen von Hamburg						
V 6607 Charlotte Sophie						Lost on 18 June 1945.
V 6608 Steiermark						
V 6609 Kärnten						
V 6610 Sudetenland						
V 6611						
V 6612						
V 6613						
V 6614						
V 6615						
V 6616						
V 6617						
V 6621 Dorothea						
V 6622 Rummelpott						

== 67 Vorpostenflotille ==
67 Vorpostenflotille was formed on 1 July 1944. It was disbanded in 1945.

Ship	Armament	Displacement	Propulsion	Service		
Ship	Armament	Displacement	Propulsion	Launched	Commissioned	Fate
V 6701 Rotges						
V 6702 Windhuk						
V 6703						
V 6704						Scuttled at Vadsø, Finnmark, Norway on 15 October 1944.
V 6705						
V 6706						
V 6707						Sunk at Kirkenes, Finnmark by Soviet aircraft on 16 October 1944.
V 6708						
V 6709						
V 6710						
V 6711						
V 6712						
V 6713						
V 6714						
V 6715						
V 6716						
V 6717						
V 6718						
V 6719						Struck a mine and sank in the Baltic Sea off Swinemünde, Pomerania on 26 September 1944.
V 6720						
V 6721						
V 6722						
V 6723						
V 6724						
V 6725						
V 6726						
V 6728 Kormoran						
V 6729 Kranich						
V 6730 Polarfuchs						
V 6731						
V 6732						
V 6733 Widder						Sunk by Allied aircraft at Horten, Vestfold, Norway on 23 February 1945.
V 6734 Stier						
V 6735 Löwe						

== 68 Vorpostenflotille ==
68 Vorpostenflotille was formed in May 1944. It was disbanded in 1945.

Ship	Armament	Displacement	Propulsion	Service		
Ship	Armament	Displacement	Propulsion	Launched	Commissioned	Fate
V 6801 Viking						Sunk in Ålesund by Bristol Beaufighter aircraft of the Royal Air Force on 17 October 1944.
V 6802 Flame						
V 6803 Burgunder						Lost on 17 August 1944.
V 6804 Sachse						
V 6805 Geuse						
V 6806 Alemanne						
V 6807 Teutone						
V 6808 Rugier						
V 6811						
V 6812						
V 6813						
V 6814						
V 6815						
V 6816						

== 7 and 13 Sicherungsflotille ==
7 Sicherungflotille was formed in February 1943 and was expanded in March 1943. It was disbanded in October 1944 and its vessels transferred to 13 Sicherungflotille, which was disbanded on 24 April 1945.

Ship	Armament	Displacement	Propulsion	Service		
Ship	Armament	Displacement	Propulsion	Launched	Commissioned	Fate
V 7001 Francis Simone						
V 7002 Ste Jeanne d'Arc						
V 7003 Petit Jesus						
V 7004 St Joseph						
V 7005 St Casimir						
V 7006 St Louis						
V 7007 A la Volonté de Dieux						
V 7008 St Raphael						
V 7009 St Antonie						
V 7010 Volonté de la Vierge Marie						
V 7011 Phoque						
V 7012 Jeanne et Marie						
V 7013 Louise Elise						
V 7014 Jesus Nazareth						
V 7015 Ste Madeleine						
V 7016 Joseph François						
V 7017 St Come et Damien						
V 7018 St Christophe						
V 7019 SG 2						
V 7020						
V 7021						
V 7022						
