= German trawler V 202 Franz Westermann =

German Vorpostenboot of World War II

History
- Name: Franz Westermann (1937–54); Pommern (1954–60)
- Owner: Reederei Siebert & Co (1937–39); Kriegsmarine (1939–44); Cuxhavener Hochseefischerei (1954–60)
- Port of registry: (Nazi Germany) Wesermünde, Germany (1937–39); Kriegsmarine (1939–44); Germany (1948–49); West Germany (1949–54); Cuxhaven, West Germany (1954–60)
- Builder: Seebeck G. Ag. - Weser Werk Seebeckwerft
- Yard number: 600
- Launched: November 1937
- Completed: 30 December 1937
- Commissioned: 1 October 1939
- Out of service: 15 June 1944 – 1948
- Identification: Code Letters DFDI; Fishing boat registration PG 521 (1937–39); Pennant Number V 202 (1939); Pennant Number V 205 (1939–44); Fishing boat registration BX 297 (1948–60)
- Fate: Scrapped 1962

General characteristics
- Type: Fishing trawler (1937–39, 1948-60); Vorpostenboot (1939–44)
- Tonnage: 481 GRT, 178 NRT
- Length: 50.80 m (166 ft 8 in)
- Beam: 50.80 m (166 ft 8 in)
- Depth: 3.96 m (13 ft 0 in)
- Installed power: Triple expansion steam engine, 96nhp
- Propulsion: Scew propeller
- Speed: 12 knots (22 km/h; 14 mph)

V 202 Franz Westermann (later V 205 Franz Westermann) was a German trawler built in 1937 which was converted into a Vorpostenboot for the Kriegsmarine during World War II. She was sunk at Saint Peter Port, Guernsey, Channel Islands in an allied air raid on15 June 1944. Repaired post-war, she was renamed Pommern in 1954 and served until 1960.

== Description ==
Franz Westermann was 50.80 metres (166 ft 8 in) long, with a beam of 8.03 metres (26 ft 4 in) and a depth of 3.96 metres (13 ft 0 in). It was assessed at 481 GRT, 178 NRT. The ship was powered by a triple expansion steam engine, which had cylinders of 35 centimetres (13 3/4 in), 55 centimetres (21 5/8 in) and 90.0 centimetres (35 7/16 in) diameter by 64.9 centimetres (25 9/16 in) stroke. The engine was built by Deschimag, Wesermünde and was rated at 96nominal horsepower. It drove a single screw propeller.

== History ==
Franz Westermann was constructed as yard number 599 by Deschimag Seebeck in Bremerhaven as a fishing trawler. She was launched in November 1937 and completed on 28 December. She was built for Reederei Siebert & Co, Wesermünde. The Code Letters DFDI were allocated, as was the fishing boat registration PG 521. On 6 October 1940, the Kriegsmarine requisitioned the vessel and commissioned it as a Vorpostenboot in the 2 Vorpostenflotille under the designation V 202 Franz Westermann. It was redesignated V 205 Franz Westermann on 20 October. With the rest of the 2 Vorpostenflotille, Franz Westermann operated in the North Sea from 1939 to 1940 and in the English Channel from 1940 to 1944.

V 202 Franz Westermann was sunk in an Allied air raid on St. Peter Port, Guernsey on 15 June 1944. She was refloated and repaired in 1948, receiving the fishing boat registration BX 297. Franz Westermann was renamed Pommern on 28 June 1954 and was then homeported at Cuxhaven. She was then owned by the Cuxhavener Hochseefischerei. She was sold to W. Ritscher, Hamburg for breaking on 30 April 1962.
