= German trawler V 201 Seydlitz =

German Vorpostenboot of World War II

History

Nazi Germany
- Name: Seydlitz
- Namesake: Friedrich Wilhelm von Seydlitz
- Owner: F. A. Pust Hochseefischerei AG (1936–39); Kriegsmarine (1939–44)
- Port of registry: (Nazi Germany) Wesermünde (1936–39); Kriegsmarine (1939–44)
- Builder: Seebeck G. Ag. - Weser Werk Seebeckwerft
- Yard number: 570
- Launched: 1936
- Commissioned: 1939
- Identification: Code Letters DFCP; Fishing boat registration PG 508 (1936–39); Pennant Number V 201 (1939); Pennant Number V 211 (1939–1944)
- Fate: Sunk in the English Channel off Barfleur by British aircraft on 20 March 1944.

General characteristics
- Type: Converted trawler
- Tonnage: 449 GRT, 167 NRT
- Length: 49.40 m (162 ft 1 in)
- Beam: 8.03 m (26 ft 4 in)
- Depth: 7.72 m (25 ft 4 in)
- Installed power: 96 PS (71 kW; 95 ihp) / 98nhp
- Propulsion: 1 × 3 cyl. triple expansion steam engine with LP exhaust turbine & DR gearing & hydraulic coupling, single shaft, 1 screw propeller
- Speed: 11.9 knots (22.0 km/h; 13.7 mph)
- Complement: ~27

Seydlitz was a German trawler built in 1936 which was converted into a Vorpostenboot for the Kriegsmarine during World War II, serving as V 201 Seydlitz and V 211 Seydlitz. She was bombed and sunk off the Channel Islands on 20 March 1944.

== Description ==
Seydlitz was 49.40 metres (162 ft 1 in) long, with a beam of 8.03 metres (26 ft 4 in) and a depth of 3.76 metres (12 ft 4 in). It was assessed at 449 GRT, 167 NRT. It was powered by a triple expansion steam engine which had cylinders of 36.0 centimetres (14 3/16 in), 55 centimetres (21 5/8 in) and 90.0 centimetres (35 7/16 in) diameter by 64.9 centimetres (25 9/16 in) stroke. The engine was built by Deschimag, Wesermünde. It was rated at 98nhp, giving a speed of 10.5 knots (19.4 km/h).

== History ==
In 1936, Seydlitz was constructed as yard number 570 by the German shipbuilder Seebeckwerft AG as a civilian fishing trawler for F. A. Pust Hochseefischerei AG, Wesermünde. The Code Letters DFCP were allocated, as was the fishing boat registration PG 508. On 1 October 1939, the Kriegsmarine requisitioned the vessel and commissioned it as a Vorpostenboot in the 2 Vorpostenflotille under the designation V 201 Seydlitz. The ship was redesignated V 211 Seydlitz on 20 October. With the rest of the 2 Vorpostenflotille, Seydlitz operated in the North Sea from 1939 to 1940 and in the English Channel from 1940 to 1944.

Seydlitz was sunk by British fighter-bombers on 20 March 1944 in the English Channel between Guernsey, Channel Islands and Barfleur, Manche, France. Twenty-seven crew were killed. The wreck now lies where it was sunk approximately 50 metres (160 ft) below the surface.
