= German trawler V 605 Arthur Duncker =

History
- Name: Arthur Duncker
- Owner: Kämpf & Meyer (1924–29); C. Kämpf (1929–38); Schmielau (1938–39); Kriegsmarine (1939–44)
- Port of registry: (Weimar Republic) Wesermünde, Germany (1924–33); (Nazi Germany) Wesermünde, Germany (1933–38); (Nazi Germany) Hamburg, Germany (1938–39); Kriegsmarine (1939–44)
- Builder: J. C. Tecklenborg AG, Geestemünde
- Yard number: 404
- Launched: 28 October 1924
- Completed: 15 November 1924
- Commissioned: 22 September 1939
- Identification: Fishing boat registration PG 359 (1924–39); Code Letters RGCB (1924–34); Fishing boat registration HH 250 (1938–39); Code Letters DEZT (1934–44); Pennant Number V 707 (1939–43); Pennant Number V 605 (1943–44)
- Fate: Mined 14 August 1944

General characteristics
- Type: Fishing trawler (1924–39); Vorpostenboot (1939–44)
- Tonnage: 278 GRT, 107 NRT
- Length: 40.72 m (133 ft 7 in)
- Beam: 7.37 metres (24 ft 2 in)
- Depth: 3.68 m (12 ft 1 in)
- Installed power: Triple expansion steam engine, 56nhp
- Propulsion: Single screw propeller
- Speed: 10 knots (19 km/h)

Arthur Duncker was a German fishing trawler which was built in 1924. She was requisitioned by the Kriegsmarine during the Second World War. She was used as a Vorpostenboot. She struck a mine and sank in August 1944.

== Description ==
The ship 40.72 m (133 ft 7 in) long, with a beam of 7.37 metres (24 ft 2 in). She had a depth of 3.68 m (12 ft 1 in). She was assessed at 278 GRT, 107 NRT. She was powered by a triple expansion steam engine, which had cylinders of 33 centimetres (13 in), 53 centimetres (20 7/8 in) and 86 centimetres (33 7/8 in) diameter by 73 centimetres (28 5/8 in) stroke. The engine was built by J. C. Tecklenborg AG., Geestemünde, Germany. It was rated at 55 nhp. It drove a single screw propeller. It could propel the ship at 10 knots (19 km/h).

== History ==
Arthur Duncker was built as yard number 404 by J. C. Tecklenborg AG., Geestemünde, Germany. She was launched on 28 October 1924 and completed on 15 November. Owned by Kämpf & Meyer, her port of registry was Wesermünde. She was allocated the Code Letters RGCB, and the fishing boat registration PG 359. She was sold to the Hochseefischerei Cark Kämpf Partenreederei in April 1929. In 1934, her Code Letters were changed to DEZT. On 25 April 1938, she was sold to Schmielau, Hamburg. Her fishing boat registration was changed to HH 250.

On 22 September 1939, Arthur Duncker was requisitioned by the Kriegsmarine. Designated as a vorpostenboot. She was allocated to 7 Vorpostenflotille as V 707 Arthur Duncker. On 10 December 1943, she was reallocated to 6 Vorpostenflotille as V 605 Arthur Duncker. On 14 August 1944, she and the minesweeper M 4463 struck mines and sank in the English Channel west of La Pallice, Charente-Inférieure, France.
