= German trawler V 310 Rosemarie =

History
- Name: Rosemarie
- Owner: Hochseefischerei J. Wieting AG (1924–34); Nordsee Deutsche Hochseefischerei Bremen-Cuxhaven AG (1934–41); Kriegsmarine (1941–45); Nordsee Deutsche Hochseefischerei Bremen-Cuxhaven AG (1945–52)
- Port of registry: (Weimar Republic) Bremerhaven, Germany (1924–33); (Nazi Germany) Bremerhaven, Germany (1933–34); (Nazi Germany) Nordenham, Germany (1934–41); Kriegsmarine (1941–45); Nordenham, Allied-occupied Germany (1945–49); Nordenham, West Germany (1949–52)
- Builder: Reiherstieg Schiffswerfte & Maschinenfabrik
- Yard number: 460
- Launched: September 1924
- Completed: November 1924
- Commissioned: 29 April 1941
- Decommissioned: 18 April 1945
- Identification: Code Letters QVED (1924–34); Fishing boat registration BX 173 (1924–30); Fishing boat registration ON 124 (1930–34); Code Letters DNOG (1934–52); Fishing boat registration PG 461 (1934–41); Pennant Number V 310 (1941–45); Fishing boat registration PG 416 (1945–48); Fishing boat registration BX 335 (1948-52)
- Fate: Scrapped

General characteristics
- Class & type: Fishing trawler (1924–41, 1945–52); Vorpostenboot (1941–45)
- Tonnage: 292 GRT, 112 NRT
- Length: 43.90 m (144 ft 0 in)
- Beam: 7.35 m (24 ft 1 in)
- Draught: 3.35 m (11 ft 0 in)
- Depth: 4.16 m (13 ft 8 in)
- Installed power: Triple expansion steam engine, 64nhp
- Propulsion: Single screw propeller
- Speed: 10 knots (19 km/h)

Rosemarie was a German fishing trawler that was requisitioned in the Second World War by the Kriegsmarine for use as a Vorpostenboot, serving as V 310 Rosemarie. She was returned to her owners post-war and served until 1952.

== Description ==
The ship was 43.90 metres (144 ft 0 in) long, with a beam of 7.35 metres (24 ft 1 in). She had a depth of 4.16 metres (13 ft 8 in) and a draught of 3.35 metres (11 ft 0 in). She was assessed at 292 GRT, 112 NRT. She was powered by a triple expansion steam engine, which had cylinders of 35 centimetres (13 3/4 in), 55 centimetres (21 3/4 in) and 91 centimetres (35 3/4 in) diameter by 65 centimetres (25 3/4 in) stroke. The engine was built by Seebeckwerft, Wesermünde, Germany. It was rated at 64nhp. It drove a single screw propeller, and could propel the ship at 10 knots (19 km/h).

== History ==
Rosemarie was built as yard number 460 by G. Seebeck AG, Wesermünde, Germanay for the Hochseefischerei J. Wieting AG Bremerhaven. She was launched in September 1924 and completed in November. The Code Letters QVED were allocated, as was the fishing boat registration BX 173. On 16 June 1930, her registration was changed to ON 124. On 4 September 1934, her registration was changed to PG 461. She was sold to the Nordsee Deutsche Hochseefischerei Bremen-Cuxhaven AG on 10 November 1934. Her port of registry was changed to Nordenham. In 1934 her Code Letters were changed to DNOG.

On 29 April 1941, Rosemarie was requisitioned by the Kriegsmarine for use as a vorpostenboot. She was allocated to 3 Vorpostenflotille, serving as V 310 Rosemarie. On 11 November 1944, She was towing V 1802 Orient when the ships were attacked off Memel by Allied aircraft. V 1802 Orient sank with the loss of twenty lives. On 18 April 1945, she was returned to her owners. In 1948, her registration was changed to BX 335. She was sold for breaking in Hamburg on 31 December 1952.

== Sources ==
- Gröner, Erich (1993). Die deutschen Kriegsschiffe 1815-1945 (in German). Vol. 8/I: Flußfahrzeuge, Ujäger, Vorpostenboote, Hilfsminensucher, Küstenschutzverbände (Teil 1). Koblenz: Bernard & Graefe. ISBN 3-7637-4807-5.
