= German trawler V 201 Gebrüder Kähler =

History
- Name: Gebrüder Kähler
- Owner: Hinrich Foch Hochseefischerei AG (1937–39); Kriegsmarine (1939–40)
- Port of registry: (Nazi Germany) Hamburg, Germany (1937–39); Kriegsmarine (1939–40)
- Builder: H. C. Stülcken Sohn
- Yard number: 722
- Launched: 20 October 1937
- Completed: December 1937
- Out of service: 5 September 1940
- Identification: Code Letters DJVD; Fishing boat registration HH 234 (1937–39); Pennant Number V 208 (1939); Pennant Number V 201 (1939–40)
- Fate: Struck a mine and sank 5 September 1940

General characteristics
- Type: Fishing trawler (1937–39); Vorpostenboot (1939–40)
- Tonnage: 460 GRT, 170 NRT
- Length: 49.53 m (162 ft 6 in)
- Beam: 8.10 m (26 ft 7 in)
- Depth: 3.84 m (12 ft 7 in)
- Installed power: Triple expansion steam engine
- Propulsion: Single screw propeller
- Speed: 12 knots (22 km/h)

Gebrüder Kähler was a German fishing trawler that was requisitioned by the Kriegsmarine in the Second World War for use as a Vorpostenboot. She struck a mine and sank in the Westerschelde on 5 September 1940.

== Description ==
Gebrüder Kähler was 49.53 metres (162 ft 6 in) long, with a beam of 8.10 metres (26 ft 7 in) and a depth of 3.84 metres (12 ft 7 in). She was assessed at 460 GRT, 170 NRT. She was powered by a triple expansion steam engine, which had cylinders of 35 centimetres (13 3/4 in), 55 centimetres (21 5/8 in) and 88 centimetres (34 5/8 in) diameter by 66 centimetres (26 in) stroke. The engine was built by H. C. Stülcken Sohn, Hamburg. It was rated at 154nhp and drove a single screw propeller via a low pressure turbine, double reduction gearing and a hydraulic coupling. It could propel her at 12 knots (22 km/h).

== History ==
Gebrüder Kähler was built as yard number 722 by H. C. Stülcken Sohn, Hamburg. She was launched on 20 October 1937 and completed in December. She was built for Hinrich Foch Hochseefischerei AG, Hamburg. The Code Letters DJVD were allocated, as was the fishing boat registration HH 234.

On 24 September 1939, Gebrüder Kähler was requisitioned by the Kriegsmarine for use as a Vorpostenboot. She was allocated to 2 Vorpostenflotille as V 208 Gebrüder Kähler. On 20 October, she was redesignated as V 201 Gebrüder Kähler. On 5 September 1940, she struck a mine and sank in the Westerschelde.
