= German trawler V 314 Heinrich Lehnert =

History
- Name: Viceadmiral E. Schmidt (1918–19); Heinrich Lehnert (1919–50)
- Namesake: Ehrhard Schmidt
- Owner: Kaiserliche Marine (1918–19); Grundmann & Gröschel (1919–41); Kriegsmarine (1941–45); Grundmann & Gröschel (1945–50)
- Port of registry: Imperial German Navy (1918–19); (Weimar Republic) Wesermünde, Germany (1919–33); (Nazi Germany) Wesermünde, Germany (1933–41); Kriegsmarine (1941–45); Wesermünde, Allied-occupied Germany (1945–49); Wesermünde, West Germany (1949-50)
- Builder: Schiffsbau & Maschinenfabrik Hansa AG
- Yard number: 109
- Launched: September 1918
- Completed: November 1918
- Commissioned: November 1918; April 1941
- Decommissioned: March 1919; August 1945
- Out of service: 1950
- Identification: Code Letters KRFP (1919–34); Fishing boat registration PG 285 (1919–41); Code Letters DEXV (1934–54); Pennant Number V 314 (1941–43); Pennant Number Vs 314 (1943–45); Fishing boat registration BX 319 (1945–50)
- Fate: Scrapped

General characteristics
- Type: Fishing trawler (1929–41); Vorpostenboot (1941–45); Fishing trawler (1945–54)
- Tonnage: ~250 GRT (1918–27); 269 GRT, 103 NRT (1927–50)
- Length: 38.25 m (125 ft 6 in) (1918–27); 40.87 metres (134 ft 1 in) (1927–50)
- Beam: 7.06 m (23 ft 2 in)
- Draught: 3.70 m (12 ft 2 in)
- Depth: 4.15 m (13 ft 7 in)
- Installed power: Triple expansion steam engine, 96nhp
- Propulsion: Single screw propeller
- Speed: 10 knots (19 km/h)

Heinrich Lehnert was a German fishing trawler that was built in 1918 as SMS Viceadmiral E. Schmidt for the Kaiserliche Marine. She was sold and renamed Heinrich Lennert in 1919. She was requisitioned by the Kriegsmarine in the Second World War for use as a Vorpostenboot, serving as V 314 Heinrich Lehnert and later as the Vorpostensicherungsboot Vs 314 Heinrich Lehnert. Returned to her owners post-war, she was scrapped in 1950.

== Description ==
As built, the ship 38.24 metres (125 ft 6 in) long, with a beam of 7.06 metres (23 ft 2 in). She had a depth of 4.15 metres (13 ft 7 in) and a draught of 3.70 metres (12 ft 2 in). She was assessed at about 250 GRT. She was powered by a triple expansion steam engine, which had cylinders of 34 centimetres (13 3/8 in), 55 centimetres (21 5/8 in) and 90 centimetres (35 3/8 in) diameter by 65 centimetres (25 5/8 in) stroke. The engine was built by G. Seebeck AG, Wesermünde, Germany. It was rated at 63nhp. It drove a single screw propeller. It could propel the ship at 10 knots (19 km/h).

== History ==
Viceadmiral E. Schmidt was built as yard number 109 by Schiffsbau & Maschinenfabrik Hansa AG, Tönning for the Kaiserliche Marine. She was launched in September 1918 and completed in November. She saw no active service and was sold on 24 March 1919 to Grundmann & Gröschel and was renamed Heinrich Lehnert. The fishing boat registration PG 285 was allocated, as were the Code Letters KRFP. Her port of registry was Wesermünde. In 1927, she was lengthened to 40.87 metres (134 ft 1 in). She was now assessed at 269 GRT, 103 NRT. In 1934, her Code Letters were changed to DEXV.

She was scheduled to have participated in Unternehmen Seelöwe in 1940. On 27 April 1941, Eifel was requisitioned by the Kriegsmarine for use as a vorpostenboot. She was allocated to 3 Vorpostenflotille as V 314 Heinrich Lehnert. On 1 October 1943, she was redesignated as a Vorpostensicherungsboot, serving as Vs 314 Heinrich Lehnert. In 1945, she was returned to her owners. The fishing boat registration BX 319 was allocated. She arrived at Leth & Co, Hamburg for scrapping on 28 August 1950.

== Sources ==
- Gröner, Erich (1993). Die deutschen Kriegsschiffe 1815-1945 (in German). Vol. 8/I: Flußfahrzeuge, Ujäger, Vorpostenboote, Hilfsminensucher, Küstenschutzverbände (Teil 1). Koblenz: Bernard & Graefe. ISBN 3-7637-4807-5.
