= German trawler V 604 Fritz Reiser =

German fishing trawler used during WW2

History
- Name: Fritz Reiser (1924–47); Le Merlu (1947–54)
- Owner: Kämpf & Meyer (1924–29); C. Meyer (1929–39); Kriegsmarine (1939–44); Pool de Lorient (1944–54)
- Port of registry: (Weimar Republic) Wesermünde, Germany (1923–33); (Nazi Germany) Wesermünde, Germany (1933–39); Kriegsmarine (1939–44); Lorient, France (1944–54)
- Builder: J. C. Tecklenborg AG, Geestemünde
- Yard number: 405
- Launched: 15 November 1924
- Completed: 4 December 1924
- Commissioned: 22 September 1939
- Identification: Fishing boat registration PG 360 (1924–39); Code Letters KSCF (1924–34); Code Letters DEZU (1934–43); Pennant Number V 706 (1939–43); Pennant Number V 604 (1943–44); Codel Letters FNFN (1944–54)
- Fate: Scrapped 1954

General characteristics
- Type: Fishing trawler (1924–39, 1944–52); Vorpostenboot (1939–44); School ship (1952–54)
- Tonnage: 278 GRT, 107 NRT
- Length: 40.72 m (133 ft 7 in)
- Beam: 7.37 metres (24 ft 2 in)
- Depth: 3.68 m (12 ft 1 in)
- Installed power: Triple expansion steam engine, 56nhp
- Propulsion: Single screw propeller
- Speed: 10 knots (19 km/h)

Fritz Reiser was a German fishing trawler which was built in 1924. She was requisitioned by the Kriegsmarine during the Second World War. She was used as a Vorpostenboot. She was seized by France in 1944, and was renamed Le Merlu in 1948. She was scrapped in 1954.

== Description ==
The ship 40.72 m (133 ft 7 in) long, with a beam of 7.37 metres (24 ft 2 in). She had a depth of 3.68 m (12 ft 1 in). She was assessed at 278 GRT, 107 NRT. She was powered by a triple expansion steam engine, which had cylinders of 33 centimetres (13 in), 53 centimetres (20 7/8 in) and 86 centimetres (33 7/8 in) diameter by 72 centimetres (28 3/8 in) stroke. The engine was built by J. C. Tecklenborg AG., Geestemünde, Germany. It was rated at 55 nhp. It drove a single screw propeller. It could propel the ship at 10 knots (19 km/h).

== History ==
Fritz Reiser was built as yard number 405 by J. C. Tecklenborg AG., Geestemünde, Germany. She was launched on 15 November 1924 and completed on 4 December. Owned by Kämpf & Meyer, her port of registry was Wesermünde. She was allocated the Code Letters KSCF, and the fishing boat registration PG 360. She was sold to the Hochseefischerei Cark Kämpf Partenreederei in 1929. On 6 April 1932, her boilers were damaged at sea, leaving her drifting 80 nautical miles (150 km) north of the Horns Reef. She radioed of a tow. In 1934, her Code Letters were changed to DEZU.

On 22 September 1939, Fritz Reiser was requisitioned by the Kriegsmarine. Designated as a vorpostenboot. She was allocated to 7 Vorpostenflotille as V 706 Fritz Reiser. On 19 August 1943, she was reallocated to 6 Vorpostenflotille as V 604 Fritz Reiser. In 1944, she was seized at Saint-Nazaire as a prize of war by France. She was sold to the Pool de Lorient. Her port of registry was Lorient, Morbihan and the Code Letters FNFN were allocated. Her name was changed to Le Merlu in 1947. She became a school ship in 1953 and was scrapped in 1954.
