= German trawler V 1502 Wiking 6 =

German Vorpostenboot built in 1939

History
- Name: Wiking 6 (1939–1945); Empire Viking VI (1945–1946); Slava II (1946– )
- Owner: Deutsche Ölmülen Rohstoffe GmbH (1939); Kriegsmarine (1939–1945); Ministry of War Transport (1945–1946); Ministry of Transport (1946); Soviet Union (1946– )
- Operator: Hamburger Walfang Kantor GmbH (1939); Kriegsmarine (1939–1945); United Whalers (1945–1946); Soviet Union (1946– )
- Port of registry: Hamburg, Germany (1939); Kriegsmarine (1939–1945); London, United Kingdom (1945–1946); Soviet Union (1946– )
- Builder: Deutsche Schiff- und Maschinenbau, Bremen
- Launched: 1939
- Commissioned: 1940
- Identification: Code Letters DKAP (1939); Pennant number V 1502 (1939–1940); Pennant number FlJ 24 (1940-45); Code Letters GSBX (1945-46)

General characteristics
- Class & type: Whaling trawler (1939, 1945– ); Vorpostenboot (1939–1940); Flakjäger (1940–1945); Empire ship (1945–1946)
- Tonnage: 381 GRT, 127 NRT
- Length: 42.55 m (139 ft 7 in)
- Beam: 8.08 m (26 ft 6 in)
- Depth: 3.96 m (13 ft 0 in)
- Installed power: 217 nhp
- Propulsion: Triple expansion steam engine

V 1502 Wiking 6 was a German Vorpostenboot built in 1939 as the whaler Wiking 6. Requisition by the Kriegsmarine, she served throughout World War II as V 1502 Wiking 6 and the Flakjäger FlJ 24 Wiking 6 before being seized by the Royal Navy at Emden on 29 October 1945 and renamed Empire Viking VI. Allocated to the Soviet Union in 1946, she was renamed Slava II.

== Description ==
The ship was 42.55 metres (139 ft 7 in) long, with a beam of 8.08 metres (26 ft 6 in) and a depth of 3.96 metres (13 ft 0 in). She was powered by a triple expansion steam engine which had cylinders of 43 cm (16 15/16 in), 72 cm (28 3/8 in) and 120 cm (47 1/4 in) diameter by 68 cm (26 3/4 in) stroke. It drove a single screw propeller and was rated at 217 nhp.

== History ==
Wiking 6 was built as a whaler by Deutsche Schiff- und Maschinenbau, Wesermünde for Deutsche Ölmülen Rohstoffe GmbH, Hamburg. Her port of registry was Hamburg and the Code Letters DKAP were allocated. She was operated under the management of the Hamburger Walfang Kantor GmbH. In 1939, she was requisitioned by the Kriegsmarine, serving from 25 October with 15 Vorpostenflotille as the Vorpostenboot V 1502 Wiking 6. She was redesignated as a Flakjäger in 1940, serving as the Flakjäger FlJ 24 Wiking 6.

On 29 October 1945, FlJ 24 Wiking 6 was seized by the Royal Navy as a prize of war at Emden. She was passed to the Ministry of War Transport and renamed Empire Viking VI. The Code Letters GSBX were allocated and her port of registry was changed to London. She was sent to the Southern Ocean in November 1945. On 7 December, she was allocated to the Soviet Union by the Tripartite Merchant Marine Commission in Berlin. She was handed over to the Soviet Union in September 1946 in London. She was renamed Slava II.

== Possible fate ==
Slava II may have been in service until 2012. On 31 October 2012, a ship of that name was severely damaged by fire at Kachemak, Alaska, United States when a man tried to commit suicide on board by pouring flammable liquid over himself and setting fire to it.

== See also ==
- List of Vorpostenboote in World War II
- List of Empire ships (U–Z)
