= German trawler V 811 Hugo Homann =

History

Nazi Germany
- Name: Hugo Homann
- Fate: Struck a mine in the Ems estuary and sank on 6 May 1940.

General characteristics
- Class & type: Converted trawler
- Tonnage: 383 grt

V 811 Hugo Homann was a German trawler which was converted into a Vorpostenboot for the Kriegsmarine during World War II. She was a part of the 8 Vorpostenflotille and participated in the German invasion of Norway. She was sunk by an air mine at the mouth of the Ems estuary on May 6, 1940.
