= German trawler V 804 Spica =

History
- Name: Spica
- Owner: Hochseefischerei Nordstern AG (1930–39, 1945–55); Kriegsmarine (1939–45)
- Port of registry: (Weimar Republic) Wesermünde, Germany (1930–33); (Nazi Germany) Wesermünde, Germany (1933-39); Kriegsmarine (1939–45); Wesermünde, Allied-occupied Germany (1945–49); Wesermünde, West Germany (1949–55)
- Builder: Schiffbau-Gesellschaft Unterweser AG
- Yard number: 244
- Launched: 5 November 1930
- Completed: 2 December 1930
- Commissioned: 17 September 1939
- Decommissioned: May 1945
- Identification: Code Letter KRGN (1930–34); Fishing boat registration PG 404 (1930–39, 1945–48); Code Letters DFBS (1934–55); Pennant number V 214 (1939); Pennant number V 804 (1939–45); Fishing boat registration BX 383 (1948–55)
- Fate: Scrapped

General characteristics
- Class & type: Fishing trawler (1930–39, 1945–55); Vorpostenboot (1939–45)
- Tonnage: 325 GRT, 123 NRT
- Length: 43.53 m (142 ft 10 in)
- Beam: 8.10 m (26 ft 7 in)
- Draught: 3.77 m (12 ft 4 in)
- Depth: 4.65 m (15 ft 3 in)
- Installed power: Compound steam engine, 62 nhp
- Propulsion: Single screw propeller
- Speed: 11 knots (20 km/h; 13 mph)

Spica was a German fishing trawler that was requisitioned by the Kriegsmarine in the Second World War for use as a vorpostenboot, Serving as V 214 Spica and V 804 Spica. She returned to service as a fishing trawler post-war and was scrapped in 1955.

== Description ==
Spica was 43.53 metres (142 ft 10 in) long, with a beam of 8.10 metres (26 ft 7 in).She had a depth of 4.65 metres (15 ft 3 in) and a draught of 3.77 metres (12 ft 4 in). She was assessed at 325 GRT, 123 NRT. She was powered by a compound steam engine, which had two cylinders each of 31 centimetres (12 3/8 in) and 68 centimetres (26 3/4 in) diameter by 68 centimetres (26 3/4 in) stroke. The engine was built by Christiansen & Meyer, Harburg, Germany. It was rated at 62nhp.

== History ==
Spica was built as yard number 244 by Schiffbau-Gesellschaft Unterweser AG, Wesermünde, Germany. She was launched on 5 November 1930 and completed on 2 December. She was built for the Hochseefischerei Nordstern AG, Wesermünde. The Code Letters KRGN were allocated, as was the fishing boat registration PG 404. In 1934, her Code Letters were changed to DFBS.

On 17 September 1939, Spica was requisitioned by the Kriegsmarine for use as a vorpostenboot. She was allocated to 2 Vorpostenflotille as V 214 Spica. She was reallocated on 21 October to 8 Vorpostenflotille as V 804 Spica.

Post-war she returned to merchant service with her pre-war owners. The fishing boat registration BX 383 was allocated in 1948. She was scrapped in April 1955 by W. Ritscher, Hamburg, West Germany.

== Sources ==
- Gröner, Erich (1993). Die deutschen Kriegsschiffe 1815-1945 (in German). Vol. 8/I: Flußfahrzeuge, Ujäger, Vorpostenboote, Hilfsminensucher, Küstenschutzverbände (Teil 1). Koblenz: Bernard & Graefe. ISBN 3-7637-4807-5.
