= German trawler V 602 Richard C. Krogmann =

German fishing trawler

History
- Name: Richard C. Krogmann
- Namesake: Richard Carl Krogmann
- Owner: Cuxhavener Hochseefischerei AG (1928–29); Nordsee Hochseefischerei (1929–39); Kriegsmarine (1939–43)
- Port of registry: (Weimar Republic) Cuxhaven, Germany (1928–33); (Nazi Germany) (1933–39); Kriegsmarine (1939–43)
- Builder: Schiffbau-Gesellschaft Unterweser, Wesermünde-Lehe
- Yard number: 226
- Launched: 14 June 1928
- Completed: 1 August 1928
- Commissioned: 5 September 1939
- Identification: Fishing boat registration HC 206 (1928–39); Code Letters RGVN (1928–34); Code Letters DHUB (1934–43); Pennant Number M 1902 (1939–40); Pennant Number V 704 (1940–43); Pennant Number V 602 (1943)
- Fate: Sank 1943

General characteristics
- Tonnage: 290 GRT, 110 NRT
- Length: 42.70 m (140 ft 1 in)
- Beam: 7.42 metres (24 ft 4 in)
- Depth: 3.40 m (11 ft 2 in)
- Installed power: Compound steam engine, 59nhp
- Propulsion: Single screw propeller
- Speed: 11 knots (20 km/h)

Richard C. Krogmann was a German fishing trawler which was built in 1928. She was requisitioned by the Kriegsmarine during the Second World War. She was used as a minesweeper and a Vorpostenboot. She struck a mine and sank at the mouth of the Charente in 1943.

== Description ==
The ship 42.70 m (140 ft 1 in) long, with a beam of 7.42 metres (24 ft 4 in). She had a depth of 3.40 m (11 ft 2 in). She was assessed at 290 GRT, 110 NRT. She was powered by a four-cylinder compound steam engine, which had two cylinders of 30 centimetres (12 in) diameter and two cylinders of 66 centimetres (26 in) diameter by 66 centimetres (26 in) stroke. The engine was built by Christiansen & Meyer, Harburg, Germany. It was rated at 59 nhp. It drove a single screw propeller. It could propel the ship at 11 knots (20 km/h).

== History ==
Richard C. Krogmann was built as yard number 226 by Schiffbau-Gesellschaft Unterweser, Wesermünde-Lehe, Germany. She was launched on 14 June 1928 and completed on 1 August. Owned by the Cuxhavener Hochseefischerei AG, her port of registry was Cuxhaven. She was allocated the Code Letters RGVN, and the fishing boat registration HC 206. On 8 March 1929, she was sold to the Nordsee Hochseefischerei. In 1934, her Code Letters were changed to DHUB.

On 5 September 1939, Richard C. Krogmann was requisitioned by the Kriegsmarine. Designated as a minesweeper, she was allocated the pennant number M 1902. On 1 June 1940, she was redesignated as a vorpostenboot. She was allocated to 7 Vorpostenflotille as V 704 Richard C. Krogmann. On 1 July 1943, she was reallocated to 6 Vorpostenflotille as V 602 Richard C. Krogmann. On 11 December 1943, she struck a mine at the mouth of the Charente (45°59′36″N 1°09′45″W) and sank.
