= German trawler V 407 Dorum =

German fishing trawler

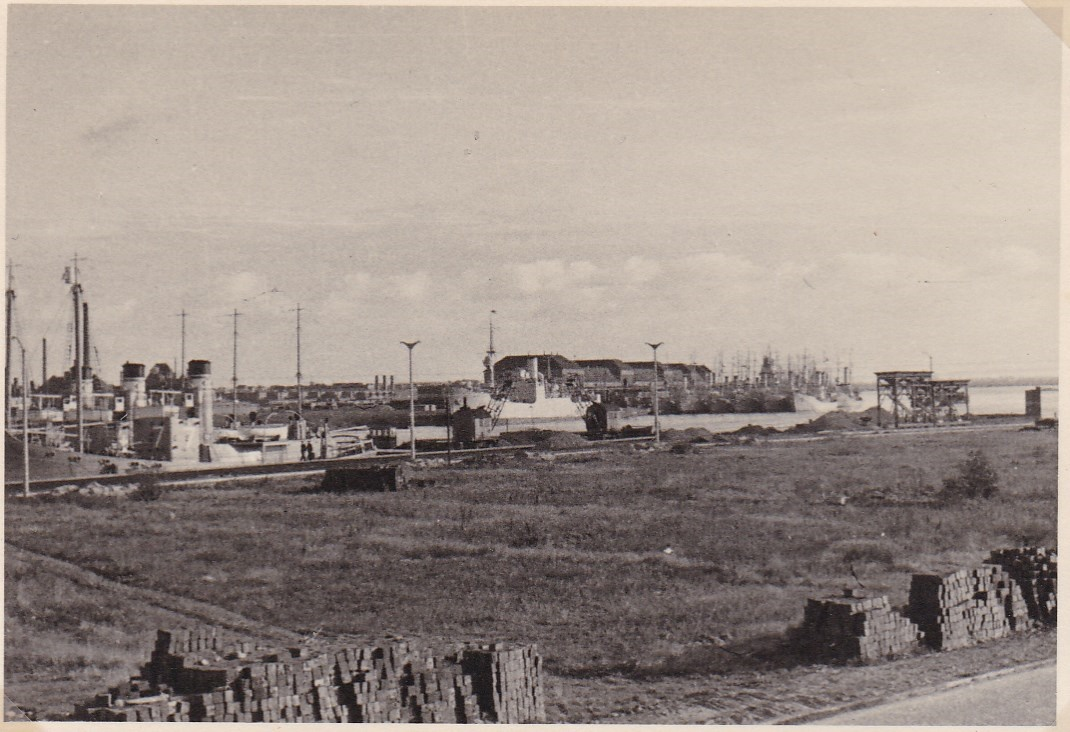
- Vorpostenboote of 4 Vorpostenflotille at Bremerhaven in 1940. V 407 Dorum closest to the quayside.

History
- Name: Dorum (1937–44); General Aupick (1949–57)
- Owner: Ernst Glässel (1937–39); Kriegsmarine (1939–44)
- Port of registry: (Nazi Germany) Wesermünde, Germany (1937–39); Kriegsmarine (1939–44); France (1949–57)
- Builder: Deschimag
- Yard number: 592
- Launched: September 1937
- Completed: 10 October 1937
- Commissioned: 10 September 1939
- Out of service: 28 August 1944
- Identification: Code Letters DFCX; Fishing boat registration PG519 (1937– ); Fishing boat registration BB92 ( –1939); Pennant Number V 204 (1939); Pennant Number V 407 (1939–44)
- Fate: Scuttled 28 August 1944

General characteristics
- Type: Fishing trawler (1937–39, 1949–57); Vorpostenboot (1939–44)
- Tonnage: 470 GRT, 171 NRT
- Length: 50.80 m (166 ft 8 in)
- Beam: 8.03 m (26 ft 4 in)
- Depth: 3.20 m (10 ft 6 in)
- Installed power: Triple expansion steam engine, 96nhp
- Propulsion: Single screw propeller

Dorum was a German fishing trawler that was requisitioned by the Kriegsmarine in the Second World War for use as a Vorpostenboot, serving as V 204 Dorum and V 407 Dorum. She was scuttled at, or near, Bordeaux, Gironde, France on 28 August 1944.

== Description ==
Dorum was 50.80 metres (166 ft 8 in) long, with a beam of 8.03 metres (26 ft 4 in) and a depth of 3.20 metres (10 ft 6 in). She was assessed at 470 GRT, 171 NRT. She was powered by a triple expansion steam engine, which had cylinders of 35 centimetres (13 3/4 in), 55 centimetres (21 5/8 in) and 90.0 centimetres (35 7/16 in) diameter by 64.9 centimetres (25 9/16 in) stroke. The engine was built by Deschimag, Wesermünde. It was rated at 96nhp and drove a single screw propeller via a low pressure turbine, double reduction gearing and a hydraulic coupling.

== History ==
Dorum was built as yard number 592 by Deschimag, Wesermünde. She was launched in September 1937 and completed on 10 October. The ship was built for Ernst Glässel, Wesermünde. The Code Letters DFCX were allocated. She initially carried the fishing boat registration PG519, which was later changed to BB92. On 10 September 1939, the vessel was requisitioned by the Kriegsmarine. She was allocated to 2 Vorpostenflotille as V 204 Dorum. On 21 October, she was transferred to 4 Vorpostenflotille as V 407 Dorum. On 28 August 1944, Dorum was scuttled, either in the Gironde, or at Bordeaux, Gironde, France.

Post-war, Dorum was raised and repaired. In 1949, she was renamed General Aupick under French ownership. On 12 April 1957, she sprang a leak and sank in the Doggerbank (56°42′N 3°42′E).
