= German trawler V 607 Düsseldorf =

Boat

History
- Name: Mark Brandenburg (1921–30); Fischereidirektor Lübbert (1930–35); Düsseldorf (1935–48); Turbot (1948–49); Poland (1949–53)
- Owner: Hochseefischerei Groß Berlin (1921); Emder (1921–26); Deutsche Seefischerei (1926–27); Cuxhavener Hochseefischerei (1927–29); Nordsee Deutsche Hochseefischerei Bremen-Cuxhaven (1929–41); Kriegsmarine (1941–44); Unknown (1948–53)
- Port of registry: (Weimar Republic) Wesermünde, Germany (1921); (Weimar Republic) Emden, Germany (1921–26); (Weimar Republic) Cuxhaven, Germany (1926–33); (Nazi Germany) Cuxhaven, Germany (1933–41); Kriegsmarine (1931–44); France (1948–53)
- Builder: J. C. Tecklenborg, Geestemünde
- Yard number: 365
- Launched: 6 April 1921
- Completed: 30 August 1921
- Commissioned: 8 August 1940
- Out of service: 1944–48; January 1953
- Identification: Fishing boat registration PG 313 (1921); Code Letters KRFB (1921–34); Fishing boat registration AE 122 (1921–26); Fishing boat registration HC 177 (1926–37); Fishing boat registration PC 177 (1937–41); Code Letters DHHX (1934–44); Schiff 13 (1940–41); Pennant Number V 710 (1941–44); Pennant Number V 607 (1944)
- Fate: Scrapped

General characteristics
- Type: Fishing trawler (1921–41, 1948-53); Vorpostenboot (1939–44)
- Tonnage: 259 GRT, 96 NRT
- Length: 39.80 m (130 ft 7 in)
- Beam: 7.16 metres (23 ft 6 in)
- Depth: 2.92 m (9 ft 7 in)
- Installed power: Triple expansion steam engine, 50nhp
- Propulsion: Single screw propeller
- Speed: 10 knots (19 km/h)
- Armament: 1 x 88mm cannon, various 20mm guns

Düsseldorf was a German fishing trawler which was built in 1921 as Mark Brandenburg. She was renamed Fischereidirektor Lübbert in 1930 and Düsseldorf in 1935. She was requisitioned by the Kriegsmarine during the Second World War. She was used as a Vorpostenboot. She was sunk in French waters in 1944. Raised and repaired post-war, she was renamed Turbot in 1948 and Poland in 1949. She was scrapped in January 1953.

== Description ==
The ship 39.80 m (130 ft 7 in) long, with a beam of 7.01 metres (23 ft 0 in). She had a depth of 2.92 m (9 ft 7 in). She was assessed at 259 GRT, 99 NRT. She was powered by a triple expansion steam engine, which had cylinders of 32 centimetres (12 5/8 in), 52 centimetres (20 1/2 in) and 82 centimetres (32 1/4 in) diameter by 57 centimetres (22 5/8 in) stroke. The engine was built by J. C. Tecklenborg, Geestemünde, Germany. It was rated at 50 nhp. It drove a single screw propeller. It could propel the ship at 10 knots (19 km/h).

== History ==
Mark Brandenburg was built as yard number 365 by J. C. Tecklenborg, Geestemünde, Germany. She was launched on 6 April 1921 and completed on 24 August. Owned by the Hochseefischerei Groß, her port of registry was Wesermünde. She was allocated the fishing boat registration PG 313, and the Code Letters KRFB. On 26 November 1921, she was sold to the Emder Hochseefischerei. Her fishing boat registration was changed to AE 122. On 17 June 1926, she was sold to the Deutsche Seefischerei. Her fishing boat registration was changed to HC 177. On 21 March 1927, she was sold to the Cuxhavener Hochseefischerei. On 8 March 1929, she was sold to the Nordsee Hochseefischerei. On 24 January 1930, Mark Brandenburg was renamed Fischereidirektor Lübbert. In 1934, her Code Letters were changed to DHHX. On 4 November 1935, Fischereidirektor Lübbert was renamed Düsseldorf. On 12 April 1937, her fishing boat registration was changed to PC 177.

On 8 August 1940, Düsseldorf was requisitioned by the Kriegsmarine and designated as Schiff 13. She scheduled to take part in Unternehmen Seelöwe. On 23 August, she struck a mine and was beached at Dieppe, Seine-Inférieure, France. She was subsequently repaired. On 9 July 1941, she was designated as a vorpostenboot. She was allocated to 7 Vorpostenflotille as V 710 Düsseldorf. On 9 April 1944, she was reallocated to 6 Vorpostenflotille as V 607 Düsseldorf. Later in 1944, she was sunk in French waters.

Dusseldorf was later refloated and repaired. In 1948, she became the French fishing boat Turbot. She was renamed Poland in 1949, serving until scrapped in January 1953.
