= German trawler V 306 Fritz Hincke =

German fishing trawler used as a vorpostenboot during WW2

History
- Name: Georg Adolf Kühling (1929–30); Fritz Hincke (1930–41)
- Owner: Hochseefischerei J. Wieting AG (1929–34); Deutsche Nordsee Hochseefischerei (1934–39); Kriegsmarine (1939–41)
- Operator: Nordsee Deutsche Hochseefischerei Bremen-Cuxhaven AG (1929–39); Kriegsmarine (1939–41)
- Port of registry: (Weimar Republic) Wesermünde, Germany (1929–33); (Nazi Germany) Wesermünde, Germany (1933–39); Kriegsmarine (1939–41)
- Builder: Deschimag
- Yard number: 479
- Launched: August 1929
- Completed: 7 September 1929
- Out of service: 5 January 1941
- Identification: Code Letters QVNG (1929–34); Fishing boat registration BX 206 (1929–30); Fishing boat registration ON 139 (1930–34); Code Letters DNOO (1934–41); Fishing boat registration PG 474 (1934–39); Pennant Number V 306 (1939–41)
- Fate: Struck a mine and sank

General characteristics
- Class & type: Fishing trawler (1929–39); Vorpostenboot (1939–41)
- Tonnage: 392 GRT, 149 NRT
- Length: 45.31 m (148 ft 8 in)
- Beam: 7.69 m (25 ft 3 in)
- Draught: 4.40 m (14 ft 5 in)
- Depth: 3.56 m (11 ft 8 in)
- Installed power: Triple expansion steam engine, 65nhp
- Propulsion: Single screw propeller
- Speed: 10 knots (19 km/h)

V 306 Fritz Hincke was a German fishing trawler that was requisitioned in the Second World War for use as a vorpostenboot. She was built in 1929 as Georg Adolf Kühling and was renamed in 1930. She struck a mine and sank in January 1941.

== Description ==
The ship was 45.31 metres (148 ft 8 in) long, with a beam of 7.69 metres (25 ft 3 in). She had a depth of 3.56 metres (11 ft 8 in) and a draught of 4.40 metres (14 ft 5 in). She was assessed at 381 GRT, 147 NRT. She was powered by a triple expansion steam engine, which had cylinders of 35 centimetres (13 3/4 in), 55 centimetres (21 5/8 in) and 90 centimetres (35 1/2 in) diameter by 60 centimetres (23 5/8 in) stroke. The engine was made by Deschimag Seebeckwerft, Wesermünde. It was rated at 65nhp. The engine powered a single screw propeller driven via a geared low pressure turbine. It could propel the ship at 10 knots (19 km/h).

== History ==
Georg Adolf Kühling was built as yard number 479 by Deschimag Seebeckwerfte, Wesermünde for the Hochseefischerei J. Wieting AG., Wesermünde. She was launched in August 1929 and completed on 7 September. Operated under the management of the Nordsee Deutsche Hochseefischerei Bremen-Cuxhaven AG, the Code Letters QVNG were allocated, as was the fishing boat registration BX 206. On 16 June 1930, her registration was changed to ON 139. On 24 October she was renamed Fritz Hincke. In 1934, her Code Letters were changed to DNOO. On 4 September 1934, her registration was changed to PG 474. She was sold to her managers on 10 November.

On 23 September 1939, Fritz Hincke was requisitioned by the Kriegsmarine for use as a Vorpostenboot. She was allocated to 3 Vorpostenflotille as V 306 Fritz Hincke. On 5 January 1941 she struck a mine and sank in the North Sea 8 nautical miles (15 km) south west of IJmuiden, North Holland, Netherlands (52°35′N 4°34′E) with the loss of 22 lives.

== Sources ==
- Gröner, Erich (1993). Die deutschen Kriegsschiffe 1815-1945 (in German). Vol. 8/I: Flußfahrzeuge, Ujäger, Vorpostenboote, Hilfsminensucher, Küstenschutzverbände (Teil 1). Koblenz: Bernard & Graefe. ISBN 3-7637-4807-5.
