= German trawler V 402 Dr. Adolf Spilker =

Fishing trawler used by the Kriegsmarine

History
- Name: Dr. Adolf Spilker
- Owner: F. Busse (1936–39); Kriegsmarine (1939–44)
- Port of registry: (Nazi Germany) Wesermünde, Germany (1936–39); Kriegsmarine (1939–44)
- Builder: Schiffbau-Gesellschaft Unterweser AG
- Yard number: 261
- Launched: 22 August 1936
- Completed: 22 September 1936
- Commissioned: 16 September 1939
- Out of service: 21 August 1944
- Identification: Code Letters DFCN; Fishing boat registration PG 506 (1936–39); Pennant Number V 401 (1939); Pennant Number V 402 (1939–44)
- Fate: Scuttled

General characteristics
- Tonnage: 428 GRT, 159 NRT
- Length: 54.56 m (179 ft 0 in)
- Beam: 8.10 m (26 ft 7 in)
- Draught: 3.77 m (12 ft 4 in)
- Depth: 4.35 m (14 ft 3 in)
- Installed power: Compound steam engine, 70nhp
- Propulsion: Single screw propeller

Dr. Adolf Spilker was a German fishing trawler that was requisitioned by the Kriegsmarine in the Second World War for use as a Vorpostenboot, serving as V 401 Dr. Adolf Spilker and V 402 Dr. Adolf Spilker. She was scuttled at Bayonne, France in August 1944.

== Description ==
Dr. Adolf Spilker was 54.56 metres (179 ft 0 in) long, with a beam of 8.10 metres (26 ft 7 in). She had a depth of 4.35 metres (14 ft 3 in) and a draught of 3.77 metres (12 ft 4 in). She was assessed at 435 GRT, 168 NRT. The ship was powered by a compound steam engine which had two cylinders each of 33 centimetres (13 in) and two cylinders each of 72 centimetres (28 3/8 in) diameter by 70 centimetres (27 9/16 in) stroke. The engine was built by Christiansen & Meyer, Harburg, Germany and was rated at 70nhp. It drove a single screw propeller.

== History ==
Dr. Adolf Spilker was built as yard number 261 by Schiffbau-Gesellschaft Unterweser AG, Wesermünde, Germany. She was launched on 22 August 1936 and completed on 22 September. She was built for F. Busse, Wesermünde. The Code Letters DFCN were allocated, as was the fishing boat registration PG 502.

On 16 September 1939, she was requisitioned by the Kriegsmarine and commissioned with 4 Vorpostenflotille as the Vorpostenboot V 401 Dr. Adolf Spilker. On 16 October 1944, she was redesignated V 402 Dr. Adolf Spilker. She was scuttled as a blockship at Bayonne, Basses-Pyrénées, France on 20 August 1944.

== Sources ==
- Gröner, Erich (1993). Die deutschen Kriegsschiffe 1815-1945 (in German). Vol. 8/I: Flußfahrzeuge, Ujäger, Vorpostenboote, Hilfsminensucher, Küstenschutzverbände (Teil 1). Koblenz: Bernard & Graefe. ISBN 3-7637-4807-5.
