= German trawler V 422 Kergroise =

1918 German naval vessel

History
- Name: Bunnemann (1918–21); Kergroise (1921–44)
- Owner: Kaiserliche Marine (1918–20); French Navy (1920–21); Société des Pêcheries de St. Pierre et Miquelon (1921–31); Compagnie Laurentaise de Chalutage (1931-39); French Navy (1939–42); Kriegsmarine (1942–44)
- Port of registry: Kaiserliche Marine (1918–20); French Navy (1920–21); (France) Saint Pierre et Miquelon (1921–31); Lorient, France (1931–39); French Navy (1939–40); Kriegsmarine (1942–44)
- Builder: Eiderwerft AG
- Yard number: 108
- Launched: July 1918
- Commissioned: 6 September 1918 (Kaiserliche Marine); 3 July 1920 (French Navy); 23 September 1939 (French Navy); 13 October 1942 (Kriegsmarine)
- Out of service: 1940–42
- Identification: Code Letters OKSX (1921–34); Fishing boat registration L 2109 (1931–39); Code Letters FNVH (1934–39); Pennant Number AD 134 (1939–42); Pennant Number V 422 (1942–44)
- Fate: Sunk 30 June 1944

General characteristics
- Class & type: Auxiliary patrol vessel (1918–21); Fishing trawler (1921–39); Minesweeper (1939-40); Vorpostenboot (1942–44)
- Tonnage: 259 GRT, 111 NRT
- Length: 38.24 m (125 ft 6 in)
- Beam: 7.06 m (23 ft 2 in)
- Draught: 3.60 m (11 ft 10 in)
- Depth: 4.15 m (13 ft 7 in)
- Installed power: Triple expansion steam engine, 52nhp
- Propulsion: Single screw propeller
- Speed: 10 knots (19 km/h)

Kergroise was built in 1918 as the German patrol vessel SMS Bunnemann. Allocated to the French Navy in 1920, she was sold in 1921, becoming the fishing trawler Kergroise. She was requisition by the French Navy in 1939 for use as a minesweeper. She was sunk in June 1940. Subsequently refloated in April 1941 and repaired. In October 1942 was requisitioned by the Kriegsmarine for use as a vorpostenboot, serving as V 422 Kergroise. She was sunk in June 1944.

== Description ==
The ship was 38.24 metres (125 ft 6 in) long, with a beam of 7.06 metres (23 ft 2 in). She had a depth of 4.15 metres (13 ft 7 in), and a draught of 3.06 metres (10 ft 0 in). She was assessed at 261 GRT, 84 NRT. She was powered by a triple expansion steam engine, which had cylinders of 33 centimetres (13 in), 51 centimetres (20 1/4 in) and 84 centimetres (33 in) diameter by 60 centimetres (23 3/4 in) stroke. The engine was made by Görlitzer Maschinenbau AG, Görlitz. It was rated at 52nhp. The engine powered a single screw propeller. It could propel the ship at 9 knots (17 km/h).

== History ==
Bunnemann was built as yard number 108 by Schiffsbau & Maschinenfabrik Hansa, Tönning for the Kaiserliche Marine. She was launched in July 1918 and was commissioned on 6 September 1918. She was allocated to II Geleit-Flotille. On 3 July 1920, she was declared a prize of war and allocated to the French Navy.

In 1921, Bunnemann was sold. She was renamed Kergroise and converted to a fishing trawler. She was owned by the Société des Pêcheries de St. Pierre et Miquelon. The Code Letters OKSX were allocated. In 1931, she was sold to the Compagnie Laurentaise de Chalutage, Lorient, Morbihan, France. The fishing boat registration L 2109 was allocated, In 1934, her Code Letters were changed to FNVH.

On 23 September 1939, Kergroise was requisitioned by the French Navy for use as a minesweeper. The pennant number AD 134 was allocated. She was scuttled at Loirent on 18 June 1940. Kergroise was refloated on 4 April 1941 and subsequently repaired. She was commissioned by the Kriegsmarine on 13 October 1942 as the vorpostenboot V 422 Kergroise. She was bombed and sunk off Lorient by Allied aircraft on 30 June 1944.

== Sources ==
- Gröner, Erich (1993). Die deutschen Kriegsschiffe 1815-1945 (in German). Vol. 8/I: Flußfahrzeuge, Ujäger, Vorpostenboote, Hilfsminensucher, Küstenschutzverbände (Teil 1). Koblenz: Bernard & Graefe. ISBN 3-7637-4807-5.
