= SS Wandrahm =

History
- Name: Wandrahm (1927–40); Eismeer (1940–45); Onega (Онега) (1945–64)
- Owner: H. M. Gehrckens (1927–39); Kriegsmarine (1939–45); Soviet government (1945–69)
- Port of registry: (Weimar Republic) Hamburg, Germany (1927–33); (Nazi Germany) Hamburg, Germany (1933–39); Kriegsmarine (1939–45); Murmansk, Soviet Union (1945–64)
- Builder: Stettiner Oderwerke
- Yard number: 735
- Launched: 29 November 1927
- Commissioned: 30 September 1939
- Identification: Code Letters RGLV (1927–34); Code Letters DHZK (1934–45); Kriegsmarine designation Schiff 4 (1939–40); Pennant number V 1801 (1940); Pennant number V 6114 (1940–45)

General characteristics
- Type: Cargo ship (1927–39); Auxiliary naval vessel (1939–45); Factory ship (1945–64)
- Tonnage: 1,228 GRT, 683 NRT (as built); 1,662 GRT, 683 NRT (after conversion)
- Length: 72.97 metres (239 ft 5 in)
- Beam: 11.48 metres (37 ft 8 in)
- Depth: 4.37 metres (14 ft 4 in)
- Installed power: Triple expansion steam engine, 120nhp
- Propulsion: Single screw propeller
- Speed: 8 to 10 knots (15 to 19 km/h)

Wandrahm was German a cargo ship built in 1927. She was requisitioned by the Kriegsmarine during the Second World War, serving as Schiff 4, V 1801 Wandrahm and V 6114 Eismeer. Post-war, she was allocated to the Soviet Union. Renamed Onega, she was used as a factory ship. She was on the shipping registers until 1969.

== Description ==
As built, the ship was 72.97 metres (239 ft 5 in) long, with a beam of 11.48 metres (37 ft 8 in) and a depth of 4.37 metres (14 ft 4 in). She was powered by a triple expansion steam engine which had cylinders of 44.9 centimetres (17 11/16 in), 71.9 centimetres (28 5/16 in) and 116.0 centimetres (45 11/16 in) diameter by 84.9 centimetres (33 7/16 in) stroke. The engine was built by Stettiner Oderwerke, Stettin, Germany. Rated at 120nhp, it drove a single screw propeller, and could propel the ship at 8 to 10 knots (15 to 19 km/h).

== History ==
Wandrahm was built in 1927 as yard number 735 by Stettiner Oderwerke for H. M. Gehrckens, Hamburg, Germany. She was launched on 29 November 1927. The Code Letters RGLV were allocated. In 1934, her Code Letters were changed to DHZK.

On 30 September 1939, Wandrahm was requisitioned by the Kriegsmarine. She was designated "Schiff 4" and allocated to 5 Vorpostengruppe. The vorpostengruppe was disbanded on 22 May 1940 and she was reallocated to 18 Vorpostenflotille, serving as V 1801 Wandrahm. On 31 August 1940, she was reallocated to 61 Vorpostenflotille, serving as V 6114 Eismeer.

Eismeer was allocated to the Soviet Union post-war as part of the war reparations. She was renamed Onega (Онега). She was used as a factory ship based in Murmansk. She collected fish from trawlers and processed it before delivery to port. It was found that her hold capacity was too small compared to Liberty ships also used in that role. Therefore, Onega was rebuilt to increase her hold capacity. Following the rebuild, she was assessed at 1,668 GRT, 683 NRT. Withdrawn from service in 1964, she was mentioned in an accident report in 1965, and was still on the shipping registers in 1969.
