= German trawler V 216 Goëland =

History
- Name: Goëland
- Owner: F. Courtois & F. Hovelaque (1906–20); Victor Fourny (1920–22); Sociètè Française des Pêcheries à Vapeur (1922– ); Compagnie Générale de Grande Pêche( –1940); French Navy (1940); Kriegsmarine (1940–44)
- Operator: Auguste Bourgain-Bourgain (1906–20); Victor Fourny (1920–22); Veuve Christiaens & A. Bourgain (1922– ); ( –1940)
- Port of registry: Boulogne, France (1906– ); Fécamp, France( –1940); French Navy (1940); Kriegsmarine (1941–45)
- Builder: Bonn & Mees
- Yard number: 109
- Launched: 1906
- Commissioned: 1940 (French Navy); November 1940 (Kriegsmarine)
- Decommissioned: November 1940 (French Navy)
- Out of service: 6 August 1944
- Identification: Code Letters JLBS (1918–22); Code Letters OIHT (1922-34); Code Letters FOGY (1934–40); Pennant Humber HS 06 (1940–42); Pennant Number V 727 (1942–44); Pennant Number V 216 (1944)
- Fate: Sunk

General characteristics
- Type: Fishing trawler (1906–40); Watchboat (1940); Vorpostenboot (1942–44)
- Tonnage: 268 GRT, 129 NRT
- Length: 42.81 m (140 ft 5 in)
- Beam: 6.61 m (21 ft 8 in)
- Draught: 3.81 m (12 ft 6 in)
- Installed power: Triple expansion steam engine, 96nhp
- Propulsion: Single screw propeller
- Speed: 10 knots (19 km/h)

Goëland was a French fishing trawler that was built in 1906. She was requisitioned in the Second World War by the French Navy for use as a watchboat. She was captured by the Kriegsmarine, serving as HS 06 Goëland, and later as the Vorpostenboot V 727 Goëland and later as V 216 Goëland. She was sunk in 1944.

== Description ==
The ship 42.81 metres (140 ft 5 in) long, with a beam of 6.61 metres (21 ft 8 in). She had a draught of 3.81 metres (12 ft 6 in). She was assessed at 268 GRT, 129 NRT. She was powered by a triple expansion steam engine, which had cylinders of 33 centimetres (13 in), 53 centimetres (21 in) and 89 centimetres (35 in) diameter by 100 inches (254 cm) stroke. The engine was built by Alblasserdam Maschien Fabriek, Alblasserdam, South Holland, Netherlands. It was rated at 60nhp. It drove a single screw propeller. It could propel the ship at 10 knots (19 km/h).

== History ==
Goëland was built as yard number 180 by Bonn & Mees, Rotterdam, South Holland for F. Courtois & F. Havelaque, Boulogne, Pas-de-Calais, France. She was operated under the management of Auguste Bourgain-Bourgain. By 1918, the Code Letters JLBS had been allocated. By 1920, she had been sold to Victor Fourny, Boulogne. By 1922, she had been sold to the Sociètè Française des Pêcheries à Vapeur, Boulogne. She was operated under the management of Veuve Christiaens & A. Bourgain. Her Code Letters were now OIHT.

Goëland was later sold to the Compagnie Générale Grande Pêche, Fécamp, Seine-Inférieure, France. From 1934, her code letters were FOGY. In 1940, she was requisitioned by the French Navy for uses as a watchboat. She was captured later that year by the Kriegsmarine, and was commissioned on 30 November 1940 as HS 06 Goëland. On 2 May 1942 she was allocated to 7 Vorpostenflotille as the vorpostenboot V 727 Goëland. In 1944, she was reallocated to 2 Vorpostenflotille as V 216 Goëland. She was sunk on 6 August 1944 at Saint-Malo, Ille-et-Vilaine, France.

== Sources ==
- Gröner, Erich (1993). Die deutschen Kriegsschiffe 1815-1945 (in German). Vol. 8/I: Flußfahrzeuge, Ujäger, Vorpostenboote, Hilfsminensucher, Küstenschutzverbände (Teil 1). Koblenz: Bernard & Graefe. ISBN 3-7637-4807-5.
