= German trawler V 801 Max Gundelach =

German Vorpostenboot

History

Nazi Germany
- Name: Max Gundelach
- Yard number: 641
- Launched: 16 March 1940
- In service: 30 August 1940
- Fate: Sunk 25 July 1943 by a torpedo from either a British aircraft or motor torpedo boat

General characteristics
- Type: Converted trawler
- Tonnage: 511 GRT
- Length: 51.7 m (169 ft 7 in)
- Beam: 8.3 m (27 ft)
- Propulsion: steam
- Speed: 12 knots (22 km/h; 14 mph)

V 801 Max Gundelach, originally designated PG-555, was a German fishing trawler which was converted into a Vorpostenboot patrol boat and placed in the 8th Picket Boat Flotilla during World War II.

== Service ==
The ship was originally designed as a fishing boat, launching on 16 July 1940 with the designation PG-555. It was built in Bremerhaven by Schichau Seebeckwerft and was originally owned by Grundmann & Gröschel.

On 30 August 1940 the ship was requisitioned by the Kriegsmarine, listed as VP 801, and placed as a Vorpostenboot in the 8th Picket Boat Flotilla. On 24 July 1943, the ship was a part of a convoy escorting the ships Möwe, Nordia, and Vasaborg from the Elbe River towards Rotterdam. It was one of five picket boats in the convoy, which also consisted of the submarine hunter UJ 1409 and eight minesweepers. Although Max Gundelach was serving as the convoy's doctor ship, it was still armed with small caliber weapons and depth charges.

On 25 July 1943, while underway with the convoy, the Max Gundelach was sunk by a torpedo west of Terschelling in an engagement with either British aircraft or Motor torpedo boats. The fight was not long, but the picket boat did expend part of its larger caliber ammunition. Eleven of its crew were killed.
