= SS Nerissa (1936) =

History
- Name: Nerissa
- Owner: A. Kirsten (1936–39); Kriegsmarine (1939-44)
- Port of registry: (Nazi Germany) Hamburg, Germany (1936–39); Kriegsmarine (1939–44)
- Builder: Lübecker Maschinenbau Gesellschaft
- Launched: 6 June 1936
- Completed: 30 July 1936
- Commissioned: 7 September 1939
- Out of service: 28 June 1944
- Identification: Code Letters DJRQ; Schiff 20 (1939–44)
- Fate: Torpedoed and sunk

General characteristics
- Class & type: Cargo ship (1936–39); Vorpostenboot (1939–44)
- Tonnage: 992 GRT, 454 NRT
- Length: 70.84 metres (232 ft 5 in)
- Beam: 10.13 metres (33 ft 3 in)
- Depth: 3.56 metres (11 ft 8 in)
- Installed power: Compound steam engine, 160 nhp
- Propulsion: Screw propeller
- Speed: 10.5 knots (19.4 km/h)

Nerissa was a cargo ship that was built in 1936 by Lübecker Maschinenbau Gesellschaft, Lübeck, Germany for A. Kirsten, Hamburg. She was requisitioned by the Kriegsmarine during World War II and was designated Schiff 20. She was torpedoed and sunk in 1944.

== Description ==
Nerissa was 70.84 metres (232 ft 5 in) long, with a beam of 10.13 metres (33 ft 3 in). She had a depth of 3.56 metres (11 ft 8 in).

She was powered by a 4-cylinder compound steam engine, which had 2 cylinders of 33 cm (13 in) diameter and two cylinders of 760 mm (29 15/16 in) diameter by 80 cm (31 1/2 in) stroke. The engine was built by Christiansen & Meyer, Harburg. It was rated at 160 nhp and drove a screw propeller. She had a speed of 10.5 knots (19.4 km/h).

== History ==
Nerissa was built in 1936 by Lübecker Maschinenbau Gesellschaft, Lübeck for A. Kirsten, Hamburg. She was launched on 6 June 1936 and completed on 30 July. Her port of registry was Hamburg and the Code Letters DJRQ were allocated.

On 7 September 1939, Nerissa was requisitioned by the Kriegsmarine. She was designated as Schiff 20. On 23 December, she was allocated to 5 Vorpostengruppe for use as a vorpostenboot. On 22 January 1940, Nerissa was placed under the control of the Führer der Sonderverband West. On 30 May 1940, she was allocated to the Erpobungsverand Luftwaffe.

Nerissa was decommissioned on 4 June 1940, but was recommissioned on 19 December. On 19 November 1943, she was damaged by a Soviet Navy torpedo boat whilst on a voyage from Kirkenes, Norway to Petsamo, Finland. She was repaired and returned to service. Nerissa was torpedoed and sunk in the Baltic Sea off Cap Romanov by the Soviet Navy torpedo boat TKA-239 with the loss of six of her crew.
