= MV Neuss =

History
- Name: Neuss
- Owner: Schiffarts-und-Assekuranz G.m.b.H (1935–39); Kriegsmarine (1939-40)
- Operator: Ernst Russ (1935–39); Kriegsmarine (1939-45)
- Port of registry: (Nazi Germany) Hamburg, Germany (1935–39); Kriegsmarine (1939–45); Hamburg, Allied-occupied Germany (1945–47)
- Builder: Howaldtswerke
- Launched: 22 October 1935
- Identification: Code Letters DJQJ; Schiff 15 (1939–45)

General characteristics
- Class & type: Cargo ship (1935–39, 1945–47); Vorpostenboot (1939–40); Torpedo boat (1940)
- Tonnage: 1,243 GRT, 673 NRT
- Length: 73.48 metres (241 ft 1 in)
- Beam: 10.82 metres (35 ft 6 in)
- Depth: 4.32 metres (14 ft 2 in)
- Installed power: Diesel engine, 289nhp
- Propulsion: Twin screw propellers

Neuss was a cargo ship that was built in 1935 by Howaldtswerke AG, Hamburg for Schiffarts-und-Assekuranz G.m.b.H., Hamburg. She was requisitioned by the Kriegsmarine during World War II and was designated Schiff 15. She survived the war and was returned to her owners.

== Description ==
Neuss was 73.48 metres (241 ft 1 in) long, with a beam of 10.82 metres (35 ft 6 in). She had a depth of 4.32 metres (14 ft 2 in).

She was powered by two 2-stroke diesel engines, both of which had 12 cylinders of 303 mm (11 15/16 in) diameter by 421 mm (16 9/16 in) stroke. The engines were built by Maschinenfabriek Augsburg-Nürnburg AG., Augsburg. They rated at 289 nhp and drove twin screw propellers.

== History ==
Neuss was builti 1935 by Howaldtswerke AG, Hamburg for Schiffarts-und-Assekuranz G.m.b.H. She was launched on 22 October 1935 and completed on 6 June 1936. Her port of registry was Hamburg and the Code Letters DJQJ were allocated.

On 30 September 1939, Neuss was requisitioned by the Kriegsmarine. She was designated as Schiff 15 and allocated to Sondergruppe 1. On 23 December, she was allocated to 5 Vorpostengruppe for use as a vorpostenboot. On 22 January 1940, Neuss was placed under the control of the Führer der Sonderverband West. On 25 April 1940, she was redesignated as a torpedo boat.

Neuss survived the war. Lloyd's Register indicates that she may have been renamed Zutphen post-war, but by 1947 she was back in the ownership of Schiffarts-und-Assekuranz G.m.b.H. and carrying the name Neuss.
