= German trawler V 105 Cremon =

German Vorpostenboote

History
- Name: Cremon
- Owner: Deutsche Hochsee-fischerei Bremen-Cuxhaven (1922–39); Kriegsmarine (1939–40)
- Port of registry: (Weimar Republic) Cuxhaven, Germany (1922–35); (Nazi Germany) Cuxhaven, Germany (1935–39); Kriegsmarine (1939–40)
- Builder: Reiherstieg Schiffswerfte & Maschinenfabrik A. G., Hamburg
- Launched: 1922
- Identification: Code Letters RDGJ (1922–34); Code Letters DHEM (1934–40); Pennant number V-105 (1940)
- Fate: Struck a mine and sank in the Norwegian Sea off Bergen, Norway on 11 April 1940.

General characteristics
- Type: Converted trawler
- Tonnage: 268 GRT, 104 NRT
- Length: 38.30 m (125 ft 8 in)
- Beam: 7.37 m (24 ft 2 in)
- Depth: 2.90 m (9 ft 6 in)
- Installed power: Triple expansion engine, 54nhp
- Propulsion: Single screw propeller
- Speed: 11 knots (20 km/h; 13 mph)
- Complement: ~11

V 105 Cremon was a German trawler built in 1922 which was converted into a Vorpostenboot for the Kriegsmarine during World War II.

== Description ==
Cremon was 38.30 metres (125 ft 8 in) long, with a beam of 7.37 metres (24 ft 2 in) and a depth of 2.90 metres (9 ft 6 in). She was powered by a triple expansion steam engine which had cylinders of 33 centimetres (13 in), 59.8 centimetres (23 9/16 in) and 85 centimetres (33 1/2 in) diameter by 57 centimetres (22 5/8 in) stroke. The engine was built by Reiherstieg Schiffswerfte & Maschinenfabrik A. G., Hamburg, Germany. It was rated at 54nhp, driving a single screw propeller. It could propel the ship at 11 knots (20 km/h). Cremon was assessed at 268 GRT, 104 NRT.

== History ==
Cremon was a fishing trawler built by Reiherstieg Schiffswerfte & Maschinenfabrik A.G., Hamburg in 1922 for the Deutsche Hochsee-fischerei Bremen-Cuxhaven. Her port of registry was Cuxhaven and the Code Letters RDGJ were allocated. In 1934, her Code Letters were changed to DHEM.

Cremon was requisitioned by the Kriegsmarine on 1 October 1939. She served as an auxiliary patrol boat during the early years of World War II in the 1 Vorpostenflotille, specifically serving off Norway immediately after the German invasion there. During the invasion, Norwegian minelayers frantically mined the harbors that German ships would soon occupy. One of these minelayers, HNoMS Tyr, laid over twenty mines between Lerøy Island and Sotra and around Vatlestraumen. Since no minesweepers were available in the area, the two support vessels Schiff 9 and Cremon were outfitted in mine clearing gear and sent to clear the area of mines. Schiff 9 struck a mine and sank in less than two minutes, and when Cremon moved to rescue survivors she too struck a mine and exploded. Around six of her crew were killed, five survived.
