= Port letter and number =

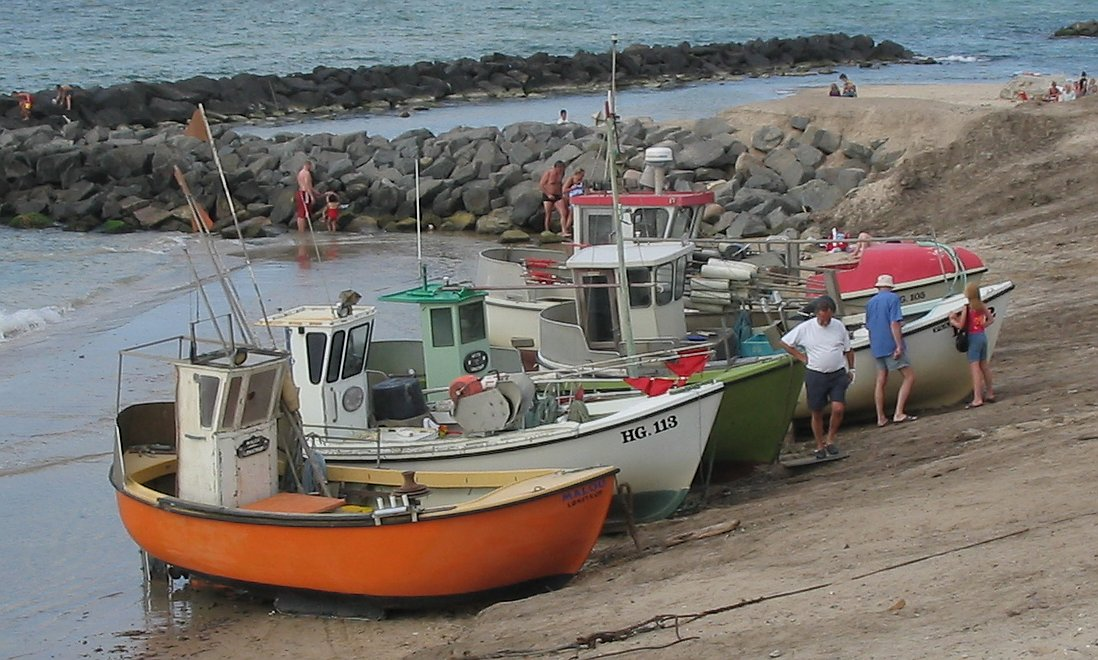
Danish fishing vessels identified with the port letter HG (Hjoring)

Port letter and number (PLN) is a code identifying fishing vessels and other boats printed on the boat. This is used in Europe, including the United Kingdom. The format is XYZ123.
