= Minesweeper flotilla (Kriegsmarine) =

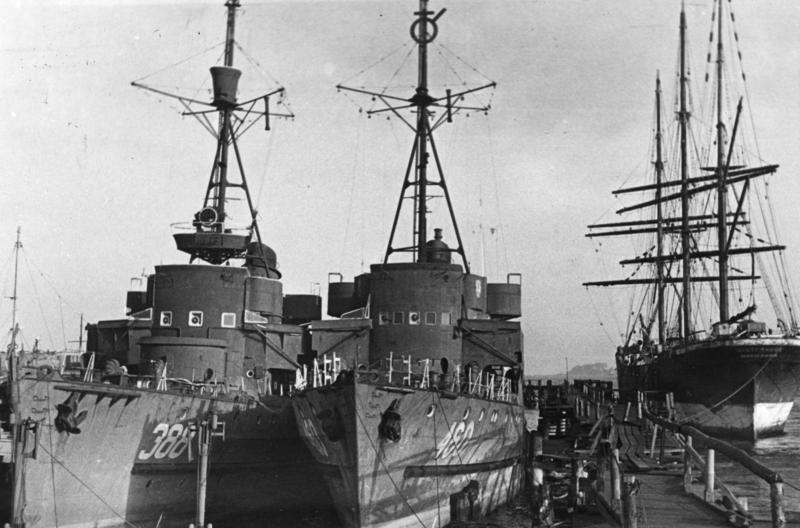
German minesweepers moored together

Minesweeper flotillas of the Kriegsmarine were administrative units which grouped German minesweepers together. There were three types of minesweeper flotillas: standard minesweepers, auxiliary minesweepers, and "mine barrage" vessels. Flotilla commanders operated from a shore office, and were usually commanded by an officer ranked as a Korvettenkapitän. All minesweeper flotillas were under the command of the Führer der Minensuchboote (Leader of Minesweepers) which, by 1940, had been divided into three separate offices for activities in the North Sea, Baltic Sea, and off the coast of France.

When operationally deployed, the minesweepers were under a separate chain of command under the authority of harbor security commanders.

== Minesweeper flotillas ==
The first minesweeper flotilla of the Kriegsmarine was formed in 1936 from pre-existing units of the Reichsmarine, which had maintained two minesweeper and one auxiliary minesweeper flotillas during the inter-war years. The standard German minesweeper flotilla of World War II contained between seven and fifteen minesweeper class vessels.

List of minesweeper flotillas
Flotilla	Formed	Operational areas	Original vessels assigned	Additional vessels assigned
1st	1936	German Bight (1939), Norway (1940), France (1942), North Sea (1944)	M 1, M 3, M 4, M 5, M 6, M 7, M 8 (Note: Originally, the first flotilla contained the M 1915- and M 1916-class vessels M 66, M 89, M 111, M 122, M 132, and M 146. By 1938, the flotilla had been reformed with M 1935-class vessels.)	M 36, M 37, M 155, M 203, M 204, M 255, M 256
2nd	1936	Danzig (1939), Norway (1940), Netherlands (1942), France (1944)	M 2, M 6, M 9, M 10, M 11, M 12, M 13. (Note: Originally, the second flotilla contained the M 1915- and M 1916-class vessels M 98, M 104, M 117, M 133, and M 145. By 1939, the flotilla had been reformed with M 1935-class vessels.)	M 21, M 25, M 38, M 152, M 153, M 256
3rd	1940	North Sea (1940), Finland (1942)	M 15, M 16, M 17, M 18, M 19, M 22, M 29, M 30.	
4th	1939	Norway (1940), Atlantic Coast (1942)	M 36, M 81, M 101, M 132, M 151, M 203, M 204, M 255 (Note: Originally, the fourth flotilla contained the M 1915- and M 1916-class vessels M 61, M 82, M 84, M 89, M 111, M 132, M 134, and M 136. The flotilla was reformed in 1941 with M 1935-class vessels.)	
5th	1940	North Sea (1940), Baltic Sea (1941), Norway (1943)	M 4, M 23, M 31, M 201, M 202, M 205, M 251, M 252, M 253	
6th	1939	North Sea (1939), French Coast (1943)	M 72, M 104, M 117, M 122, M 126, M 145, M 146	M 38, M 39, M 82, M 83, M 84, M 85, M 102, M 133, M 155, M 156, M 206, M 256, M 265, M 267.
7th	1939	Baltic Sea (1939), North Sea (1941)	M 75, M 84, M 85, M 102, M 122, M 126	M 82, M 83, M 154, M 205, M 206.
8th	1941	French Coast (1941)	M 24, M 26, M 27, M 28, M 32, M 34, M 152, M 254, M 256, M 265, M 277, M 292, M 329, M 370.	
9th	1943	Norway (1943)	M 272, M 273, M 274, M 276, M 306, M 326, M 346, M 348, M 364, M 365.	
10th	1943	Atlantic Coast (1943)	M 236, M 264, M 275, M 307, M 347, M 366, M 367, M 385, M 408, M 428, M 438.	
11th	1943	North Sea (1943)	M 264, M 291, M 307, M 327, M 329, M 347, M 348, M 368, M 386.	
12th	1944	Baltic Sea (1944)	M 601, M 602, M 603, M 604, M 605, M 612, M 801, M 802, M 803, M 804.	
13th	1939	Baltic Sea (1939), Norway (1940), Netherlands (1942)	M 1301, M 1302, M 1303, M 1304, M 1305, M 1306, M 1307, M 1308	
14th	1939	Baltic Sea (1939)	M 1401, M 1402, M 1403, M 1404, M 1405, M 1406, M 1407, M 1408	
15th	1939	Baltic Sea (1939), Norway (1940)	M 1501, M 1502, M 1503, M 1504, M 1505, M 1506, M 1507, M 1508	
16th	1939	North Sea (1939), France (1943)	M 1601, M 1602, M 1603, M 1604, M 1605, M 1606, M 1607, M 1608, M 1609	
17th	1939	Baltic Sea (1939), Norway (1940)	M 1701, M 1702, M 1703, M 1704, M 1705, M 1706, M 1707, M 1708.	
18th	1939	North Sea (1939), Northern France (1942)	M 1801, M 1802, M 1803, M 1804, M 1805, M 1806, M 1807, M 1808.	
19th	1939	Baltic Sea (1939)	M 1901, M 1902, M 1903, M 1904, M 1905, M 1906, M 1907, M 1908.	
21st	1942	Norway (1942)	M 82, M 103, M 261, M 305, M 323, M 324, M 327, M 341, M 342, M 343, M 362, M 383.	M 504, M 526, M 545.
22nd	1941	North Sea (1941), Norway (1943), Baltic Sea (1945)	M 301, M 302, M 303, M 321, M 322, M 361, M 368, M 381, M 382, M 436.	
23rd	1942	Norway (1942), Baltic Sea (1945)	M 324, M 401, M 411, M 423, M 431, M 441, M 443, M 467, M 468.	
24th	1942	English Channel (1942)	M 343, M 402, M 412, M 422, M 432, M 442, M 452, M 475, M 483.	
25th	1942	North Sea (1942), Baltic Sea (1944)	M 278, M 294, M 295, M 328, M 330, M 341, M 342, M 403, M 413, M 423, M 433, M 443, M 451, M 453, M 459, M 460	
26th	1943	French Coast (1943)	M 404, M 424, M 434, M 444, M 454, M 476, M 486, M 495	
27th	1943	North Sea (1943), Netherlands (1944)	M 261, M 271, M 304, M 323, M 327, M 329, M 362, M 369, M 4ß5, M 414, M 425, M 434, M 435, M 461, M 469, M 471, M 484.	
28th	1942	English Channel (1942), French Coast (1943)	M 262, M 271, M 304, M 325, M 344, M 345, M 363, M 384, M 463.	
29th	1943	Norway (1943)	Reserve command for the 19th Minesweeper Flotilla	M 406, M 415, M 426, M 436, M 445, M 455, M 462, M 470.
30th	1943	Norway (1943)	Reserve command for the 15th Minesweeper Flotilla	M 403, M 406, M 415, M 426, M 436, M 445, M 455, M 462, M 470.
31st	1940	North Sea (1940), Baltic Sea (1942)	M 3101, M 3102, M 3103, M 3104, M 3105, M 3106, M 3107, M 3108, M 3109, M 3110, M 3111, M 3112, M 3113, M 3114, M 3115, M 3116, M 3117, M 3118, M 3119, M 3120, M 3121, M 3122, M 3123, M 3124, M 3125, M 3126, M 3127, M 3128, M 3129, M 3130, M 3131, M 3132, M 3133, M 3134, M 3135, M 3136, M 3137, M 3138, M 3139.	
32nd	1940	Netherlands (1940), Scheldt River (1944)	M 3200, M 3201, M 3202, M 3203, M 3204, M 3205, M 3206, M 3207, M 3208, M 3209, M 3210, M 3211, M 3212, M 3213, M 3214, M 3215, M 3216, M 3217, M 3218, M 3219, M 3220, M 3221, M 3222, M 3223, M 3224, M 3225, M 3226, M 3227, M 3230, M 3231, M 3232, M 3233, M 3234, M 3235, M 3236, M 3237, M 3238, M 3239, M 3240, M 3241, M 3242.	
34th	1940	Netherlands (1940)	M 3400, M 3401, M 3402, M 3403, M 3404, M 3405, M 3406, M 3407, M 3408, M 3409, M 3410, M 3411, M 3412, M 3413, M 3414, M 3415, M 3416, M 3417, M 3418, M 3419, M 3420, M 3421, M 3422, M 3423, M 3424, M 3425, M 3426, M 3430, M 3431, M 3432, M 3433, M 3434, M 3435, M 3436, M 3437, M 3438, M 3439, M 3440, M 3441, M 3442 M 3443, M 3444, M 3445.	
36th	1940	Denmark (1940)	M 3600, M 3601, M 3602, M 3603, M 3604, M 3605, M 3606, M 3607, M 3608, M 3609, M 3610, M 3611, M 3612, M 3613, M 3614, M 3615, M 3616, M 3617, M 3618, M 3619, M 3620, M 3621, M 3622,M 3623, M 3624, M 3625, M 3626, M 3627, M 3630, M 3631, M 3632, M 3633, M 3634, M 3635, M 3636, M 3637, M 3638, M 3639.	
38th	1940	English Channel (1940)	M 3800, M 3801, M 3802, M 3810, M 3811, M 3812, M 3813, M 3814, M 3815, M 3816, M 3817, M 3818, M 3819, M 3820, M 3821, M 3822, M 3823, M 3824, M 3825, M 3826, M 3827, M 3828, M 3829, M 3830, M 3831, M 3832, M 3833, M 3834, M 3835, M 3836, M 3837, M 3838, M 3840, M 3841, M 3846, M 3848, M 3851, M 3852, M 3853, M 3854, M 3855, M 3856, M 3857, M 3860, M 3861, M 3862, M 3863, M 3864, M 3865, M 3866, M 3867, M 3868, M 3869, M 3870, M 3871, M 3872, M 3873, M 3874, M 3875, M 3880, M 3881, M 3882, M 3883, M 3884, M 3885, M 3886, M 3887, M 3889, M 3890, M 3891, M 3892, M 3893, M 3894, M 3895, M 3896.	
40th	1940	French Coast (1940)	M 4000, M 4001, M 4002, M 4003, M 4004, M 4005, M 4006, M 4007, M 4008, M 4009, M 4010, M 4011, M 4012, M 4013, M 4014, M 4020, M 4021, M 4022, M 4023, M 4024, M 4030, M 4031, M 4032, M 4033, M 4040, M 4041, M 4042, M 4043, M 4044, M 4045, M 4046, M 4047, M 4055.	
42nd	1940	Atlantic Coast (1940)	M 4202, M 4203, M 4204, M 4205, M 4206, M 4207, M 4208, M 4209, M 4211, M 4212, M 4213, M 4214, M 4215, M 4216, M 4217, M 4218, M 4219, M 4221, M 4222, M 4223, M 4224, M 4225, M 4226, M 4227, M 4230, M 4231, M 4232, M 4233, M 4234, M 4235, M 4236, M 4237, M 4238, M 4241, M 4242, M 4243, M 4245, M 4246.	
44th	1940	French-Atlantic Coast (1940)	M 4401, M 4402, M 4403, M 4404, M 4405, M 4406, M 4407, M 4408, M 4409, M 4410, M 4411, M 4412, M 4413, M 4414, M 4415, M 4416, M 4417, M 4421, M 4422, M 4423, M 4424, M 4425, M 4426, M 4427, M 4428, M 4429, M 4430, M 4431, M 4432, M 4433, M 4434, M 4435, M 4436, M 4437, M 4438, M 4440, M 4441, M 4442, M 4443, M 4444, M 4445, M 4446, M 4447, M 4448, M 4449, M 4450, M 4451, M 4452, M 4453, M 4454, M 4455, M 4456, M 4457, M 4458, M 4459, M 4460, M 4461, MM 4462, M 4463, M 4464, M 4465, M 4470, M 4471, M 4472, M 4473, M 4474, M 4475.	
46th	1941	French-Atlantic Coast (1940)	M 4600, M 4601, M 4602, M 4603, M 4604, M 4605, M 4606, M 4607, M 4608, M 4609, M 4610, M 4611, M 4612, M 4613, M 4614, M 4615, M 4616, M 4617, M 4618, M 4619, M 4620, M 4621, M 4622, M 4623, M 4624, M 4625, M 4628.	
52nd	1940	Norway	M 5201, M 5202, M 5203, M 5204, M 5205, M 5206, M 5207, M 5208, M 5209, M 5210.	
54th	1940	Norway	M 5401, M 5402, M 5403, M 5404, M 5405, M 5406, M 5407, M 5408, M 5409, M 5410, M 5411, M 5412	
56th	1940	Norway	M 5601, M 5602, M 5603, M 5604, M 5605, M 5606, M 5607, M 5608, M 5609, M 5610, M 5611, M 5612, M 5613, M 5614, M 5615, M 5616, M 5617, M 5618, M 5619, M 5620, M 5621, M 5622v, M 5623, M 5624, M 5631, M 5632.	
70th	1943	Italy	M 7002, M 7003, M 7004, M 7005, M 7006, M 7007, M 7008, M 7009, M 7010, M 7011, M 7012, M 7013, M 7014, M 7015, M 7016, M 7017, M 7018, M 7019, M 7020, M 7021, M 7022, M 7030, M 7031, M 7032, M 7033, M 7034, M 7601, M 7602, M 7603, M 7604, M 7605, M 7606, M 7607, M 7608.	

== Auxiliary Minesweeper flotillas ==
In addition to the standard minesweeper flotillas, twenty "auxiliary minesweeper" (R boat) flotillas (Räumboots-Flottille) were formed during the Second World War.

1. Räumboots-Flottille

Established in October 1937, with boats: R 17, R 18, R 19, R 20, R 21, R 22, R 23, R 24.

- Other boats assigned during its existence: R 43, R 52, R 65, R 66, R 67, R 68, R 69, R 70, R 71, R 72, R 73, R 74, R 75, R 76, R 106, R 119, R 120, R 127, R 128, R 145, R 150, R 249, R 259, R 260, R 268.
- Escort ship assigned: Nettelbeck, Nordpol.

2. Räumboots-Flottille

Established in November 1938, with boats: R 25, R 26, R 27, R 28, R 29, R 30, R 31, R 32.

- Other boats assigned during its existence: R 74, R 77, R 84, R 86, R 113, R 114, R 116, R 125, R 129, R 169.
- In 1945 was composed by boats: R 412, R 413, R 414, R 415, R 416, R 417.
- Escort ship assigned: tender Brommy.

3. Räumboots-Flottille

Established in 1939 at Pillau, with boats: R 33, R 34, R 35, R 36, R 37, R 38, R 39, R 40.

- Other boats assigned during its existence: R 163, R 164, R 165, R 166, R 196, R 197, R 203, R 204, R 205, R 206, R 207, R 208, R 209, R 216, R 248.
- Escort ship assigned: tender Von der Groeben.
- In 1945 was composed by boats: R 270, R 288, R 289, R 418, R 420, R 421, R 422, R 423.
  - Escort ship assigned: Gazelle.

4. Räumboots-Flottille

Established in April 1940, with boats: R 41, R 42, R 43, R 44, R 45, R 46, R 47, R 48, R 49, R 50, R 51, R 52.

- Other boats assigned during its existence: R 80, R 83, R 115, R 120, R 126, R 128, R 138, R 143, R 150, R 218, R 240, R 243, R 244, R 245, R 246, R 255, R 262, R 274, R 275, R 290, R 291.

5. Räumboots-Flottille

Established in August 1939, with boats: R 1, R 3, R 4, R 5, R 6, R 7, R 8, R 9, R 10, R 11, R 12, R 13.

- In 1941 was composed by boats: R 53, R 54, R 55, R 56, R 57, R 58, R 59, R 60, R 61, R 62, R 63, R 64.
- Other boats assigned during its existence: R 89, R 90, R 113, R 121, R 122, R 124, R 238, R 250, R 269, R 273.
- Escort ship assigned: Elbe.

6. Räumboots-Flottille

Established in July 1941 at Cuxhaven, with boats: R 9, R 10, R 11, R 12, R 13, R 14, R 15, R 16.

- Other boats assigned during its existence: R 1, R 3, R 4, R 6, R 7, R 8, R 115, R 187, RA 10 (former English motor torpedo boat), and RD-boats: RD 116, RD 117, RD 118, RD 119, RD 120, RD 121, RD 122, RD 127, RD 128, RD 129, RD 130, RD 131.

7. Räumboots-Flottille

Established in October 1940, with boats: R 151, R 152, R 153, R 154, R 155, R 156, R 157, R 158, R 159, R 160, R 161, R 162.

- Other boats assigned during its existence: R 173, R 202, R 223, R 262, R 277.
- Escort ship assigned: Weser

8. Räumboots-Flottille

Established in January 1942, with boats: R 92, R 93, R 94, R 95, R 96, R 97, R 98, R 99, R 100, R 101.

- Other boats assigned during its existence: R 113, R 117, R 118, R 130, R 146, R 147, R 257, R 258, R 409.
- Escort ship assigned: Nadir, Schwertfisch.

9. Räumboots-Flottille

Established in May–June 1942 at Rotterdam.

- Boats assigned during its existence: R 85, R 87, R 88, R 103, R 104, R 105, R 107, R 108, R 109, R 110, R 111, R 112, R 131, R 148, R 149, R 247, R 251, R 412, R 413, R 414, R 415, R 416, R 417.
- Escort ship assigned: Alders.

10. Räumboots-Flottille

Established in February–March 1942 at Cuxhaven

- Boats assigned during its existence: R 175, R 176, R 177, R 179, R 180, R 181, R 182, R 183, R 184, R 190, R 213, R 217, R 218, R 219, R 221, R 222, R 224, R 234.
- Escort ship assigned: von der Lippe.

11. Räumboots-Flottille

Established in September 1939, with 8 fishing trawlers and 1 escort ship. In October 1940, was renamed 7th Minesweeper Flotilla and assigned purpose-built R-boats.

- Boats assigned during its existence, from 1942: R 39, R 161, R 162, R 189, R 192, R 198, R 199, R 200, R 201, R 212, R 215, RD 102, RD 103, RD 104, RD 105, RD 109, RD 111, RD 112, RD 113, RD 114, RD 148, RD 149, RA 252, RA 253, RA 254, RA 258, RA 260, RA 261, RA 262, RA 263, RA 264, RA 267, RA 268.

12. Räumboots-Flottille

Established in May 1942 at Bruges; then moved into the Mediterranean. Dissolved in February 1945.

- Boats assigned during its existence: R 34, R 38, R 40, R 178, R 185, R 186, R 188, R 190, R 191, R 194, R 195, R 210, R 211.
- Escort ship assigned: von der Groeben.

13. Räumboots-Flottille

Established on 15 November 1943; used in the German Bight. In 1957, the flotilla was transferred to the new German Navy (Bundesmarine) from the German Mine Sweeping Administration.

- Boats assigned during its existence: R 132, R 133, R 134, R 135, R 136, R 137, R 138, R 139, R 140, R 141, R 142, R 144, R 177, R 252.
- Escort ship assigned: Nordsee.

14. Räumboots-Flottille

Established in December 1943; used in the English Channel. After the invasion of France in June 1944 was used in the German Bight and the Baltic Sea.

- Boats assigned during its existence: R 18, R 214, R 219, R 225, R 226, R 227, R 228, R 229, R 230, R 231, R 232, R 233, R 235, R 236, R 237, R 242, R 259, R 263
- Escort ship assigned: Barbara.

15. Räumboots-Flottille

Established on 1 July 1944; used in the Baltic Sea, including Finnish waters. Disbanded after the German surrender.

- Boats assigned during its existence: R 239, R 240, R 241, R 243, R 244, R 245, R 254, R 255, R 256, R 409, R 410, R 411.

16. Räumboots-Flottille

Established in October 1944, main base Haugesund, Norway. Dissolved on 25 November 1947.

- Boats assigned during its existence: R 264, R 266, R 267, R 401, R 402, R 403, R 404, R 405, R 406, R 407, R 408, R 424.

17. Räumboots-Flottille

Established in July 1944 with school and training boats; initially named Räumbootsflottille zbV, and used in the Baltic Sea. Dissolved late 1947.

- Boats assigned during its existence: R 55, R 71, R 102, R 167, R 170, R 174, R 175, R 176, R 181, R 220, R 241, R 246, R 249, R 290.

21. Räumboots-Flottille

Established in July 1943. The flotilla consisted of 12 large escort minesweepers (Geleit-Räumbooten) based at Bergen, Norway. Dissolved early 1946.

- Boats assigned during its existence: R 301, R 302, R 303, R 304, R 305, R 306, R 307, R 308, R 309, R 310, R 311, R 312.

25. Räumboots-Flottille

Established in the summer of 1945 at Denmark with boats from various flotillas, for the German Mine Sweeping Administration. Dissolved early 1946.

- Boats assigned during its existence: R 18, R 23, R 65, R 234, R 254, R 257, R 258, R 409, R 410, R 411.
- Escort ship assigned: Riegel.

30. Räumboots-Flottille

Established in June 1943 with small Dutch minesweepers and moved into the Black Sea. Dissolved in August 1944.

- Boats assigned during its existence: R 30, RA 51, RA 52, RA 54, RA 56.

== Mine Barrage flotillas ==
Mine barrage flotillas (Sperrbrecherflottille) were composed of auxiliary naval ships and merchant vessels that had been converted to enter minefields ahead of other ships in order to detonate enemy mines. These Sperrbrecher vessels were heavily armored and were occasionally outfitted as anti-aircraft platforms. The Kriegsmarine first organized the mine barrage vessels into Speerbrechergruppe (mine barrage groups) at the start of World War II. Each group contained various auxiliary vessels designated by roman numerals augmented by a naval tender.

Original mine barrage groups

- Group One: Sperrbrecher X, XI, & XII
- Group Two: Sperrbrecher I, II, III
- Group Three: Never formed
- Group Four: Sperrbrecher IV, V, VI
- Group Five: Never formed
- Group Six: Sperrbrecher VIII, IX

In June 1940, the Kriegsmarine formed a mine barrage unit in the Low Countries known as Sperrbrechergruppe Niederlande. Shortly thereafter, the Kriegsmarine began to designate mine barrage vessels with capital letters, but only three such vessels were ever declared (Sperrbrecher A, B, & C). By late 1940, the mine barrage vessels were designated with standard numbers while the mine barrage groups were re-designated as flotillas. Eight flotillas were authorized with seven eventually formed; the standard rank for a mine barrage flotilla commander was Fregattenkapitän. As the Sperrbrecher ships were mostly auxiliary vessels, the flotillas were considered administrative in nature and operated from shore offices.

Mine barrage flotillas
Flotilla	Formed	Predecessor unit	Operating areas	Vessels assigned
1. Sperrbrecherflottille	September 1940	1 Sperrbrechergruppe	Baltic Sea (1940), German Bight (1942)	Sperrbrecher 10, 11, 12, 13, 15, 17, 22, 27, 29, 36, 133, 138, 160, 161, 163, 164, 167, 169, 173, 176, 177
2. Sperrbrecherflottille	June 1941	2, 4, & 6 Sperrbrechergruppe	French Coast (1941), Normandy (1944)	Sperrbrecher 1, 2, 3, 4, 5, 6, 7, 8, 9, 14, 16, 19, 20, 21, 32, 34, 35, 36, 122, 136, 137, 146, 153, 163, 168, 175, 178
3. Sperrbrecherflottille	October 1940	1. Vorpostenflottille	Baltic Sea (1940)	Sperrbrecher 13, 14, 18, 22, 23, 24, 25, 33, 34, 35, 36, 37, 38, 120, 131, 139, 145, 148, 158, 161, 165, 166, 172, 181, 185
4. Sperrbrecherflottille	September 1940	Sperrbrechergruppe Niederlande	English Channel (1940), French Coast (1943)	Sperrbrecher 21, 102, 120, 141, 142, 143, 144, 145, 146, 147, 148, 149, 150, 167, 168, 170, 171, 183, 184; Flußsperrbrecher 201, 202, 203, 204
5. Sperrbrecherflottille	November 1941	4. Sperrbrecherflottille	North Sea	Reserve unit for the 4th mine barrage flotilla. Disbanded to form the 8th flotilla in December 1941
6. Sperrbrecherflottille	July 1941	2. Sperrbrecherflottille	French Coast (1941)	Sperrbrecher 1, 4, 6, 8, 9, 19, 121, 134, 135, 157, 162, 170, 171, 174, 180
8. Sperrbrecherflottille	December 1941	5. Sperrbrecherflottille	North Sea (1941), Netherlands Coast (1943), Denmark Coast (1944)	Sperrbrecher 26, 28, 33, 102, 145, 147, 148, 149, 150, 153, 154, 179, 185, 190; Flußsperrbrecher 201, 202, 203, 204, 205

=== Support craft and tenders ===
In addition to the standard Sperrbrecher craft, some flotillas possessed support and tender vessels for refit and supply duties

Mine barrage support vessels

- Flak defense ship 28 (1st Flotilla)
- Artillery boat K4 (1st Flotilla)
- Control ship Möwe (1st Flotilla)
- Control ship F4 (2nd Flotilla)
- Night patrol ship Togo (3rd Flotilla)
- Steamship Frisia IX (8th Flotilla)
- Tender Hamburg (1st Flotilla)
