= List of ship launches in 1937 =

The list of ship launches in 1937 includes a chronological list of some ships launched in 1937.

Date	Ship	Class / type	Builder	Location	Country	Notes
8 January	Spencer	Treasury-class cutter	Brooklyn Navy Yard	Brooklyn, New York	United States	For United States Coast Guard.
12 January	Henley	Bagley-class destroyer	Mare Island Navy Yard	Vallejo, California	United States	For United States Navy
14 January	Bibb	Treasury-class cutter	Charleston Navy Yard	Charleston, South Carolina	United States	For United States Coast Guard.
14 January	May	Lightship tenderCommissioners of Irish Lights.	Harland & Wolff	Belfast	United Kingdom	For
27 January	Comara	Coaster	Harland & Wolff	Belfast	United Kingdom	For North Coast Steam Navigation Company.
28 January	Adula	Tanker	Blythswood Shipbuilding Co. Ltd.	Glasgow	United Kingdom	For Anglo-Saxon Petroleum Co. Ltd.
28 January	Ilex	I-class destroyer	John Brown & Company	Clydebank	United Kingdom	For Royal Navy.
January	Linda Lou	Tank barge	Alabama Drydock and Shipbuilding Company	Mobile, Alabama	United States	For Citizen's Oil Co. Inc.
7 February	Admiral Hipper	Admiral Hipper-class cruiser	Blohm + Voss	Hamburg	Germany	For Kriegsmarine.
11 February	Ivanhoe	I-class destroyer	Yarrow Shipbuilders	Scotstoun	United Kingdom	For Royal Navy.
11 February	Rochester Castle	Refrigerated cargo ship	Harland & Wolff	Belfast	United Kingdom	For Union-Castle Line.
20 February	Hans Rolshoven	Krischan-class seaplane tender			Germany	For the Luftwaffe.
25 February	Torr Head	Cargo ship	Harland & Wolff	Belfast	United Kingdom	For Ulster Steamship Co.
February	CNSC Mojarra	Tank barge	Alabama Drydock and Shipbuilding Company	Mobile, Alabama	United States	For CN San Cristobal S.A.
1 March	Impulsive	I-class destroyer	J. Samuel White	Cowes	United Kingdom	For Royal Navy.
6 March	Nederland	Tanker	Wilton-Fijenoord	Schiedam	Netherlands	For Nederlandsche Pacific Petroleum Maatschappij
11 March	Salacia	Cargo ship	Harland & Wolff	Belfast	United Kingdom	For Donaldson Line.
12 March	Erich Giese	Type 1934A-class destroyer	Germaniawerft	Kiel	Germany	For Kriegsmarine.
13 March	Somers	Somers-class destroyer	Federal Shipbuilding and Drydock Company	Kearny, New Jersey	United States	For United States Navy.
16 March	Lady Sylvia	Ferry	Harland & Wolff	Belfast	United Kingdom	For Union Steamship Co.
18 March	Erich Koellner	Type 1934A-class destroyer	Germaniawerft	Kiel	Germany	For Kriegsmarine
21 March	Friedrich Eckoldt	Type 1934A-class destroyer	Blohm & Voss	Hamburg	Germany	For Kriegsmarine.
23 March	Friesenland	Friesenland-class seaplane carrier	Howaldtswerke	Kiel	Germany	For civilian service.
24 March	Liverpool	Town-class cruiser	Fairfield Shipbuilding and Engineering Company	Govan	United Kingdom	For Royal Navy.
25 March	Roxburgh Castle	Refrigerated cargo ship	Harland & Wolff	Belfast	United Kingdom	For Union-Castle Line.
March	CNSC Cornuda	Tank barge	Alabama Drydock and Shipbuilding Company	Mobile, Alabama	United States	For CN San Cristobal S.A..
March	CNSC Delfin	Tank barge	Alabama Drydock and Shipbuilding Company	Mobile, Alabama	United States	For CN San Cristobal S.A..
March	CNSC 280	Tank barge	Alabama Drydock and Shipbuilding Company	Mobile, Alabama	United States	For CN San Cristobal S.A..
March	CNSC 281	Tank barge	Alabama Drydock and Shipbuilding Company	Mobile, Alabama	United States	For CN San Cristobal S.A..
March	CNSC 282	Tank barge	Alabama Drydock and Shipbuilding Company	Mobile, Alabama	United States	For CN San Cristobal S.A..
March	CNSC 283	Tank barge	Alabama Drydock and Shipbuilding Company	Mobile, Alabama	United States	For CN San Cristobal S.A..
March	CNSC 284	Tank barge	Alabama Drydock and Shipbuilding Company	Mobile, Alabama	United States	For CN San Cristobal S.A..
March	CNSC 285	Tank barge	Alabama Drydock and Shipbuilding Company	Mobile, Alabama	United States	For CN San Cristobal S.A..
10 April	Nieuw Amsterdam	Ocean liner	N.V. Rotterdam Drydock Company	Rotterdam	Netherlands	For Holland America Line.
12 April	Delius	Cargo ship	Harland & Wolff	Belfast	United Kingdom	For Lamport & Holt.
12 April	Manchester	Town-class cruiser	R. & W. Hawthorn, Leslie and Company	Hebburn	United Kingdom	For Royal Navy.
15 April	Köln	Fishing trawler	Schulte & Bruns	Emden	Germany	For Emder Heringfischerei AG.
22 April	Boardale	Tanker	Harland & Wolff	Belfast	United Kingdom	For British Tanker Company.
24 April	Porjus	Fishing trawler	Flenderwerft	Lübeck	Germany	For For Afrikanische Frucht-Compagnie A.G.
5 May	Almuth	Fishing trawler	Schulte & Bruns	Emden	Germany	For Leerer Heringfischerei AG.
5 May	Wilhelm Gustloff	Passenger ship	Blohm + Voss	Hamburg	Germany	For Hamburg Süd.
6 May	Patterson	Bagley-class destroyer	Puget Sound Navy Yard	Bremerton, Washington	United States	For United States Navy.
8 May	Savannah	Brooklyn-class cruiser	New York Shipbuilding Corporation	Camden, New Jersey	United States	For United States Navy.
8 June	Blücher	Admiral Hipper-class cruiser	Deutsche Werke	Kiel	Germany	For Kriegsmarine.
8 June	Afridi	Tribal-class destroyer	Vickers-Armstrongs	Walker	United Kingdom	For Royal Navy.
8 June	Cossack	Tribal-class destroyer	Vickers-Armstrongs	Walker	United Kingdom	For Royal Navy.
8 June	Mars	Fishing trawler	Schulte & Bruns	Emden	Germany	For Dollart Heringfischerei AG.
16 June	Teutonia	Fishing trawler	Deutsche Werke	Hamburg	Germany	For N. Ebsling.
22 June	British Integrity	Tanker	Vickers-Armstrongs	Govan	United Kingdom	For British Tanker Company.
23 June	Birka	Passenger ship	Flensburger Schiffbau-Gesellschaft	Flensburg	Germany	For Mathies Reederei KG.
24 June	Leinster	Ferry	Harland & Wolff	Belfast	United Kingdom	For British & Irish Steam Packet Co.
7 July	Gurkha	Tribal-class destroyer	Fairfield Shipbuilding & Engineering Company	Govan	United Kingdom	For Royal Navy.
14 July	Bittern	Bittern-class sloop	J. Samuel White	Cowes	United Kingdom	For Royal Navy.
25 July	Vittorio Veneto	Littorio-class battleship	Cantieri Riuniti dell'Adriatico	Trieste	Italy	For Regia Marina.
5 August	Donaghadee	Collier	Harland & Wolff	Belfast	United Kingdom	For John Kelly Ltd.
14 August	Blue	Bagley-class destroyer	Norfolk Naval Shipyard	Portsmouth, Virginia	United States	For United States Navy.
18 August	Nordkapp	Nordkapp-class fishery protection vessel	Royal Norwegian Navy Shipyard	Horten	Norway	For Royal Norwegian Navy.
19 August	Diether von Roeder	Type 1936-class destroyer	DeSchiMAG	Bremen	Germany	For Kriegsmarine.
22 August	Littorio	Littorio-class battleship	Gio. Ansaldo & C.	Sestri Ponente	Italy	For Regia Marina.
24 August	Somali	Tribal-class destroyer	Swan Hunter & Wigham Richardson	Wallsend	United Kingdom	For Royal Navy.
26 August	Honolulu	Brooklyn-class cruiser	New York Naval Yard	Brooklyn, New York	United States	For United States Navy.
2 September	Broomdale	Tanker	Harland & Wolff	Belfast	United Kingdom	For British Tanker Company.
2 September	Maori	Tribal-class destroyer	Fairfield Shipbuilding & Engineering Company	Govan	United Kingdom	For Royal Navy.
3 September	Eskimo	Tribal-class destroyer	Vickers-Armstrongs	Walker	United Kingdom	For Royal Navy.
3 September	Mashona	Tribal-class destroyer	Vickers-Armstrongs	Walker	United Kingdom	For Royal Navy.
23 September	Capetown Castle	Passenger ship	Harland & Wolff	Belfast	United Kingdom	For Union-Castle Line.
23 September	Zulu	Tribal-class destroyer	Alexander Stephen and Sons	Govan	United Kingdom	For Royal Navy.
25 September	Gauleiter Telschow	Fishing trawler	Schiffbau-Gesellschaft Unterweser	Wesermünde	Germany	For For Hussmann & Hahn.
September	Dorum	Fishing trawler	Deschimag	Wesermünde	Germany	For Ernst Glässel.
2 October	Nashville	Brooklyn-class cruiser	New York Shipbuilding Corporation	Camden, New Jersey	United States	For United States Navy.
5 October	Undine	U-class submarine	Vickers Armstrong	Barrow-in-Furness	United Kingdom	For Royal Navy.
6 October	Matabele	Tribal-class destroyer	Scotts Shipbuilding and Engineering Company	Greenock	United Kingdom	For Royal Navy.
9 October	Gulfwave	Tanker	Bethlehem Steel Company	Sparrows Point, Maryland	United States	For Gulf Oil Corporation.
15 October	Mohawk	Tribal-class destroyer	John I. Thornycroft & Company	Woolston, Hampshire	United Kingdom	For Royal Navy.
19 October	Gloucester	Town-class cruiser	Devonport Dockyard	Devonport	United Kingdom	For Royal Navy.
20 October	Gebrüder Kähler	Fishing trawler	H. C. Stülcken Sohn	Hamburg	Germany	For Hinrich Foch Hochseefischerei AG.
21 October	Barbarian	Bar-class boom defence vessel	Blyth Dry Docks & Shipbuilding Co. Ltd	Blyth, Northumberland	United Kingdom	For Royal Navy.
21 October	Delane	Cargo ship	Harland & Wolff	Belfast	United Kingdom	For Lamport & Holt.
21 October	Tartar	Tribal-class destroyer	Swan Hunter & Wigham Richardson	Wallsend	United Kingdom	For Royal Navy.
27 October	British Trust	Tanker	Harland & Wolff	Belfast	United Kingdom	For British Tanker Company.
30 October	Albert Leo Schlageter	Gorch Fock-class barque	Blohm + Voss	Hamburg	Germany	For Kriegsmarine.
October	Hermann Bösch	Fishing trawler	Deschimag	Wesermünde	Germany	For C. C. H. Bösch.
3 November	Munster	Ferry	Harland & Wolff	Belfast	United Kingdom	For British & Irish Steam Packet Co.
4 November	British Security	Tanker	Harland & Wolff	Govan	United Kingdom	For British Tanker Company.
5 November	Ashanti	Tribal-class destroyer	William Denny and Brothers	Dumbarton	United Kingdom	For Royal Navy.
16 November	Wichita	Cruiser	Philadelphia Navy Yard	Philadelphia, Pennsylvania	United States	For United States Navy.
November	C-M.L. 50	Tank barge	Alabama Drydock and Shipbuilding Company	Mobile, Alabama	United States	For Agwilines Inc.
1 December	Hans Lüdemann	Type 1936-class destroyer	DeSchiMAG	Bremen	Germany	For Kriegsmarine.
2 December	Cachalot	Grampus-class submarine	Scotts Shipbuilding and Engineering Company	Greenock	United Kingdom	For Royal Navy.
15 December	Barbette	Bar-class boom defence vessel	Blyth Dry Docks & Shipbuilding Co. Ltd	Blyth, Northumberland	United Kingdom	For Royal Navy.
16 December	Koolama	Cargo ship	Harland & Wolff	Belfast	United Kingdom	For West Australian Government.
17 December	Sikh	Tribal-class destroyer	Alexander Stephen & Sons	Linthouse	United Kingdom	For Royal Navy.
18 December	Punjabi	Tribal-class destroyer	Alexander Stephen & Sons	Linthouse	United Kingdom	For Royal Navy.
21 December	Bedouin	Tribal-class destroyer	William Denny and Brothers	Dumbarton	United Kingdom	For Royal Navy.
21 December	Devis	Cargo ship	Harland & Wolff	Belfast	United Kingdom	For Lamport & Holt.
21 December	Nubian	Tribal-class destroyer	John I. Thornycroft & Company	Woolston	United Kingdom	For Royal Navy.
22 December	Franklin	Halcyon-class minesweeper	Ailsa Shipbuilding Company	Troon, Ayrshire	United Kingdom	For Royal Navy.
22 December	Hermann Künne	Type 1936-class destroyer	DeSchiMAG	Bremen	Germany	For Kriegsmarine.
28 December	Otto Bröhan	Fishing trawler	H. C. Stülcken Sohn	Hamburg	Germany	For Cranzer Fischdamper AG.
December	Franz Westermann	Fishing trawler	DeSchiMAG	Bremerhaven	Germany	For Reederei Siebert & Co.
Unknown date	A.G.T No. 32	Tank barge	Alabama Drydock and Shipbuilding Company	Mobile, Alabama	United States	For A. G. Thomas.
Unknown date	A.G.T No. 34	Tank barge	Alabama Drydock and Shipbuilding Company	Mobile, Alabama	United States	For F. L. Stanford.
Unknown date	A.G.T No. 36	Tank barge	Alabama Drydock and Shipbuilding Company	Mobile, Alabama	United States	For A. G. Thomas.
Unknown date	A.G.T No. 38	Tank barge	Alabama Drydock and Shipbuilding Company	Mobile, Alabama	United States	For A. G. Thomas.
Unknown date	Algol	Coastal tanker	Deutsche Werft AG	Hamburg	Germany	For Trelleborgs Angfabrik Nya A/B.
Unknown date	Coastal Petroleum Corp. No. 1	Tank barge	Alabama Drydock and Shipbuilding Company	Mobile, Alabama	United States	For Coastal Petroleum Corp.
Unknown date	Englishman	tug	Cochrane & Sons Ltd.	Selby	United Kingdom	For United Towing Co. Ltd.
Unknown date	Ernst L. M. Russ	Cargo ship	Flensburger Schiff- Gesellschaft.	Flensburg	Germany	For Ernst Russ.
Unknown date	Gabelsflach	Coastal tanker	F Schichau GmbH	Elbing	Germany	For Kriegsmarine.
Unknown date	Gambian	Cargo ship	Deutsche Schiff- und Maschinenbau	Wesermünde	Germany	For United African Company.
Unknown date	Ginnheim	Cargo ship	Burntisland Shipbuilding Co. Ltd.	Burntisland	United Kingdom	For Unterweser Reederei.
Unknown date	Inkosi	Refrigerated cargo liner	Swan, Hunter & Wigham Richardson	Newcastle upon Tyne	United Kingdom	For Charente Steamship Co. Ltd.
Unknown date	Leguy	Dredger	Alabama Drydock and Shipbuilding Company	Mobile, Alabama	United States	For Nello L. Teer Co.
Unknown date	Marie Fisser	Cargo ship	Lübecker Flender-Werke AG	Lübeck	Germany	For Fisser & van Doornum.
Unknown date	Mathias Stinnes	Tanker	Flensburger Schiff- Gesellschaft.	Flensburg	Germany	For Kohlen Import und Poseidon Schiffs.
Unknown date	Messina	Cargo ship	Neptun AG	Rostock	Germany	For Robert Miles Sloman Jr.
Unknown date	Saar	Cargo ship	Stettiner Oderwerke AG	Stettin	Germany	For R. C. Gribel.
Unknown date	Spinel	Cargo ship	Henry Robb Ltd.	Leith	United Kingdom	For William Robertson.
Unknown date	Takoradian	Cargo ship	Deutsche Schiff- und Maschinenbau	Wesermünde	Germany	For United Africa Company.
Unknown date	Titlark II	Motor vessel	J. Bolson & Son Ltd.	Poole	United Kingdom	For J. Bolson & Son Ltd.
Unknown date	Unitas	Whaler	Deutsche Schiff- und Maschinenbau.	Bremen	Germany	For Unitas Deutsche Walfang GmbH.
Unknown date	Unitas 4	Whaler	Bremer Vulkan Schiff- und Mashcinenbau	Bremen	Germany	For Jurgens Van Den Brugh Margarine Verkaufs Union GmbH.
Unknown date	Unitas 5	Whaler	Bremer Vulkan Schiff- und Mashcinenbau	Bremen	Germany	For Jurgens Van Den Brugh Margarine Verkaufs Union GmbH.
Unknown date	Unitas 8	Whaler	Bremer Vulkan Schiff- und Mashcinenbau	Bremen	Germany	For Jurgens Van Den Brugh Margarine Verkaufs Union GmbH.
Unknown date	Unnamed	Tank barge	Alabama Drydock and Shipbuilding Company	Mobile, Alabama	United States	For Orange State Oil Co.
Unknown date	22 unnamed vessels	Tank barges	Alabama Drydock and Shipbuilding Company	Mobile, Alabama	United States	For private owners.
