= List of ship launches in 1939 =

The list of ship launches in 1939 includes a chronological list of all ships launched in 1939.

Date	Ship	Class	Builder	Location	Country	Notes
7 January	Lützow	Admiral Hipper-class cruiser	DeSchiMAG	Bremen	Germany	For Kriegsmarine
9 January	Kingston	K-class destroyer	J. Samuel White	Cowes	United Kingdom	For Royal Navy
17 January	Richelieu	Richelieu-class battleship	Arsenal de Brest	Brest	France	For French Navy
19 January	Seydlitz	Admiral Hipper-class cruiser	DeSchiMAG	Bremen	Germany	For Kriegsmarine
19 January	Bownet	Net-class boom defence vessel	Blyth Dry Docks & Shipbuilding Co. Ltd	Blyth, Northumberland	United Kingdom	For Royal Navy.
19 January	Kelvin	K-class destroyer	Fairfield	Govan	United Kingdom	For Royal Navy
19 January	Kipling	K-class destroyer	Yarrow Shipbuilders	Scotstoun	United Kingdom	For Royal Navy
21 January	Odin	Sleipner-class destroyer	Royal Norwegian Navy Yard	Horten	Norway	For Royal Norwegian Navy
24 January	Royal Daffodil	Pleasure cruise ship	William Denny & Brothers	Dumbarton	United Kingdom	For General Steam Navigation Co. Ltd
24 January	Hatsukaze	Kagerō-class destroyer	Kawasaki-Kobe	Kobe	Japan	For Imperial Japanese Navy
25 January	Bangalow	Coaster	Harland & Wolff	Belfast	United Kingdom	For North Coast Navigation Co.
2 February	Breconshire	Cargo ship	Taikoo Dockyard & Engineering Company of Hong Kong Ltd.	Hong Kong	Hong Kong	For Glen Line Ltd.
6 February	Khartoum	K-class destroyer	Swan Hunter	Tyne and Wear	United Kingdom	For Royal Navy
6 February	British Prudence	Tanker	Sir James Laing & Sons Ltd	Sunderland	United Kingdom	For British Tanker Co Ltd.
14 February	Bismarck	Bismarck-class battleship	Blohm & Voss	Hamburg	Germany	For Kriegsmarine
16 February	Derfflinger	Fishing trawler	Schulte & Bruns,	Emden	Germany	For Großer Kurfürst Heringfischerei AG
21 February	King George V	King George V-class battleship	Vickers-Armstrongs	Newcastle	United Kingdom	For Royal Navy
23 February	Natsushio	Kagerō-class destroyer	Fujinagata Shipyard	Osaka	Japan	For Imperial Japanese Navy
4 March	Klipfontein	Cargo liner	Smit P Jr.	Rotterdam	Netherlands	
4 March	Esso Seakay	Maritime Commission Type N tanker	Sun Shipbuilding	Chester, Pennsylvania	United States	For United States Navy
7 March	Andes	Ocean liner	Harland and Wolff	Belfast	United Kingdom	For Royal Mail Line
14 March	Burgonet	Net-class boom defence vessel	Blyth Dry Docks & Shipbuilding Co. Ltd	Blyth, Northumberland	United Kingdom	For Royal Navy.
15 March	Dogu	Cargo liner	Blohm+Voss	Hamburg	Germany	Requisitioned for Deutsche-Afrika Linien on completion.
21 March	Kandahar	K-class destroyer	William Denny & Brothers	Dumbarton	United Kingdom	For Royal Navy
22 March	Johann Schulte	Fishing trawler	Schulte & Bruns	Emden	Germany	For Großer Kürfurst Heringfischerei AG
23 March	Clan Lamont	Cargo ship	Greenock Dockyard Co. Ltd.	Greenock	United Kingdom	For Clan Line Steamers Ltd.
23 March	Hannover	Cargo liner	Bremer Vulkan	Vegesack	Germany	For Norddeutscher Lloyd
24 March	Yukikaze	Kagerō-class destroyer	Sasebo Naval Arsenal	Sasebo	Japan	For Imperial Japanese Navy
March	Herman Litmeyer	Coaster	Van Diepen Scheepswerf Gebroeders NV	Waterhuizen	Netherlands	For Gebr. Elfring
March	Mars	Cargo liner	DeSchiMAG	Kiel	Germany	For Neptun Line
1 April	Esso New Orleans	Maritime Commission Type N tanker	Sun Shipbuilding	Chester, Pennsylvania	United States	
1 April	Tirpitz	Bismarck-class battleship	Kriegsmarinewerft	Wilhelmshaven	Germany	For Kriegsmarine
4 April	Wasp	Unique aircraft carrier	Newport News Shipbuilding	Newport News, Virginia	United States	For United States Navy
4 April	Kashmir	K-class destroyer	John I. Thornycroft & Company	Woolston	United Kingdom	For Royal Navy
18 April	Flamingo	Black Swan-class sloop	Yarrow Shipbuilders	Glasgow, Scotland	United Kingdom	For Royal Navy
18 April	Shearwater	Kingfisher-class sloop	J. Samuel White	Cowes	United Kingdom	For Royal Navy
19 April	Hayashio	Kagerō-class destroyer	Uraga Dock Company	Uraga	Japan	For Imperial Japanese Navy
20 April	Wellington Star	Refrigerated cargo ship	Harland & Wolff	Belfast	United Kingdom	For Blue Star Line.
3 May	Prince of Wales	King George V-class battleship	Cammell Laird	Birkenhead	United Kingdom	For Royal Navy
3 May	Signet	Net-class boom defence vessel	Blyth Dry Docks & Shipbuilding Co. Ltd	Blyth, Northumberland	United Kingdom	For Royal Navy.
23 May	Theodor Woker	Tug	Harland & Wolff	Belfast	United Kingdom	For Government of South Africa.
1 June	Kimberley	K-class destroyer	John I. Thornycroft & Company	Woolston	United Kingdom	For Royal Navy
2 June	Dragonet	Net-class boom defence vessel	Blyth Dry Docks & Shipbuilding Co. Ltd	Blyth, Northumberland	United Kingdom	For Royal Navy.
17 June	Janus	ferry	Öresundsvarvet	Landskrona	Sweden	For Jahre Line.
19 June	Isokaze	Kagerō-class destroyer	Sasebo Naval Arsenal	Sasebo	Japan	For Imperial Japanese Navy
20 June	Auckland Star	Refrigerated cargo ship	Harland & Wolff	Belfast	United Kingdom	For Blue Star Line.
June	Sachsenwald	Fishing trawler	DeSchiMAG	Geestemünde	Germany	For Nordsee Deutsche Hochseefischerei Bremen-Cuxhaven
3 July	Foreland	Collier	Burntisland Shipbuilding Company	Burntisland	United Kingdom	For Shipping & Coal Co. Ltd.
6 July	T. H. Watermayer	Firefighting tug	A. & J. Inglis Ltd.	Glasgow	United Kingdom	For Railway & Harbours Administration, Government of the Union of South Africa.
7 July	Black Swan	Black Swan-class sloop	Yarrow Shipbuilders	Glasgow, Scotland	United Kingdom	For Royal Navy
7 July	Ariel	Cable laying ship	Swan, Hunter & Wigham Richardson Ltd.	Newcastle upon Tyne	United Kingdom	For H. M. Postmaster General.
12 July	Sonnet	Net-class boom defence vessel	Blyth Dry Docks & Shipbuilding Co. Ltd	Blyth, Northumberland	United Kingdom	For Royal Navy.
15 July	Hav	Cargo ship	Swan, Hunter & Wigham Richardson Ltd.	Newcastle upon Tyne	United Kingdom	For Helmer Staubo & Co.
17 July	Javary	Destroyer	J. Samuel White	Cowes	Brazil	For Brazilian Navy
18 July	Atlantic	Cargo ship	William Gray & Co. Ltd.	West Hartlepool	United Kingdom	For Sir H. Cockerline & Co.
18 July	Glengyle	Cargo ship	Caledon Shipbuilding & Engineering Co. Ltd.	Dundee	United Kingdom	For Blue Funnel Line.
28 July	Robert Dundas	Icemaid type collier	Grangemouth Dockyard Co. Ltd.	Grangemouth	United Kingdom	For Ministry of Shipping. Completed as a Dundas-class coastal stores carrier for the Royal Fleet Auxiliary.
31 July	African Prince	Cargo ship	Furness Shipbuilding Co Ltd	Haverton Hill-on-Tees	United Kingdom	For Prince Line Ltd.
1 August	Thiara	Tanker	Swan, Hunter & Wigham Richardson Ltd.	Newcastle upon Tyne	United Kingdom	For Anglo-Saxon Petroleum Co. Ltd.
1 August	Waiotira	Passenger ship	Harland & Wolff	Belfast	United Kingdom	For Shaw Savill Line.
3 August	Saint Bernard	Cargo ship	William Hamilton & Co. Ltd.	Port Glasgow	United Kingdom	For The Saint Line Ltd.
5 August	Otra	Otra-class minesweeper	Nylands Verksted	Oslo	Norway	For Royal Norwegian Navy
15 August	Clan MacDonald	Cargo ship	Greenock Dockyard Co. Ltd.	Greenock	United Kingdom	For Clan Line Steamers Ltd.
15 August	Cormarsh	Collier	Burntisland Shipbuilding Company	Burntisland	United Kingdom	For Cory Colliers Ltd.
15 August	Oriole	Cargo ship	Henry Robb Ltd.	Leith	United Kingdom	For General Steam Navigation Co. Ltd.
15 August	Spirality	Coaster	Goole Shipbuilding & Repairing Co. Ltd.	Goole	United Kingdom	For F. T. Everard & Sons Ltd.
16 August	Merchant Prince	Cargo ship	William Doxford & Sons Ltd.	Pallion	United Kingdom	For Drake Shipping Co. Ltd.
17 August	Formidable	Illustrious-class aircraft carrier	Harland & Wolff	Belfast	United Kingdom	For Royal Navy
17 August	Port Quebec	Cargo ship	J. L. Thompson & Sons Ltd.	Sunderland	United Kingdom	For Port Line Ltd.
27 August	Helena	St. Louis-class cruiser	New York Naval Shipyard	Brooklyn, New York	United States	For United States Navy
30 August	Donacill	Tanker	Blythswood Shipbuilding Co. Ltd.	Glasgow	United Kingdom	For Anglo-Saxon Petroleum Co. Ltd.
30 August	Hermiston	Cargo ship	Short Brothers Ltd.	Sunderland	United Kingdom	For Carlton Steamship Co. Ltd.
31 August	Karl	Tug	Cochrane & Sons Ltd.	Selby	United Kingdom	For Goteborgs Bogserings & Bargnings Akt. Requisitioned by the Ministry of War Transport, completed as Empire Henchman.
31 August	America	Ocean Liner	Newport News Shipbuilding	Newport News, Virginia	United States	For United States Lines
1 September	Bolton Castle	Cargo ship	Sir James Laing & Sons Ltd	Sunderland	United Kingdom	For Lancashire Shipping Co. Ltd.
1 September	Prittlewell	Dredger	Lobnitz & Co. Ltd.	Renfrew	United Kingdom	For Borough of Southend-on-Sea.
2 September	Lady Lilian	Trawler	Cook, Welton & Gemmell Ltd.	Beverley	United Kingdom	For Jutland Amalgamated Trawlers Ltd.
7 September	Tor	Sleipner-class destroyer	Fredrikstad Mekaniske Verksted	Fredrikstad	Norway	For Royal Norwegian Navy
8 September	Olza	freighter/dry cargo ship	Gdynia Shipyard	Gdynia	Poland	Launched prematurely due to World War II
12 September	Broompark	Cargo ship	Lithgows Ltd.	Port Glasgow	United Kingdom	For Denholm Line Steamers Ltd.
14 September	Argyll	Cargo ship	J. L. Thompson & Sons Ltd.	Sunderland	United Kingdom	For B. J. Sutherland & Co. Ltd.
14 September	Cormead	Collier	Burntisland Shipbuilding Company	Burntisland	United Kingdom	For Cory Colliers Ltd.
14 September	La Estancia	Cargo ship	William Doxford & Sons Ltd.	Pallion	United Kingdom	For Buries, Markes Ltd.
14 September	Polarsol	Tanker	Barclay, Curle & Co. Ltd.	Glasgow	United Kingdom	For Melsom & Melsom.
14 September	Richard Lee Barber	Tug	Fellows & Co. Ltd.	Southtown	United Kingdom	For Great Yarmouth Pot & Haven Commissioners.
18 September	Delphinula	Tanker	Lithgows Ltd.	Port Glasgow	United Kingdom	For Anglo-Saxon Petroleum Co. Ltd.
26 September	Rauma	Otra-class minesweeper	Nylands Verksted	Oslo	Norway	For Royal Norwegian Navy
27 September	Magician	C-type coaster	Ailsa Shipbuilding Co Ltd.	Troon	United Kingdom	Requisitioned by the British Army, converted to a hospital ship.
27 September	Supremity	Coastal tanker	G. Brown & Co (Marine) Ltd.	Greenock	United Kingdom	For F. T. Everard & Sons Ltd.
29 September	Beignon	Cargo ship	William Doxford & Sons Ltd.	Pallion	United Kingdom	For Nolisement Steamship Co. Ltd.
30 September	Worthtown	Coaster	John Lewis & Sons Ltd.	Aberdeen	United Kingdom	For Williamstown Shipping Co. Ltd.
11 October	Pompeji	Cargo ship	Flensburger Schiffbau-Gesellschaft.	Flensburg	Germany	For Deutsche Levant Line.
12 October	Auchmacoy	Tug	Hall, Russell & Co. Ltd.	Aberdeen	United Kingdom	For Mitchell & Rae Ltd.
12 October	Lea Grange	C-type coaster	S. P. Austin & Sons Ltd.	Sunderland	United Kingdom	For Tanfield Steamship Co.
12 October	Rodsley	Cargo ship	William Doxford & Sons Ltd.	Pallion	United Kingdom	For Thomasson Steamship Co. Ltd.
12 October	Vasco	Cargo ship	William Gray & Co. Ltd.	West Hartlepool	United Kingdom	For Ellerman's Wilson Line Ltd.
14 October	Elmdene	Cargo ship	William Gray & Co. Ltd.	West Hartlepool	United Kingdom	For Elmdene Shipping Co. Ltd.
16 October	Edina	Cargo ship	Henry Robb Ltd.	Leith	United Kingdom	For Leith, Hull & Hamburg Steam Packet Co. Ltd.
17 October	The James Braidwood	Fireboat	J. Samuel White	Cowes	United Kingdom	For London Fire Brigade. Named for James Braidwood
19 October	Amatsukaze	Kagerō-class destroyer	Maizuru Naval Arsenal	Maizuru	Japan	For Imperial Japanese Navy
21 October	Barnehurst	Net-class boom defence vessel	Blyth Dry Docks & Shipbuilding Co. Ltd	Blyth, Northumberland	United Kingdom	For Royal Navy.
26 October	Desmoulea	Tanker	Lithgows Ltd.	Port Glasgow	United Kingdom	For Anglo-Saxon Petroleum Co. Ltd.
30 October	Scorton	Cargo ship	Short Brothers Ltd.	Sunderland	United Kingdom	For Carlton Steamship Co. Ltd.
4 November	Esso Trenton	Maritime Commission Type N tanker	Federal Shipbuilding and Dry Dock	Kearny, New Jersey	United States	For United States Navy
4 November	Saturnus		Nakskov Skibsværft	Nakskov	Denmark	For Ab Saturnus
7 November	Herbert Norkus	Gorch Fock-class sail training ship	Blohm & Voss	Hamburg	Germany	For Reichsmarine
9 November	Beechwood	Cargo ship	Sir James Laing & Sons Ltd	Sunderland	United Kingdom	For J. I. Jacobs & Co. Ltd.
9 November	Hopetarn	Cargo ship	Swan, Hunter & Wigham Richardson Ltd.	Newcastle upon Tyne	United Kingdom	For Clive Shipping Co. Ltd.
10 November	Inverness	Cargo ship	J. L. Thompson & Sons Ltd.	Sunderland	United Kingdom	For B. J. Sutherland & Co. Ltd.
10 November	Tokitsukaze	Kagerō-class destroyer	Uraga Dock Company	Uraga	Japan	For Imperial Japanese Navy
11 November	Dan-Y-Bryn	Cargo ship	Burntisland Shipbuilding Company	Burntisland	United Kingdom	For Ambrose, Davies & Matthews Ltd.
11 November	Ruckinge	Cargo ship	William Gray & Co. Ltd.	West Hartlepool	United Kingdom	For Constants Ltd.
12 November	Ozarda	Cargo ship	Barclay, Curle & Co. Ltd.	Glasgow	United Kingdom	For British India Steam Navigation Company.
12 November	Mount Battock	Trawler	John Lewis & Sons Ltd.	Aberdeen	United Kingdom	For The Dodds Steam Fishing Co. Ltd.
15 November	Baron Scott	Cargo ship	Lithgows Ltd.	Port Glasgow	United Kingdom	For Kelvin Shipping Co. Ltd.
15 November	Impero	Littorio-class battleship	Gio. Ansaldo & C.	Genoa	Italy	For Regia Marina
25 November	Barnestone	Bar-class boom defence vessel	Blyth Dry Docks & Shipbuilding Co. Ltd	Blyth, Northumberland	United Kingdom	For Royal Navy.
27 November	Harpagus	Cargo ship	Bartram & Sons Ltd	Sunderland	United Kingdom	For J & C. Harrison Ltd.
27 November	Temple Arch	Cargo ship	Lithgows Ltd.	Port Glasgow	United Kingdom	For Temple Steamship Co.
28 November	Baccalieu'	Ferry	Fleming & Furguson Ltd.	Paisley	United Kingdom	For Government of Newfoundland.
28 November	Indis	Cargo ship	Charles Connell & Co Ltd	Glasgow	United Kingdom	For J. Nourse Ltd.
28 November	La Cordillera	Cargo ship	William Doxford & Sons Ltd.	Pallion	United Kingdom	For Buries, Markes Ltd.
27 November	Royal Emblem	Cargo ship	J. L. Thompson & Sons Ltd.	Sunderland	United Kingdom	For Hall Bros. Steamship Co. Ltd.
30 November	Lanarkshire	Cargo ship	Greenock Dockyard Co. Ltd.	Greenock	United Kingdom	For Scottish Shire Line Ltd.
November	Dolabella	Tanker	R. & W. Hawthorn, Leslie and Co. Ltd.	Newcastle on Tyne	United Kingdom	For Anglo-Saxon Petroleum Co. Ltd.
November	Glengarry	Cargo ship	Burmeister & Wain	Copenhagen	Denmark	For Glen Line.
9 December	Daydawn	Cargo ship	William Pickersgill & Co. Ltd.	Southwick	United Kingdom	For Claymore Shipping Co. Ltd.
10 December	Afghanistan	Cargo ship	John Readhead & Sons Ltd.	South Shields	United Kingdom	For Strick Line.
12 December	Atherstone	Hunt-class destroyer	Cammel Laird	Birkenhead	United Kingdom	For Royal Navy
12 December	Baghdad'	Dredger	William Simons & Co. Ltd.	Greenock	United Kingdom	For Government of Iraq.
12 December	Bois Rose	Steam trawler	Hall, Russell & Co. Ltd.	Aberdeen	United Kingdom	For Société Anonyme Les Pêcheries de Fécamp.
12 December	Elm	Tree-class trawler	Harland & Wolff	Belfast	United Kingdom	For Royal Navy.
12 December	Hambledon	Hunt-class destroyer	Swan Hunter	Wallsend	United Kingdom	For Royal Navy
13 December	MSC Mallard	Tug	Henry Robb Ltd.	Leith	United Kingdom	For Manchester Ship Canal Company.
13 December	Marsdale	Cargo ship	Lithgows Ltd.	Port Glasgow	United Kingdom	For "K" Steamship Co.
14 December	Alacrity	Coaster	Goole Shipbuilding & Repairing Co. Ltd.	Goole	United Kingdom	For F. T. Everard & Sons Ltd.
14 December	Invicta	Passenger Ferry	William Denny & Bros Ltd	Dumbarton	United Kingdom	For Southern Railway
14 December	Mormacland	Cargo ship	Sun Shipbuilding	Chester, Pennsylvania	United States	Transferred to the Royal Navy for conversion to HMS Archer
14 December	St. Apollo	Trawler	Cook, Welton & Gemmell Ltd.	Beverley	United Kingdom	For T. Hamling & Co. Ltd.
23 December	Norman Prince	Cargo ship	Smith's Dock Co. Ltd.	Middlesbrough	United Kingdom	For Prince Line Ltd.
26 December	Baron Herries	Cargo ship	Lithgows Ltd.	Port Glasgow	United Kingdom	For Kelvin Shipping Co. Ltd.
26 December	Legion	L-class destroyer	Hawthorn Leslie	Newcastle	United Kingdom	For Royal Navy
27 December	Charlbury	Cargo ship	Burntisland Shipbuilding Company	Burntisland	United Kingdom	For Alexander Shipping Co. Ltd.
27 December	Glenartney	Cargo ship	Caledon Shipbuilding & Engineering Co. Ltd.	Dundee	United Kingdom	For Blue Funnel Line.
27 December	Temple Inn	Cargo ship	Lithgows Ltd.	Port Glasgow	United Kingdom	For Temple Steamship Co Ltd.
28 December	Eglinton	Hunt-class destroyer	Vickers-Armstrongs	River Tyne	United Kingdom	For Royal Navy
Unknown date	A.G.T. No. 46	Tank barge	Alabama Drydock and Shipbuilding Company	Mobile, Alabama	United States	For A. G. Thomas.
Unknown date	Attentif	tug		Bordeaux	France	For French Navy.
Unknown date	Bukarest	Cargo ship	Deutsche Werft	Hamburg	Germany	For Deutsche Levant Line
Unknown date	C-105	Tank barge	Alabama Drydock and Shipbuilding Company	Mobile, Alabama	United States	For private owner.
Unknown date	Caribe I	Cargo ship	Van Diepen Scheepswerf Gebroeders NV	Waterhuizen	Netherlands	For S G Hallstrom, Amsterdam
Unknown date	Champion	tug		Bordeaux	France	For French Navy.
Unknown date	Comola No. 1	Tank barge	Alabama Drydock and Shipbuilding Company	Mobile, Alabama	United States	For Commercial Molasses Corp.
Unknown date	Comola No. 2	Tank barge	Alabama Drydock and Shipbuilding Company	Mobile, Alabama	United States	For Commercial Molasses Corp.
Unknown date	Cressida	Cargo ship	Lübecker Maschinenbau - Gesellschaft	Lübeck	Germany	
Unknown date	Dalbeck	Cargo ship	Lübecker Flenderwerke AG.	Lübeck	Germany	For Knohr & Burcharc.
Unknown date	Degei	Ferry	Harland & Wolff	Belfast	United Kingdom	For Government of Fiji.
Unknown date	Glenorchy	Cargo ship	Taikoo Dockyard & Engineering Company of Hong Kong Ltd	Hong Kong	Hong Kong	For Blue Funnel Line, or Glen Line.
Unknown date	Gunther Harmann	Coaster	Nobiskrug Werft	Rendsburg	Germany	
Unknown date	Hermelin	Cargo ship	Hong Kong & Whampoa Dock Co. Ltd.	Hong Kong	Hong Kong	For Bruusgaard Kiosterud & Co.
Unknown date	Karuah	Cargo ship	Hong Kong & Whampoa Dock Co. Ltd.	Hong Kong	Hong Kong	For Newcastle & Hunter River Steamship Company.
Unknown date	Klaus Wilhelm	Coaster	Schulte & Bruns	Embden	Germany	For Schulte & Bruns
Unknown date	Levante	Cargo ship	Nordseewerke.	Emden	Germany	For Deutsche Levante Line.
Unknown date	Linz	cargo ship	Danziger Werft.	Danzig	(Free City of Danzig) Danzig	For Norddeutscher Lloyd.
Unknown date	M-31	Tank barge	Alabama Drydock and Shipbuilding Company	Mobile, Alabama	United States	For Arundel Corp.
Unknown date	Martand	Cargo ship	William Hamilton & Co. Ltd.	Port Glasgow	United Kingdom	For Brocklebank Line.
Unknown date	Nightingale	Type C2 ship	Newport News Shipbuilding & Dry Dock Co	Newport News, Virginia	United States	For Grace Line Inc.
Unknown date	Oderbank	Coastal tanker	F Schichau GmbH	Danzig	(Free City of Danzig) Danzig	For Kriegsmarine.
Unknown date	Pallas	Cargo ship	Scheepswerft Delfzijl v/h Sander	Delfzijl	Netherlands	For N. Engelsman.
Unknown date	Panther	Cargo ship	Deutsche Werft.	Hamburg	Germany	For Laeisz Line.
Unknown date	Revue	Salvage tug	Cochrane & Son Ltd.	Selby	United Kingdom	For Beira Works Ltd.
Unknown date	S. A. Everard	Tug	Fellows & Co. Ltd.	Southtown	United Kingdom	For F. T. Everard & Sons Ltd.
Unknown date	Sherman No. 701	Tank barge	Alabama Drydock and Shipbuilding Company	Mobile, Alabama	United States	For Sherman & Sons.
Unknown date	Sherman No. 702	Tank barge	Alabama Drydock and Shipbuilding Company	Mobile, Alabama	United States	For Sherman & Sons.
Unknown date	Sherman No. 703	Barge	Alabama Drydock and Shipbuilding Company	Mobile, Alabama	United States	For Sherman & Sons.
Unknown date	Sherman No. 704	Barge	Alabama Drydock and Shipbuilding Company	Mobile, Alabama	United States	For Sherman & Sons.
Unknown date	Silvertown	Tug	Cochrane & Son Ltd.	Selby	United Kingdom	For Silvertown Services Ltd.
Unknown date	Sundowner	Sailing ship	J. Bolson & Son Ltd.	Poole	United Kingdom	For private owner.
Unknown date	Trave	Cargo ship	D W Kremer Sohn	Elmshorn	Germany	For Lübeck-Wyberger Dampfschiff Gesellschaft
Unknown date	Unitas 10	Whaler	Bremer Vulkan	Bremen	Germany	For Jurgens Van Den Brugh Margarine Verkaufs Union GmbH, Hamburg.
Unknown date	Venus	Cargo ship	Gebroeders Bodewes Volharding	Foxhol	Netherlands	
Unknown date	Viti	Cargo ship	Taikoo Dockyard & Engineering Company of Hong Kong Ltd.	Hong Kong	Hong Kong	For Government of Fiji.
Unknown date	Wiking 6	Whaler	DeSchiMAG	Bremen	Germany	For Hamburger Walfang-Kontor GmbH.
Unknown date	Wiking 8	Whaler	DeSchiMAG	Bremen	Germany	For Hamburger Walfang-Kontor GmbH.
Unknown date	Wiking 9	Whaler	DeSchiMAG	Bremen	Germany	For Hamburger Walfang-Kontor GmbH.
Unknown date	Wiking 10	Whaler	DeSchiMAG	Bremen	Germany	For Hamburger Walfang-Kontor GmbH.
Unknown date	No. 14	Tank barge	Alabama Drydock and Shipbuilding Company	Mobile, Alabama	United States	For Standard Oil Co.
Unknown date	Unnamed	Tank barge	Alabama Drydock and Shipbuilding Company	Mobile, Alabama	United States	For Alabama Drydock and Shipbuilding Company.
Unknown date	Unnamed	Tank barge	Alabama Drydock and Shipbuilding Company	Mobile, Alabama	United States	For private owber.
