= Toreador =

Toreador may refer to:

- Torero or bullfighter
- The Toreador, a musical comedy
- The "Toreador Song" from Georges Bizet's opera Carmen
- The Daily Toreador, the student newspaper of Texas Tech University
- The Hallucinogenic Toreador is the name of a Salvador Dalí painting
- "Toreador I" and "Toreador II", songs made by Apocalyptica
- "Toreador", a song by Band of Skulls on their 2014 album Himalayan
- The mascot for Boone High School in Boone, Iowa, U.S.
- Toreador (World of Darkness), a fictional clan of vampires in Vampire: The Masquerade and Vampire: The Dark Ages
- The mascot for Monterey High School in Monterey, California, United States
- adiosToreador, the username for Tavros Nitram, a fictional character in the web comic Homestuck
- "El Toreador", a song by The Charlie Daniels Band on their 1980 album Full Moon
- "El Toreador", a song by Gil Evans on his 1964 album The Individualism of Gil Evans
- SS Toreador (1909), a German cargo ship in service 1909–16
