= SMS M42 =

History

German Empire
- Name: SMS M42
- Builder: Bremer Vulkan
- Yard number: 604
- Launched: 11 August 1916
- Commissioned: 22 September 1916
- Fate: Stricken 17 March 1920

Germany
- Name: Nymphe
- Owner: Norddeutscher Lloyd
- Port of registry: Germany
- In service: 1922–1923

France
- Name: La Nymphe
- In service: 1923–1939

France
- Name: La Nymphe
- In service: 1939–1940
- Identification: Pennant number AD.204

Nazi Germany
- Name: Nymphe
- In service: 1944–1945
- Fate: Sunk April 1945

General characteristics
- Class & type: M1915 type minesweeper
- Displacement: 480 t (470 long tons) deep load
- Length: 58.41 m (191 ft 8 in) o/a
- Beam: 7.30 m (23 ft 11 in)
- Draught: 2.25 m (7 ft 5 in)
- Propulsion: 2 shaft reciprocating steam engines, 2 coal-fired boilers, 1,800 ihp (1,342 kW)
- Speed: 16.5 knots (30.6 km/h; 19.0 mph)
- Range: 2,000 nmi (3,700 km; 2,300 mi) at 14 kn (16 mph; 26 km/h)
- Complement: 40
- Armament: 2 × 10.5 cm (4.1 in) SK L/45 naval guns; 30 naval mines

SMS M42 (Note: "SMS" stands for "Seiner Majestät Schiff" (German: His Majesty's Ship)) was a M1915 type minesweeper built for the Imperial German Navy during the First World War by the Bremer Vulkan shipyard. She was launched on 11 August 1916 and completed on 22 September that year. M42 survived the remainder of the war, and was sold into commercial service in 1922, serving under the German and French under the names Nymphe and La Nymphe. The outbreak of the Second World War saw her requisitioned by the French Navy as an auxiliary minesweeper, but she was paid off in September 1940. In April 1944, the ship was taken over by the German Navy, serving as a training vessel and then a minelayer under the name Nymphe. The ship was sunk in April 1945.

== Design and construction ==
The M1915 Type were fleet minesweepers, seaworthy enough to operate in the open sea, and proved to be successful and reliable in service. 30 were built, which were completed during 1916, which followed on from 26 M1914 Type minesweepers, completed during 1915.

M42 was 58.41 m (191 ft 8 in) long overall, and 56.10 m (184 ft 1 in) at the waterline, with a beam of 7.30 m (23 ft 11 in) and a draught of 2.25 m (7 ft 5 in). The ship had a design displacement of 480 t (470 long tons) and a deep load displacement of 507 t (499 long tons). Two coal-fired water-tube boilers fed steam to two sets of 3-cylinder triple expansion steam engines, rated at 1,800 ihp (1,300 kW), which in turn drove two propeller shafts. Speed was 16.5 kn (19.0 mph; 30.6 km/h). 115 tons of coal was carried, sufficient for a range of 2,000 nmi (2,300 mi; 3,700 km) at 14 kn (16 mph; 26 km/h).

M42 had a main gun armament of two 10.5 cm (4.1 in) SK L/45 naval guns, with 210 rounds per gun carried, while 30 mines could be carried if the ship was used for minelaying. The ship had a crew of 40.

M42 was laid down at Bremer Vulkan shipyard as Yard number 604, and was launched on 11 August 1916, completing on 22 September that year.

== Service ==
At the end of 1917, M42 was part of the 2nd half-flotilla of the 1st Minesweeping Flotilla, and remained part of the 2nd half-flotilla of the 1st Minesweeping Flotilla at the end of April 1918. On 13 October 1918, M42 was carrying out minesweeping operations in the German Bight when she struck a mine. Four men, including the ship's commanding officer, were killed and 9 more wounded, but the ship remained afloat and was brought into Bremerhaven. The ship was still part of the 2nd half-flotilla of the 1st Minesweeping Flotilla, based at Cuxhaven at the end of the war.

M42 was stricken from the German Navy lists on 17 March 1920, and on 11 August 1920 was sold for 2.3 Million Marks to a Berlin company. By 1922, the ship was in use as a steam ferry owned by the shipping line Norddeutscher Lloyd with the name Nymphe. The ship had a Gross register tonnage of 385 and a Net register tonnage of 134. By 1923, the ship was sold to Camille Blanc of Nice, France, and renamed La Nymphe. In 1925, the ship, while still registered at Nice, was owned by the Viscount Le Gualès de Mezaubran. By 1933, the ship was listed as owned by the Société Anonyme des Bains de Mer et du Cercle des Etrangers de Monaco, although still registered under the French flag at Nice. La Nymphe's Gross register tonnage had now increased to 452. By 1936, La Nymphe's port of registry had moved to Monaco.

The outbreak of the Second World War saw La Nymphe requisitioned by the French Navy as an auxiliary minesweeper, with the Pennant number AD.204. The ship was paid off at Toulon in September 1940.

In April 1944, the ship was taken over by the German Navy for use as a training ship for submarine chasers, returning to the name Nymphe, but in May that year, became a minelayer. Nymphe was sunk in April 1945.

== Bibliography ==
- Gardiner, Robert; Gray, Randal, eds. (1985). Conway's All The World's Fighting Ships 1906–1921. London: Conway Maritime Press. ISBN 0-85177-245-5.
- Gladisch, Walter, ed. (1965). Der Krieg in der Nordsee: Band 7: Vom Sommer 1917 bis zum Kriegsende 1918. Der Krieg zur See: 1914–1918 (in German). Frankfurt: Verlag E.S. Mittler & Sohn.
- Gröner, Erich; Jung, Dieter; Maass, Martin (1983). Die deutschen Kriegsschiffe 1815–1945: Band 2: Torpedoboote, Zerstörer, Schnellboote, Minensuchboote, Minenräumboote (in German). Vol. II. Koblenz: Bernard & Graef Verlag. ISBN 3-7637-4801-6.
- Le Masson, Henri (1969). The French Navy: Volume Two. Navies of the Second World War. London: Macdonald & Co. (Publishers) Ltd. ISBN 0-356-02385-0.
- Lenton, H. T. (1975). German Warships of the Second World War. London: Macdonald and Jane's. ISBN 0-356-04661-3.
- Lloyds Register of Shipping: Volume II.–Steamers. London: Lloyd's Register of Shipping. 1922 – via Internet Archive.
- Lloyds Register of Shipping: Volume II.–Steamers and Motor Vessels. London: Lloyd's Register of Shipping. 1923 – via Internet Archive.
- Lloyds Register of Shipping: Volume II.–Steamers and Motor Vessels. London: Lloyd's Register of Shipping. 1925 – via Internet Archive.
- Lloyds Register of Shipping: Volume II.–Steamers and Motor Vessels. London: Lloyd's Register of Shipping. 1933 – via Internet Archive.
- Lloyds Register of Shipping: Volume II.–Steamers and Motor Vessels. London: Lloyd's Register of Shipping. 1936 – via Internet Archive.
- Stoelzel, Albert (1930). Ehrenrangliste der Kaiserlich Deutschen Marine 1914–1918 (in German). Berlin: Thormann & Goetsch.
