= Sperrbrecher =

German auxiliary minesweeping ships

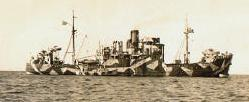
- Sperrbrecher 131

Class overview
- Operators: Kriegsmarine

General characteristics
- Class & type: Sperrbrecher 32
- Type: Minesweeper
- Displacement: 7,500 tonnes (8,300 short tons)
- Length: 115.1 m (378 ft)
- Beam: 15.3 m (50 ft)
- Draught: 6.5 m (21 ft)
- Propulsion: One diesel engine, one shaft, 3,500 shp (2,600 kW)
- Speed: 14 knots (26 km/h)
- Armament: 2 × 105 mm (4.1 in) AA; 2 × 3.7 cm (1.5 in) SK C/30 AA; 15 × 2 cm (0.79 in) C/30 AA
- Notes: Representative type of converted ships.

A Sperrbrecher (German; informally translated as "pathfinder" but literally meaning "mine barrage breaker") was a German auxiliary ship of the First World War and the Second World War that served as a type of minesweeper, steaming ahead of other vessels through minefields and detonating them with its reinforced hull. Also used as anti-aircraft ships, the Sperrbrecher suffered heavy losses in the war.

== Background ==
The advent of the naval mine in the late 19th century created a new hazard for shipping in time of war. The flexibility and cost-effectiveness of mines made them attractive to belligerents as both a defensive and an offensive measure. The cost of producing and laying a minefield was far less than the cost of clearing it, and it can take up to 200 times as long to clear a minefield as to lay it. Furthermore, offensive mine fields laid in an enemies harbours or trade routes can paralyze traffic until they are cleared, even if few ships are sunk or damaged, while moving valuable ships can involve a major sweeping operation ahead of its movement. Part of this effort is identifying where the mines are, which is sometimes only revealed when a ship runs into one.

During the First World War the Germans hit on a new approach; left with a surfeit of idle ships due to the Allied blockade, the Imperial German Navy introduced a ship known as Sperrbrecher ("block breaker"). Typically an old cargo ship, loaded with cargo that made her less vulnerable to sinking (wood for example), the Sperrbrecher was run ahead of the ship to be protected, revealing the existence of any mines by detonating one. The use of the Sperrbrecher obviated the need to continuous and painstaking sweeping, but the cost was high.

== Operational history ==
Sperrbrecher were used extensively by the Germans in World War I. The Imperial Fleet had a total of thirty Sperrbrecher for clearing pathways through minefields – eight were lost during the war. Some of these ships were equipped with aeroplanes, such as Rio Negro, Plauen or Wigbert. In World War II officially designated as 'Special Purpose Merchant Ships', although termed by the Royal Air Force as "Heavy Flak Ship", the Sperrbrecher were converted from merchant ships for their special role, were primarily crewed by merchant seamen. Often their cargo holds were filled with buoyant material to aid in flotation in case of hitting a mine and the bows were strengthened. Ships converted to the Sperrbrecher type were usually fitted with heavy anti-aircraft armament and often carried barrage balloons.

The primary use of the Sperrbrecher was to escort other vessels through cleared paths in defensive minefields, for the purpose of detonating any mines that might have strayed into the passageways. The ships of the Sperrbrecher type were, early in the war, used to clear suspected enemy minefields by simply sailing through them. Even with the strengthened hull and buoyant material the ships suffered heavy losses and with the advent of acoustically and magnetically fused mines, they became ineffective. Later in the war the Sperrbrecher type ships were used to escort U-boats in and out of harbour.

Due to their capable dual purpose armament and respectable fire control a Sperrbrecher was also an able surface combatant, significant enough to deter the WWI-era RN escort destroyer HMS Wanderer from engaging for fear of receiving "a bloody nose".

To counter newer, magnetically fused mines, some ships of the Sperrbrecher type were equipped with a large electromagnet in their bows. Referred to as the VES system, this was to detonate magnetic mines well clear of the vessel, the design specifications calling for a distance of 460 metres (500 yd) from the hull at detonation. Careful military intelligence work by the Royal Navy resulted in a method to defeat this method of minesweeping, sinking several Sperrbrecher through the careful fusing of mines laid as traps, their fuses desensitised to be activated only when the sweeping vessel was directly above them.

Over one hundred vessels, mostly merchant ships of around 5,000 tonnes (5,500 short tons) and larger displacement, were converted as Sperrbrecher and it is estimated that around 50 percent of the vessels converted were lost during the war.

During World War II only one commander received the Knight's Cross of the Iron Cross for services on a Sperrbrecher. Korvettenkapitän of the Reserves Karl Palmgreen received the award on 3 August 1941 as commander of Sperrbrecher IX and I. After the war some Sperrbrecher were converted back to merchant duties, a number remaining in service until the 1970s.

== Selected Sperrbrecher ==
Individual ships which have articles on Wikipedia:

- Sperrbrecher 18
- Sperrbrecher 31 / Sperrbrecher 131
- Sperrbrecher 32 / Sperrbrecher 132
- Sperrbrecher 33
- Sperrbrecher 34 / Sperrbrecher 134
- Sperrbrecher 36 / Sperrbrecher 136
- Sperrbrecher 38 / Sperrbrecher 133
- Sperrbrecher 39 / Sperrbrecher 139
- Sperrbrecher 137
- Sperrbrecher 138

== See also ==
- R boat, for smaller German minesweepers
- M-class minesweeper (Germany) for larger German World War 2 minesweepers
