= SS Teutonia =

A number of steamships were named Teutonia, including -

- SS Teutonia (1856) - in service with Hamburg Brazilianische Packetschiffahrt Gesellschaft (1856-58), Hamburg Amerika Line 1858-77, Dominion Steamship Co 1877-78 and Mississippi and Dominion Steamship Co 1878-82, 1884.
- SS Teutonia (1878) - in service with the Hamburg Amerika Line 1878-1901
- SS Teutonia (1881) - in service with the African Steamship Company 1881-90
- SS Teutonia (1889) - in service with the Hamburg Amerila Line 1899-1905
- SS Teutonia (1892) - in service with the Batavia Line 1892-1917
- SS Teutonia (1906) - in service with HAPAG 1922-33
- FV Teutonia - A steam fishing trawler in service 1937–39, served as an auxiliay minesweeper and vorpostenboot during the Second World War
