= Derfflinger =

Derfflinger may refer to:

In warships:

- Derfflinger-class battlecruiser
  - SMS Derfflinger, a battlecruiser of the Imperial German Navy, launched in 1913
- V 620 Derfflinger, a vorpostenboot in service 1943-45

== People with the surname ==
- Georg von Derfflinger (1606–1695), Austrian nobleman, field marshal in the army of Brandenburg

== See also ==
- Category:Derfflinger-class battlecruisers
- 3rd Grenadier zu Pferde (cavalry) regiment (Neumärkisches) of the 4. Kav. Brigade, a unit of the Prussian army in the 3rd Division, with the honorary name of "Freiherr von Derfflinger"
