= SS Reiher (1909) =

975 GRT cargo ship

History
- Name: Reiher (1909–38); Flamingo (1938–39); V 109 Flamingo (1939–40); Sperrbrecher 39 (1940–41); Sperrbrecher 139 (1941–44)
- Owner: Argo Line (1909–23); Dampfschifffahrtsgesellschaft Argo mbH (1923–25/26); Norddeutscher Lloyd (1925/26–33); Argo Reederei AG (1933–37); Argo Reederei Richard Adler & Co (1937–39); Kriegsmarine (1939–44)
- Port of registry: (German Empire) Bremen, Germany (1909–19); (Weimar Republic) Bremen, Germany (1919–33); (Nazi Germany) Bremen, Germany (1933–39); Kriegsmarine (1939–44)
- Builder: Bremer Vulkan AG
- Yard number: 531
- Launched: 1909
- Commissioned: 1 October 1940
- Out of service: 18 February 1945
- Identification: Code Letters QJSC (1909–34); Code Letters DOAU (1934–44); Pennant Number V 109 (1939–40)
- Fate: Struck a mine and sank 18 February 1945

General characteristics
- Tonnage: 975 GRT402 NRT, 1,035 DWT
- Length: 67.21 m (220 ft 6 in)
- Beam: 9.86 m (32 ft 4 in)
- Depth: 4.11 m (13 ft 6 in)
- Installed power: Triple expansion steam engine, 179nhp
- Propulsion: Single screw propeller
- Speed: 11 knots (20 km/h)

Reiher was a 975 GRT cargo ship that was built in 1909 by Bremer Vulkan, Bremen, Germany for Argo Line. She was renamed Flamingo in 1938 and was requisitioned by the Kriegsmarine in 1939, serving as the vorpostenboot V-109 Flamingo and the sperrbrecher Sperrbrecher 39 and Sperrbrecher 139. She struck a mine and sank off the coast on Norway in February 1945.

== Description ==
The ship was 67.21 metres (220 ft 6 in) long, with a beam of 9.86 metres (32 ft 4 in) and a depth of 4.11 metres (13 ft 6 in). She was assessed at 975 GRT, 402 NRT, 1,035 DWT. She was powered by a triple expansion steam engine, which had cylinders of 54 centimetres (21 1/4 in), 87.5 centimetres (34 7/16 in) and 138 centimetres (54 1/2 in) diameter by 90.0 centimetres (35 7/16 in) stroke. The engine was built by Bremer Vulkan, Bremen. It was rated at 179nhp and drove a single screw propeller. It could propel her at 11 knots (20 km/h).

== History ==
Reiher was built in 1909 as Yard Number 531 by Bremer Vulkan, Bremen for Argo Line, Bremen. Her port of registry was Bremen and the Code Letters QJSC were allocated. In 1923, Argo Line merged with the Roland Line to form Dampfschifffahrtsgesellschaft Argo mbH. In December 1924, her captain was fined £10 with 10gns costs at the Thames Police Court, London for an offence under the Merchant Shipping Act 1906, having had an excessive deck cargo of mahogany logs which were improperly stored. Around 1925/26, Dampfschifffahrtsgesellschaft Argo mbH was absorbed by Norddeutscher Lloyd. Reiher was transferred to Argo Reederei AG in 1933.

On 14 April 1928, Soviet gold valued at £1,043,000 was transferred from the Norddeutscher Lloyd ocean liner Dresden to Reiher at a position 12 nautical miles (22 km) off Falmouth, Cornwall, United Kingdom. The transfer was to prevent the gold being seized by the French when Dresden docked at Cherbourg, Manche. Reiher sailed to Bremerhaven with the gold, arriving the next day. In 1934, her Code Letters were changed to DOAU. She was transferred to Argo Reederei Richard Adler in 1937 and was renamed Flamingo in 1938.

On 1 November 1940, Flamingo was requisitioned by the Kriegsmarine for use as a vorpostenboot, serving with 1 Vorpostenbootflottille as V 109 Flamingo. On 26 June 1940, she was transferred to 3 Sperrbrecherflottille serving as Sperrbrecher 39, and from 1941 as Sperrbrecher 139. On 17 February 1945, she struck a mine off Lindesnes, Norway. She sank the next day 1 nautical mile (1.9 km) south west of the Lindesnes Lighthouse (57°58′N 7°02′E.
