= M-class minesweeper (Germany) =

Class of naval warship of Nazi Germany

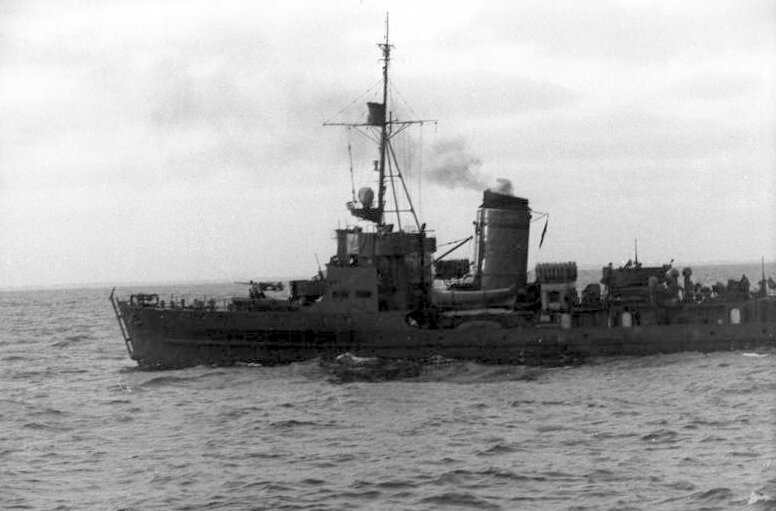
- M1940 series minesweeper in 1941

Class overview
- Name: M class
- Operators: Kriegsmarine; Post-war: Romanian Naval Forces; United States Navy; Royal Navy; Soviet Navy; Royal Norwegian Navy; French Navy; German Navy; Italian Navy
- Subclasses: M1915; M1916; M1935; M1940; M1943
- Built: 1937–1945 (not including older M1915 and M1916 ships)
- Completed: M1935 : 69; M1940 : 131; M1943 : 18
- Lost: M1935 : 35; M1940 : 63; M1943 : 1

General characteristics : M1935
- Displacement: 682 long tons (693 t) standard; 874 long tons (888 t) full load
- Length: 68.4 m (224 ft 5 in)
- Beam: 8.5 m (27 ft 11 in)
- Draught: 2.65 m (8 ft 8 in)
- Propulsion: 2 shaft VTE engines with exhaust turbines, 2 oil-fired boilers, 3,200 hp (2,386 kW)
- Speed: 18 knots (33 km/h; 21 mph)
- Complement: 113
- Armament: 2 × 10.5 cm (4.1 in) SK C/32 guns; 2 × 3.7 cm (1.5 in) SK C/30 guns; 2 × 2 cm (0.79 in) SK C/30 guns

General characteristics : M1940
- Displacement: 543 long tons (552 t) standard; 775 long tons (787 t) full load
- Length: 62.3 m (204 ft 5 in)
- Beam: 8.5 m (27 ft 11 in)
- Draught: 2.8 m (9 ft 2 in)
- Propulsion: 2 shaft VTE engines with exhaust turbines, 2 coal-fired boilers, 2,400 hp (1,790 kW)
- Speed: 16 knots (30 km/h; 18 mph)
- Complement: 80
- Armament: 1 × 105 mm (4.1 in) gun; 1 × 37 mm gun; 6–8 × 20 mm guns

General characteristics : M1943
- Displacement: 582 long tons (591 t) standard; 821 long tons (834 t) full load
- Length: 67.8 m (222 ft 5 in)
- Beam: 9 m (29 ft 6 in)
- Draught: 2.7 m (8 ft 10 in)
- Propulsion: 2 shaft VTE engines with exhaust turbines, 2 coal-fired boilers, 2,400 hp (1,790 kW)
- Speed: 16 knots (30 km/h; 18 mph)
- Complement: 107
- Armament: 2 × 105 mm (4.1 in) guns; 2 × 37 mm guns; 6–8 × 20 mm guns

The M class were the standard minesweeper (German: Minensuchboot) of Nazi Germany's Kriegsmarine during World War II. The vessels were the primary force in Germany's harbor defense command and were organized administratively into minesweeper flotillas.

== History ==
=== M1915 and M1916 ===
A total of 36 old units from World War I served in World War II. Some of these were converted to experimental ships, artillery school ships, fleet tenders or R-boat tenders, and 1 (ex-M109) was converted into a survey ship. In 1940, most of these converted vessels were re-designated as minesweepers again.

=== M1935 ===
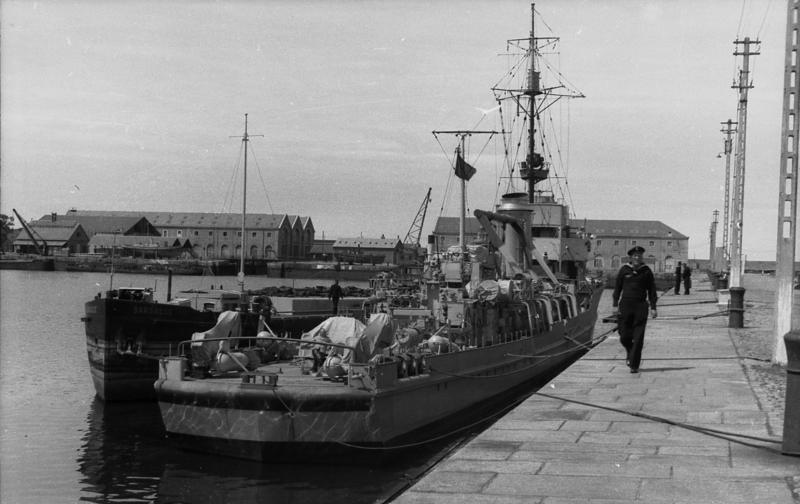
M1935 vessel in occupied France in 1941

The first series; the M1935 were ordered in the late 1930s to replace worn out World War I vintage boats. These ships proved versatile and seaworthy. The vessels could also undertake convoy escort, anti-submarine warfare and minelaying tasks as well as minesweeping. However, the ships were very expensive and complicated to build, and their oil-fired boilers meant they suffered from the fuel shortages in the later years of the war. A total of 69 ships were built in eight different shipyards, between 1937 and 1941. 34 were lost during the war.

=== M1940 ===
Although the M1935 was a very satisfactory vessel, it was complex and expensive to build and a simplified design was put into production in 1941. These ships had coal-fired boilers because of oil shortages. A total of 127 ships were built between 1941 and 1944, and 63 M1940 class ships were sunk during the war.

The M1940 ships had a standard displacement of 543 tons and a full load displacement of 775 tons. They measured 62.3 meters in length, with a beam of 8.5 meters and a draught of 2.3 meters. Armament consisted of one 105 mm guns plus one 37 mm and six to eight 20 mm anti-aircraft guns. They were powered by two coal-fired boilers driving a two-shaft triple-expansion engine, which generated an output of 2,400 hp resulting in a top speed of 17 knots and a range 1,043 nautical miles at that speed.

Four vessels of this type were launched for the Romanian Navy in 1943 as the Democrația class. They were built locally from German materials. These were structurally identical with the German boats but with a different armament.

=== M1943 ===
This was a further simplified and slightly enlarged version of the M1940. These ships were designed for pre-fabrication and were produced in four versions:

- Minesweeper
- Anti-submarine vessel with extra depth charges
- Torpedo boat, with two 533 mm (21 in) torpedo tubes
- Torpedo training vessel

Only 18 vessels were completed by the time the war ended.

=== Post-war ===
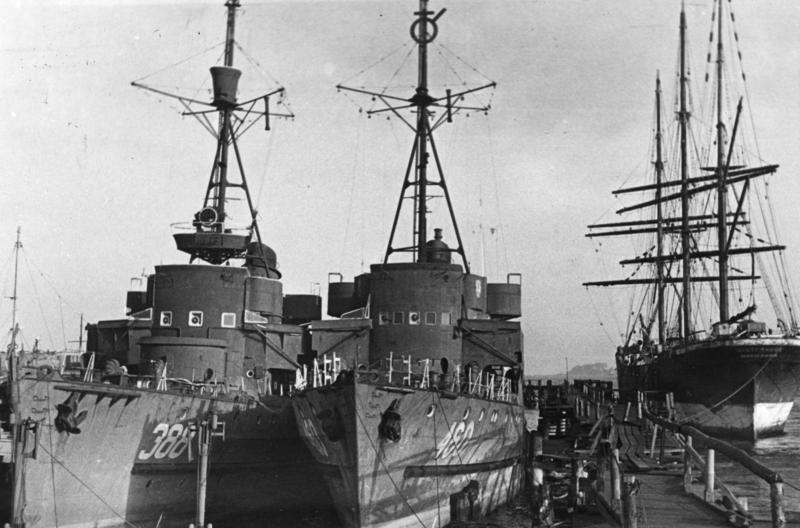
Demilitarized M1940s in 1949

After the end of the war the surviving ships were allocated to the United States, Britain and the Soviet Union. Many were assigned to the German Mine Sweeping Administration under British control to clear the coast of Northern Europe of mines. Several were later also given to France and Norway, and two to Italy.

Eleven of the ships were returned to Germany in 1956/57 and were recommissioned into the Bundesmarine.

Fourteen M1940-type minesweepers (known as the Guadiaro class) were built for the Spanish Navy in Spanish shipyards. Seven of them were modernised with some help from the US Navy and served in the Spanish Navy for more than thirty years.

== See also ==
- R boat, for smaller German minesweepers
- Sperrbrecher for another type of German World War 2 minesweeper
