= German trawler V 621 Mars =

German fishing trawler and vorpostenboot

History
- Name: Mars
- Owner: Dollart Heringfischerei (1937–39); Kriegsmarine (1939–44)
- Port of registry: (Nazi Germany) Emden, Germany (1939); Kriegsmarine (1939–44)
- Builder: Schulte & Bruns, Emden
- Yard number: 116
- Launched: 8 June 1937
- Completed: 7 August 1937
- Commissioned: 10 September 1939
- Out of service: 15 July 1944
- Identification: Fishing boat registration AE 81 (1937–39); Code Letters DGLF (1937-44); Pennant Number M 1402 (1939–42); Pennant Number M 4415 (1942–43); Pennant Number V 621 (1944)
- Fate: Burnt out in an air attack

General characteristics
- Type: Fishing trawler (1937–39); Minesweeper (1939–43); Vorpostenboot (1944)
- Tonnage: 268 GRT, 124 NRT
- Length: 35.84 m (117 ft 7 in)
- Beam: 7.49 metres (24 ft 7 in)
- Depth: 3.28 m (10 ft 9 in)
- Installed power: Diesel engine, 94nhp
- Propulsion: Single screw propeller
- Speed: 11 knots (20 km/h)

Mars was a German fishing trawler which was built in 1937. She was requisitioned by the Kriegsmarine during the Second World War. She was used as a minesweeper under the pennant numbers M 1402 and M 4413, and later as the Vorpostenboot V 621 Mars. She was lost in an Allied air attack in July 1944.

== Description ==
The ship was 35.84 m (117 ft 7 in) long, with a beam of 7.49 metres (24 ft 7 in). She had a depth of 3.28 m (10 ft 9 in). She was assessed at 268 GRT, 124 NRT. She was powered by a diesel engine, which had 8 cylinders of 28 centimetres (11 in) diameter by 44.9 centimetres (17 11/16 in) stroke. The engine was built by Klöckner-Humboldt-Deutz AG, Köln, Germany. It was rated at 94 nhp. It drove a single screw propeller. It could propel the ship at 11 knots (20 km/h).

== History ==
Mars was built as yard number 116 by Schulte & Bruns, Emden, Germany. She was launched on 8 June 1937 and completed on 7 August. She was owned by the Dollart Heringfischerei AG, Emden Her port of registry was Emden. She was allocated the Code Letters DGLF, and the fishing boat registration AE 91.

On 10 September 1939, Mars was requisitioned by the Kriegsmarine, serving with 14 Minensuchflotille as the minesweeper M 1402. On 12 April 1942, she was reallocated to 44 Minensuchflotille and her pennant number was changed to M 4413. On 1 January 1943, she was designated as a vorpostenboot. She was allocated to 6 Vorpostenflotille as V 621 Mars. On 15 July 1944, she was attacked off La Pallice, Charente-Inférieure, France by two Allied aircraft and set afire. She was beached on Belle Île, Morbihan, where she burnt out. Mars was a total loss. V 624 Köln was severely damaged in the attack.
