= German trawler V 107 Botilla Russ =

History
- Name: Botilla Russ (1922–40); Sperrbrecher 137 (1940–44)
- Owner: Ernst Russ (1922–39); Kriegsmarine (1939–44)
- Port of registry: (Weimar Republic) Hamburg, Germany (1922–35); (Nazi Germany) Hamburg, Germany (1935–39); Kriegsmarine (1939–44)
- Builder: Atlas Werke
- Yard number: 166
- Launched: August 1922
- Commissioned: 1 October 1939
- Out of service: 28 January 1944
- Identification: Code Letters RCQF (1922–34); Code Letters DHCY (1934–39); Pennant number V 107 (1939–40)
- Fate: Struck a mine and sank off the coast of France

General characteristics
- Class & type: Vorpostenboot (Converted cargo ship)
- Tonnage: 996 GRT, 586 NRT
- Length: 68.28 m (224 ft 0 in)
- Beam: 10.13 m (33 ft 3 in)
- Depth: 4.14 m (13 ft 7 in)
- Installed power: Triple expansion steam engine, 129 nhp
- Propulsion: 1 screw propeller
- Speed: 10 1/2 knots (19.4 km/h)

V 107 Botilla Russ was a German cargo ship which was converted into a Vorpostenboot and then a Sperrbrecher for the Kriegsmarine during World War II.

== Description ==
The ship was 68.28 metres (224 ft 0 in) long, with a beam of 10.13 metres (33 ft 3 in) and a depth of 4.14 metres (13 ft 7 in). She was assessed at 966 GRT, 586 NRT She was powered by a triple expansion steam engine which had cylinders of 45.9 centimetres (18 1/16 in), 75 centimetres (29 1/2 in) and 123 centimetres (48 1/2 in) diameter by 75 centimetres (29 1/2 in) stroke. The engine was built by Atlas Werke, Bremen. It was rated at 129nhp, and could propel her at 10 1/2 knots (19.4 km/h).

== History ==
Botilla Russ was built in 1922 by Atlas Werke for Ernst Russ, Hamburg, Germany. The Code Letters RCQF were allocated. In 1934, her Code Letters were changed to DHCY.

On 1 October 1939, Bottila Russs was requisitioned by the Kriegsmarine. She served with 1 Vorpostenflotille as V 107 Botilla Russ. On 22 June 1940, she was transferred to 3 Sperrbrecherflotille as Sperrbrecher 137. She struck a mine and sank off the coast of Finistère, France on 28 January 1944.
