= German trawler V 103 Sylvia =

German World War II auxiliary ship

History
- Name: Drau; Sylvia ( –1940); Sperrbrecher 33 (1940– )
- Port of registry: Germany ( –1940); Kriegsmarine (1940–1945 ); German Mine Sweeping Administration (1945– )
- Builder: Deutsche Schiff- und Maschinenbau
- Commissioned: 1 October 1939

General characteristics
- Class & type: Converted steamship
- Tonnage: 1,049 GRT

V 103 Sylvia, later called Sperrbrecher 33, was a German steamship which was converted into a Vorpostenboot for the Kriegsmarine during World War II. Following the war, it became a part of the German Mine Sweeping Administration.

== History ==
Drau was built in Bremen by Deutsche Schiff- und Maschinenbau. She was subsequently renamed Sylvia. On 1 October 1939, it was placed into the newly formed 1st Vorpostenflotille. The ship participated in the German invasion of Denmark in April 1940, escorting the steamer Rugard and tugs Monsun and Passat alongside V 102 Cressida and several minesweepers. The group landed three companies of the 170th Infantry Division at Middlefart.

Sylvia remained a part of the Vorpostenflotille until it was disbanded on 1 October 1940, transferring to the 3rd Sperrbrechtflotille as Sperrbrecher 33. After the end of World War II, Sperrbrecher 33 was transferred to the German Mine Sweeping Administration.
