= German trawler V 623 Jupiter =

German fishing trawler and vorpostenboot

History
- Name: Jupiter
- Owner: Dollart Heringfischerei (1936–39); Kriegsmarine (1939–44)
- Port of registry: (Nazi Germany) Emden, Germany (1939); Kriegsmarine (1939–44)
- Builder: Schulte & Bruns, Emden
- Yard number: 108
- Launched: 27 June 1936
- Completed: 28 July 1936
- Commissioned: 9 October 1939
- Out of service: 11 August 1944
- Identification: Fishing boat registration AE 79 (1937–39); Code Letters DGKF (1937-44); Pennant Number M 1404 (1939–42); Pennant Number M 4415 (1942–43); Pennant Number V 623 (1944)
- Fate: Scuttled

General characteristics
- Type: Fishing trawler (1936–39); Minesweeper (1939–43); Vorpostenboot (1944)
- Tonnage: 267 GRT, 126 NRT
- Length: 35.76 m (117 ft 4 in)
- Beam: 7.49 metres (24 ft 7 in)
- Depth: 3.28 m (10 ft 9 in)
- Installed power: Diesel engine, 98nhp
- Propulsion: Single screw propeller
- Speed: 11 knots (20 km/h)

Jupiter was a German fishing trawler which was built in 1936. She was requisitioned by the Kriegsmarine during the Second World War. She was used as a minesweeper under the pennant numbers M 1404 and M 4415, and later as the Vorpostenboot V 623 Jupiter. She was scuttled in 1944.

== Description ==
The ship was 35.76 m (117 ft 4 in) long, with a beam of 7.49 metres (24 ft 7 in). She had a depth of 3.28 m (10 ft 9 in). She was assessed at 267 GRT, 126 NRT. She was powered by a diesel engine, which had 8 cylinders of 28 centimetres (11 in) diameter by 44.9 centimetres (17 11/16 in) stroke. The engine was built by Klöckner-Humboldt-Deutz AG, Köln, Germany. It was rated at 98 nhp. It drove a single screw propeller. It could propel the ship at 11 knots (20 km/h).

== History ==
Almuth was built as yard number 108 by Schulte & Bruns, Emden, Germany. She was launched on 27 June 1936 and completed on 28 July. She was owned by the Dollart Heringfischerei AG, Emden. Her port of registry was Emden. She was allocated the Code Letters DGKF, and the fishing boat registration AE 79.

On 9 October 1939, Jupiter was requisitioned by the Kriegsmarine, serving with 14 Minensuchflotille as the minesweeper M 1404. On 22 March 1942, she was reallocated to 44 Minensuchflotille and her pennant number was changed to M 4415. On 1 January 1943, she was designated as a vorpostenboot. She was allocated to 6 Vorpostenflotille as V 623 Jupiter. On 11 August 1944, she was scuttled at Nantes, Loire-Inférieure, France, because she was unmanoeuverable.
