= SS Friedrich Karl =

German cargo ship (1938–1942)

History
- Name: Friedrich Karl
- Owner: Reederei Wendenhof GmbH (1938– ); Kriegsmarine ( –1942)
- Port of registry: (Nazi Germany) Wismar, Germany (1938– ); Kriegsmarine ( –1942)
- Builder: Neptun Werft
- Launched: 1938
- Identification: Code Letters DMXL
- Fate: Sunk 23 December 1942

General characteristics
- Tonnage: 1,262 GRT, 589 NRT
- Length: 72.01 m (236 ft 3 in)
- Beam: 10.80 metres (35 ft 5 in)
- Depth: 4.60 metres (15 ft 1 in)
- Installed power: Triple expansion steam engine, 167nhp
- Propulsion: Single screw propeller
- Speed: 10.5 knots (19.4 km/h)

Friedrich Karl was a cargo ship which was built by Neptun Werft, Rostock in 1938. She was requisitioned by the Kriegsmarine during the Second World War, serving as the vorpostenboot V 108 Friedrich Karl and the sperrbrecher Sperrbrecher 138. She struck a mine and sank off Borkum on 23 December 1942.

== Description ==
The ship was 72.01 metres (236 ft 3 in) long, with a beam of 10.80 metres (35 ft 5 in) and a depth of 4.60 metres (15 ft 1 in). She was assessed at 1,262 GRT, 589 NRT. She was powered by a triple expansion steam engine which had cylinders of 41 centimetres (16 1/8 in), 66 centimetres (26 in) and 112.6 centimetres (44 5/16 in) diameter by 70.0 centimetres (27 9/16 in) stroke. The engine was built by Neptun Werft, Rostock. It was rated at 167nhp and drove a single screw propeller. She had a speed of 10.5 knots (19.4 km/h).

== History ==
Friedrich Karl was built in 1938 by Neptun Werft, Rostock for Reederei Wendenhof GmbH, Wismar. The Code Letters DMXL were allocated. During the Second World War, she was requisitioned by the Kriegsmarine to serve as a Vorpostenboot. She was allocated to 1 Vorpostenbootflotille under the designation V108 Friedrich Karl. She was redesignated as a Sperrbrecher on 26 September 1941, becoming Sperrbrecher 138 with 1 Sperrbrecherflotille. On 23 December 1942, she struck a mine and sank off Borkum.
