= German trawler V 102 Cressida =

History
- Name: Cressida (1939–40); Sperrbrecher 32 (1940–45); Sperrbrecher 132 (1945); Cressida (1945–48); Elsenburgh (1947–61); Gernik (1961–62)
- Owner: A, Kirsten (1939); Kriegsmarine (1939–45); Wm H. Müller & Co., N.V. (1948–61); Seven Seas Shipping Corporation (1961–62)
- Operator: Owner operated until 1961; Niksa Sekulovich (1961–62)
- Port of registry: (Nazi Germany) Hamburg, Germany (1939); Kriegsmarine (1939–45); Germany (1945–48); Rotterdam, Netherlands (1948–61); Monrovia, Liberia (1960–61)
- Builder: Lübecker Maschinenbau – Gesellschaft
- Yard number: 380
- Launched: 1939
- Commissioned: 1 October 1939
- Decommissioned: 1947
- Identification: Code Letters DJZB (1939, 1945–47); Pennant Number V201 (1939–40); Code Letters PDXK (1948–61)
- Fate: Survived the war and returned to civilian service, sank off the coast of Greece on 23 December 1962

General characteristics
- Type: Converted Cargo ship
- Tonnage: 1,046 GRT, 477 NRT
- Length: 70.33 m (230 ft 9 in)
- Beam: 10.52 m (34 ft 6 in)
- Depth: 3.56 m (11 ft 8 in)
- Installed power: 1500 APK
- Propulsion: Compound steam engine (1939–57); 2-stroke Diesel engine (1957–62)
- Speed: 12 knots (22 km/h; 14 mph) (1957–62)

V 102 Cressida was a German cargo ship which was converted into a Vorpostenboot for the Kriegsmarine during World War II.

== Description ==
Cressida was 70.33 m (230 ft 9 in) long, with a beam of 10.52 m (34 ft 6 in) and a depth of 3.56 m (11 ft 8 in). The ship was powered by a 4-cylinder compound steam engine which had two cylinders of 36 centimetres (14 in) and two cylinders of 76.0 centimetres (29 15/16 in) diameter by 80 centimetres (31 1/2 in) stroke. The engine was built by Christiansen & Meyer, Harburg. It was rated at 160nhp. The ship was assessed at 1,046 GRT, 477 NRT.

== History ==
Cressida was a cargo vessel built in Lübeck in early 1939 as yard number 380 by the shipbuilder Lübecker Maschinenbau-Gesellschaft, for A Kirsten, Hamburg, which was its port of registry. The ship was allocated the Code Letters DJZB. On 1 October 1939, the ship was requisitioned by the Kriegsmarine as V 102 and was placed in the 1 Vorpostenflotille. The ship participated in the German invasion of Denmark in April 1940, escorting the steamer Rugard and tugs Monsun and Passat alongside V 103 Sylvia and several minesweepers. The group landed three companies of the 170th Infantry Division at Middlefart.

On 20 June 1940, the ship was converted into a Sperrbrecher, or a ship with a reinforced hull designed to clear a path through minefields. It was designated as Sperrbrecher 32 and was moved into the 3 Sperrbrecher-flotille, where it served for the duration of the war, being renamed Sperrbrecher 132 in 1945.

After the war, the ship was given into the control of The Netherlands and was officially transferred on 5 September 1947, delivered by the German tugboat Nestor to Amsterdam from Bremerhaven. The ship was renamed Elsenburgh. It was owned by Wm. H. Müller & Co. NV, Rotterdam. The Code Letters PDXK were allocated. In 1952, the ship was completely renovated by the Koniklijke Maatschappij te Velde, Vlissingen, Zeeland, receiving a new Sulzer diesel engine. The engine was a two-stroke single acting engine which had five cylinders of 48 centimetres (18 7/8 in) diameter by 70 centimetres (27 5/8 in) stroke. It was rated at 1,500 rhp and could propel the ship at 12 knots (22 km/h).

In November 1961, Elsenburgh was sold to the Seven Seas Shipping Corporation, Monrovia, Liberia and was renamed Gernik. It was operated under the management of Niksa Sekulovich, Lugarno, Switzerland. On 23 December 1962 while carrying cargo from Haifa, Gernik ran aground on Karpathos off the coast of Greece during a storm. While all of the crew made it safely ashore, the ship was declared a total loss.
