= German trawler V 104 Falke =

German World War II auxiliary ship

History
- Name: Toreador (1909–1916); Düsseldorf (1916–18); Poldorf (1918–1919); Düsseldorf (1919–1923); Falke (1923–1939); V 104 Falke (1939–1940); Sperrbrecher 34 (1940–1941); Sperrbrecher 134 (1941–1944)
- Owner: J. D. Stücken (1909–16); Argo Line (1916–18); British government (1918–19); Argo Line (1919–23); Dampfschifffahrtsgesellschaft Argo mbH (1923–25/26); Norddeutscher Lloyd (1925/26–33); Argo Reederei AG (1933–37); Argo Reederei Richard Adler AG (1937–39); Kriegsmarine (1939–44)
- Port of registry: (German Empire) Bremen, Germany (1909–1918); United Kingdom (1918–1919); (Weimar Republic) Bremen, Germany (1919–34); (Nazi Germany) Bremen, Germany (1934–1939); Kriegsmarine (1939–1944)
- Builder: Bremer Vulkan
- Yard number: 527
- Launched: 31 July 1909
- Commissioned: 1 October 1939
- Out of service: 8 August 1944
- Identification: United Kingdom Official Number 142674 (1918–19); Code Letters QJRM (1923–34); Code Letters DOBY (1934–44)
- Fate: Bombed and sunk off Lorient, France

General characteristics
- Class & type: Cargo ship; Vorpostenboot; Sperrbrecher
- Tonnage: 998 GRT, 480 NRT
- Length: 72.92 m (239 ft 3 in)
- Beam: 10.16 m (33 ft 4 in)
- Depth: 3.84 m (12 ft 7 in)
- Installed power: Triple expansion steam engine, 160nhp
- Propulsion: Single screw propeller
- Speed: 10 knots (19 km/h)

V 104 Falke was a German-built cargo ship which was converted into an auxiliary warship for the Kriegsmarine as a Vorpostenboot and then Sperrbrecher. The ship was built as Toreador and was also known as Poldorf and Düsseldorf.

== Description ==
The ship was built from steel. It had a length of 72.92 metres (239 ft 3 in), a beam of 10.16 metres (33 ft 4 in), and a depth of 3.84 metres (12 ft 7 in). It was assessed at 998 GRT, 480 NRT. The ship was powered by a triple expansion steam engine, which had cylinders of 40 centimetres (15 3/4 in), 64.7 centimetres (25 15/32 in) and 110.0 centimetres (43 5/16 in) diameter by 75 centimetres (29 1/2 in) stroke. The engine was built by Bremer Vulkan and was rated at 160nhp. The engine drove a single screw propeller, and could propel the ship at 10 knots (19 km/h).

== History ==
The ship was built in Bremen-Vegesack by Bremer Vulkan in 1909 as Toreador for J. D. Stücken, Bremen. It was launched on 31 July. J. D. Stücken operated it until 1916, when it was bought by the Argo Line, Bremen. Renamed Düsseldorf, it was captured off the coast of Norway by the Royal Navy Q-ship HMS Tay and Tyne between 19 and 24 February 1918 whist on a voyage from Tromsø, Norway to Stettin with a cargo of iron ore. It was seized by the British government and was renamed Poldorf. The United Kingdom Official Number 142674 was allocated. Due to the ship being captured in neutral waters, a legal dispute with Norway came before the British Prize Court in July 1920. Judgement was given that the declaration of the ship as a British prize could not be reversed.

In 1919, the ship was returned to Argo Line and reverted to its previous name. In 1923, Argo Line merged with the Roland Line to form Dampfschifffahrtsgesellschaft Argo mbH. The ship was renamed Falke, serving with the Roland Line. The Code Letters QJRM were allocated. Around 1925/26, Dampfschifffahrtsgesellschaft Argo mbH was absorbed by Norddeutscher Lloyd. Falke was transferred to Argo Reederei AG in 1934, in which year the Code Letters DOBY were allocated. The ship was transferred to Argo Reederei Richard Adler & Co. in 1937.

Falke was requisitioned by the Kriegsmarine and converted into a Vorpostenboot, joining the 1st Vorpostenflotille on 1 October 1939. On 1 October 1940, the 1st flotilla was disbanded and Falke was designated as a Sperrbrecher, or mine clearing ship. It was given the identification number of 34, which was later changed to 134. It was bombed and sank off Lorient on 8 August 1944.
