= French ship Gapeau (B284) =

German and French fishing trawler and auxiliary warship

History
- Name: Johann Schulte (1939–47); Gapeau (1947– )
- Owner: Großer Kürfurst Heringfischerei AG (1939–40); Kriegsmarine (1940–45); French Navy (1945–69)
- Port of registry: (Nazi Germany) Emden, Germany (1937–39); Kriegsmarine (1939–44); French Navy (1946–69)
- Builder: Schulte & Bruns, Emden
- Yard number: 130
- Launched: 22 March 1939
- Completed: 27 April 1939
- Commissioned: 7 January 1940
- Identification: Fishing boat registration AE 194 (1939–40); Code Letters DGNI (1939-45); Pennant Number M 1406 (1940–42); Pennant Number M 4417 (1942); Pennant Number V 625 (1943–45); Pennant Number Na 80 (1945–46); Pennant Number B 284/A 616 (1946–69)
- Fate: Scrapped

General characteristics
- Type: Fishing trawler (1937–39, 1969–70); Minesweeper (1939–43, 1946–47); Vorpostenboot (1943); Transport ship (1947–69)
- Tonnage: 298 GRT, 136 NRT
- Length: 36.37 m (119 ft 4 in)
- Beam: 7.49 metres (24 ft 7 in)
- Depth: 3.20 m (10 ft 6 in)
- Installed power: Diesel engine, 94nhp
- Propulsion: Single screw propeller
- Speed: 10.5 knots (19.4 km/h)
- Complement: 23 (Gapeau)
- Armament: Unarmed (Gapeau)

Gapeau was a French transport ship which was built as the German fishing trawler Johann Schulte in 1939. She was requisitioned by the Kriegsmarine during the Second World War. She was used as a minesweeper under the pennant numbers M 1406 and M 4417, and later as the Vorpostenboot V 625 Johann Schulte. She was sunk in 1945. Seized by the French post-war and entered service with the French Navy as Gapeau. Sold in 1969, she was scrapped in 1970.

== Description ==
The ship 36.37 m (119 ft 4 in) long, with a beam of 7.49 metres (24 ft 7 in). She had a depth of 3.20 m (10 ft 6 in). She was assessed at 298 GRT, 136 NRT. She was powered by a diesel engine, which had 8 cylinders of 28 centimetres (11 in) diameter by 44.9 centimetres (17 11/16 in) stroke. The engine was built by Klöckner-Humboldt-Deutz AG, Köln, Germany, and was rated at 94 nhp or 500 bhp. It drove a single screw which could propel the ship at 10.5 knots (19.4 km/h).

== History ==
Gapeau was built as yard number 130 by Schulte & Bruns, Emden, Germany. She was launched as the fishing vessel Johann Schulte on 22 March 1939 and completed on 27 April. She was owned by the Großer Kürfurst Heringfischerei AG, Emden. Her port of registry was Emden. She was allocated the Code Letters DGNI, and the fishing boat registration AE 104.

On 7 January 1940, Johann Schulte was requisitioned by the Kriegsmarine, serving with 14 Minensuchflotille as the minesweeper M 1406. On 22 March 1942, she was reallocated to 44 Minensuchflotille and her pennant number was changed to M 4417. On 1 January 1943, she was designated as a vorpostenboot. She was allocated to 6 Vorpostenflotille as V 625 Johann Schulte. She was sunk in 1945.

Later in 1945, Johann Schulte was seized by the French at Saint-Nazaire. Her pennant number was changed to Na 80. She was repaired, entering service with the 28ème Division de Drageurs on 1 January 1946, based at Brest, Finistère. Her pennant number was later changed to B284 and, again, to A616. On 5 December 1947, she was taken out of service and rebuilt as a "regional transport", re-entering service named Gapeau, the third ship of the French Navy bearing that name. Her complement was 22 crew and an officer. She was unarmed. She was initially based at Lorient, Morbihan, and later at Oran, Algeria, in the Mediterranean Sea, providing cabotage to the Demi-Brigade de Fusiliers-Marins, operating between Oran and Nemours, Algeria. Gapeau completed her 100th Oran–Nemours round-trip on 12 March 1959 and on 23 April was placed into ready reserve.

Gapeau was condemned on 20 November 1969 and allocated the disposal number Q 455 and then sold. She was scrapped at Brest in 1970.
