= German trawler V 622 Almuth =

German fishing trawler and vorpostenboot

History
- Name: Almuth
- Owner: Leerer Heringfischerei (1937–39); Kriegsmarine (1939–44)
- Port of registry: (Nazi Germany) Leer, Germany (1939); Kriegsmarine (1939–44)
- Builder: Schulte & Bruns, Emden
- Yard number: 117
- Launched: 5 May 1937
- Completed: 8 July 1937
- Commissioned: 11 September 1939
- Out of service: 5 June 1944
- Identification: Fishing boat registration AL 39 (1937–39); Code Letters DGLA (1937-44); Pennant Number M 1403 (1939–42); Pennant Number M 4414 (1942–43); Pennant Number V 622 (1944)
- Fate: Struck a mine and sank

General characteristics
- Type: Fishing trawler (1937–39); Minesweeper (1939–43); Vorpostenboot (1944)
- Tonnage: 269 GRT, 120 NRT
- Length: 35.76 m (117 ft 4 in)
- Beam: 7.49 metres (24 ft 7 in)
- Depth: 3.28 m (10 ft 9 in)
- Installed power: Diesel engine, 94nhp
- Propulsion: Single screw propeller
- Speed: 11 knots (20 km/h)

Almuth was a German fishing trawler which was built in 1937. She was requisitioned by the Kriegsmarine during the Second World War. She was used as a minesweeper under the pennant numbers M 1403 and M 4414, and later as the Vorpostenboot V 622 Almuth. She struck a mine and sank in June 1944.

== Description ==
The ship was 35.76 m (117 ft 4 in) long, with a beam of 7.49 metres (24 ft 7 in). She had a depth of 3.28 m (10 ft 9 in). She was assessed at 269 GRT, 120 NRT. She was powered by a diesel engine, which had 8 cylinders of 28 centimetres (11 in) diameter by 44.9 centimetres (17 11/16 in) stroke. The engine was built by Klöckner-Humboldt-Deutz AG, Köln, Germany. It was rated at 94 nhp. It drove a single screw propeller. It could propel the ship at 11 knots (20 km/h).

== History ==
Almuth was built as yard number 117 by Schulte & Bruns, Emden, Germany. She was launched on 5 May 1937 and completed on 8 July. She was owned by the Leerer Heringfischerei AG, Leer. Her port of registry was Leer. She was allocated the Code Letters DGLA, and the fishing boat registration AL 36.

On 11 September 1939, Almuth was requisitioned by the Kriegsmarine, serving with 14 Minensuchflotille as the minesweeper M 1403. On 12 April 1942, she was reallocated to 44 Minensuchflotille and her pennant number was changed to M 4414. On 1 January 1943, she was designated as a vorpostenboot. She was allocated to 6 Vorpostenflotille as V 622 Almuth. On 5 June 1944, she struck a mine off Saint-Nazaire, Loire-Inférieure, France (47°06′07″N 2°25′06″W). She was taken in tow but consequently sank.
