= SS Phönix =

German cargo ship

History
- Name: Phönix (1913–39); VP-106 Phönix (1939–40); Sperrbrecher 36 (1940–41); Sperrbrecher 136 (1941–44)
- Owner: Dampfschifffahrtsgesellschaft Argo AG (1913–23); Roland Line (1923–25/26); Norddeutscher Lloyd (1925/25–33); Argo Reederei AG (1933–37); Argo Reederei Richard Adler & Co. (1937–39); Kriegsmarine (1939–44)
- Port of registry: (German Empire) Bremen, Germany (1913–19); (Weimar Republic) Bremen, Germany (1919–34); Germany Bremen, Germany (1934–39); Kriegsmarine (1939–44)
- Builder: Stettiner Oderwerke
- Launched: 28 January 1913
- Out of service: 25 August 1944
- Identification: Code Letters QKGL (1919–34); Code Letters DOBK (1934–44); Pennant Number VP-106 (1939–40)
- Fate: Scuttled 25 August 1944

General characteristics
- Tonnage: 999 GRT, 530 NRT
- Length: 71.93 m (236 ft 0 in)
- Beam: 9.86 m (32 ft 4 in)
- Depth: 4.14 m (13 ft 7 in)
- Installed power: Triple expansion steam engine, 205nhp
- Propulsion: Screw propeller

Phönix was a cargo ship built in 1913 by Stettiner Oderwerke, Stettin, Germany for Dampfschifffahrtsgesellschaft Argo AG, Bremen, Germany. She served with a number of German shipping lines before being requisitioned in 1939 by the Kriegsmarine as VP-106 Phönix, later serving as Sperrbrecher 36 and Sperrbrecher 136. She was scuttled at Saint-Nazaire, Loire-Inférieure, France on 25 August 1944.

== Description ==
The ship was 71.93 metres (236 ft 0 in) long, with a beam of 9.88 metres (32 ft 5 in) and a depth of 4.14 metres (13 ft 7 in). She was assessed at 999 GRT, 530 NRT. She was powered by a triple expansion steam engine, which had cylinders of 55 centimetres (21 3/4 in), 91 centimetres (35 4/5 in) and 144.9 centimetres (57 1/16 in) diameter by 120 centimetres (48 in) stroke. The engine was built by Stettiner Oderwereke. It was rated at 205nhp and drove a single screw propeller.

== History ==
Phönix was built by Stettiner Oderwerke, Stettin, Germany for Dampfschifffahrtsgesellschaft Argo AG, Bremen. She was launched on 28 January 1913. Her port of registry was Bremen and the Code Letters QKGL were allocated.

In 1923, Dampfschifffahrtsgesellschaft Argo AG merged with the Roland Line, which was itself absorbed by Norddeutscher Lloyd in 1925/26. Phönix was transferred to Argo Reederei AG in 1933, then to Argo Reederei Richard Adler & Co. in 1937. Her Code Letters changed to DOBK in 1934.

On 1 October 1939, Phönix was requisitioned by the Kriegsmarine for use as a Vorpostenboot. She served with 1 Vorpostenbootflotille as VP-106 Phönix. She was transferred to 3 Sperrbrecherflotille on 1 October 1940 and was designated Sperrbrecher 36, beinhg redesignated Sperrbrecher 136 on 1 August 1941. She was scuttled by her crew at Saint-Nazaire, Loire-Inférieure, France on 25 August 1944.
