= German minesweeper M 1507 Teutonia =

History
- Name: Teutonia (1937–48); Rouget (1948–61)
- Owner: N. Ebsling (1937–39); Kriegsmarine (1939–45); French government (1945–48); P. Le Garrec (1948–61)
- Port of registry: (Nazi Germany) Bremerhaven, Germany (1937–39); Kriegsmarine (1939–45); France (1945–48); Marseille, France (1948– ); Boulogne, France ( –1961)
- Builder: Howaldtswerke
- Yard number: 763
- Launched: 17 June 1937
- Completed: 23 July 1937
- Commissioned: 28 September 1939
- Decommissioned: May 1945
- Out of service: 1961
- Identification: Code Letters DOSP (1937–45); Fishing boat registration BX 258 (1937–39); Pennant Number M 1507 (1939–43); Pennant Number V 214 (1943–44); Pennant Number M 4628 (1944–45); Code Letters PFUD (1948– ); Code Letters FOQR ( –61)
- Fate: Scrapped

General characteristics
- Tonnage: 487 GRT, 188 NRT
- Length: 53.80 metres (176 ft 6 in)
- Beam: 8.30 metres (27 ft 3 in)
- Draught: 4.10 metres (13 ft 5 in)
- Depth: 4.65 metres (15 ft 3 in)
- Installed power: Triple expansion steam engine, 121nhp
- Propulsion: Single screw propeller
- Speed: 10 knots (19 km/h)

M 1507 Teutonia was a German fishing trawler that was requisitioned by the Kriegsmarine in the Second World War for use as an auxiliary minesweeper. Built as Teutonia, she served as M 1507 Teutonia, the vorpostenboot V 204 Teutonia and M 4628 Teutonia. She became the French fishing trawler Rouget post-war and was scrapped in 1961.

== Description ==
The ship was 53.80 metres (176 ft 6 in) long, with a beam of 8.30 metres (27 ft 3 in). She had a depth of 4.65 metres (15 ft 3 in) and a draught of 4.10 metres (13 ft 5 in). She was assessed at 487 GRT, 188 NRT. She was powered by a triple expansion steam engine, which had cylinders of 37 centimetres (14 3/4 in), 61 centimetres (24 in) and 97 centimetres (38 3/8 in) diameter by 64.9 centimetres (25 9/16 in) stroke. The engine was built by Howaldtswerke AG, Kiel, Germany. It was rated at 121nhp.

== History ==
Teutonia was built as yard number 736 by Howaldtswerke, Hamburg, Germany for N. Ebsling, Bremerhaven. She was launched on 17 June 1937 and completed on 23 July. The fishing boat registration BX 258 was allocated, as were the Code Letters DOSP.

On 28 September 1939, Teutonia was requisitioned by the Kriegsmarine for use as an auxiliary minesweeper. She was allocated to 15 Minensuchflotille as M 1507. On 15 April 1940, she was escorting the steamships Bahia Castillo, Dessau and Pernambuco along with the minesweepers M 1501 Gauleiter Burkel, M 1502 Wien, M 1503 Holstein, M 1505 Tirol, M 1506 Ostfriesland, M 1503 Kurmark, the submarine chaser UJ 119 and two R boats when the convoy was attacked off the Oslofjord by the submarine HMS Sterlet. A torpedo fired at Bahia Castillo narrowly missed the ship. In March 1943, 15 Minensuchflotille was disbanded. On 29 April 1943, She was allocated to 2 Vorpostenflotille, becoming the vorpostenboot V 214 Teutonia. On 1 December 1944, she was transferred to 46 Minensuchflotille as M 4628 Teutonia.

Post war, she was seized by France, becoming the merchant fishing trawler Rouget in 1948. She was owned by P. Le Garrec, Marseille, Bouches-du-Rhône. The Code Letters FPUD were allocated. By 1960, she had been sold to Armament Guille Frères, Boulogne, Pas-de-Calais. Her Code Letters were then FOQR. She was scrapped in 1961.

== Sources ==
- Gröner, Erich (1993). Die deutschen Kriegsschiffe 1815-1945 (in German). Vol. 8/I: Flußfahrzeuge, Ujäger, Vorpostenboote, Hilfsminensucher, Küstenschutzverbände (Teil 1). Koblenz: Bernard & Graefe. ISBN 3-7637-4807-5.
