= French ship Molène =

German and French fishing trawler and auxiliary warship

History
- Name: Köln (1937–47); Molène (1947– )
- Owner: Emder Heringfischerei AG (1937–39); Kriegsmarine (1939–44); French Navy (1946–63); Unknown (1963– )
- Port of registry: (Nazi Germany) Emden, Germany (1937–39); Kriegsmarine (1939–44); French Navy (1946–63)
- Builder: Schulte & Bruns, Emden
- Yard number: 115
- Launched: 15 April 1937
- Completed: 17 June 1937
- Commissioned: 9 October 1939
- Identification: Fishing boat registration AE 22 (1937–39); Code Letters DGKY (1939-44); Pennant Number M 1405 (1939–42); Pennant Number M 4416 (1942); Pennant Number V 620 (1943–44); Pennant Number Na 81 (1944–47); Pennant Number B 262 (1947–63)

General characteristics
- Type: Fishing trawler (1937–9, 1963– ); Minesweeper (1939–43, 1946–47); Vorpostenboot (1943); Transport ship (1947–63)
- Tonnage: 269 GRT, 121 NRT
- Length: 35.76 m (117 ft 4 in)
- Beam: 7.49 metres (24 ft 7 in)
- Depth: 3.28 m (10 ft 9 in)
- Installed power: Diesel engine, 94nhp
- Propulsion: Single screw propeller
- Speed: 11 knots (20 km/h)

Molène was a French transport ship which was built as the German fishing trawler Köln in 1937. She was requisitioned by the Kriegsmarine during the Second World War. She was used as a minesweeper under the Pennant numbers M 1405 and M 4416, and later as the Vorpostenboot V 624 Köln. Severely damaged by a mine in 1943, she was laid up. She was seized by the French post war and entered service with the French Navy as Molène. She was sold out of service in 1963.

== Description ==
The ship 35.76 m (117 ft 4 in) long, with a beam of 7.49 metres (24 ft 7 in). She had a depth of 3.28 m (10 ft 9 in). She was assessed at 269 GRT, 121 NRT. She was powered by a diesel engine, which had 8 cylinders of 28 centimetres (11 in) diameter by 44.9 centimetres (17 11/16 in) stroke. The engine was built by Klöckner-Humboldt-Deutz AG, Köln, Germany and was rated at 94 nhp or 500 bhp. It drove a single screw which could propel the ship at 11 knots (20 km/h).

== History ==
Molène was built as yard number 117 by Schulte & Bruns, Emden, Germany. She was launched as the fishing vessel Köln on 15 April 1937 and completed on 17 June. She was owned by the Emder Heringfischerei AG, Emden. Her port of registry was Emden. She was allocated the Code Letters DGKY, and the fishing boat registration AE 22.

On 9 October 1939, Köln was requisitioned by the Kriegsmarine, serving with 14 Minensuchflotille as the minesweeper M 1405. On 12 April 1942, she was reallocated to 44 Minensuchflotille and her pennant number was changed to M 4416. On 1 January 1943, she was designated as a vorpostenboot. She was allocated to 6 Vorpostenflotille as V 624 Köln. On 31 July 1943, she struck a mine at the mouth of the Loire (47°04′N 2°37′W) and was severely damaged, with her stern destroyed. She as taken in to Saint-Nazaire, Loire-Inférieure, France and laid up.

In 1944, Köln was seized by the French. Her pennant number was changed to Na 81. In 1946, she was repaired, entering service with the 28ème Division de Drageurs. On 17 August, her pennant number was changed to B 262. On 5 December 1947, she was taken out of service and rebuilt as a transport ship for naval personnel, renamed Molène and based at Brest. She was decommissioned and condemned in 1963 and allocated the disposal number Q 340, then sold on 9 July.
