= German trawler V 108 Porjus =

German Vorpostenboot

History

Germany
- Name: Porjus (1937–40); Sperrbrecher 38 (1940– ); Sperrbrecher 133 ( –1945)
- Builder: Flender Werft – Lubeck
- Launched: 24 April 1937
- Commissioned: 1 October 1939
- Decommissioned: 1945
- Identification: Code Letters DJTM (1937–45); Pennant number V-108 (1939)
- Fate: Survived the war and returned to civilian service

Greece
- Name: Alkimini; Vassilakis; Mona
- Fate: Wrecked 27 November 1976

General characteristics
- Type: Cargo ship
- Tonnage: 764 GRT, 355 NRT
- Length: 61.67 m (202 ft 4 in)
- Beam: 9.53 m (31 ft 3 in)
- Depth: 3.73 m (12 ft 3 in)
- Installed power: Diesel engine
- Propulsion: Single screw propeller

V 108 Porjus was a German cargo ship that was converted into a Vorpostenboot for the Kriegsmarine during World War II. After the war, she returned to civilian service as a cargo ship in Greece, being known by the names Alkimini, Vassilakis and finally Mona. The ship was wrecked off Cheka on 27 November 1976.

== Description ==
The ship was 61.67 m (202 ft 4 in) long, with a beam of 9.53 m (31 ft 3 in) and a depth of 3.73 m (12 ft 3 in). She was powered by a 4-stroke single cycle single acting diesel engine driving a single screw propeller. The engine had eight cylinders of 38.6 centimetres (15 3/16 in) diameter by 57.9 centimetres (22 13/16 in) stroke. It was rated at 179nhp and was built by Deutsche Werft, Kiel.

== History ==
Porjus was built in 1937 by Lübecker Flenderwerke, Lübeck, Germany for the Afrikanische Frucht-Compagnie A.G., Hamburg. She was launched on 24 April. Porjus was operated under the management of Reederei F. Laeisz GmbH. Her port of registry was Hamburg and the Code Letters DJTM were allocated. On 1 October 1939, she was requisitioned by the Kriegsmarine for use as a Vorpostenboot. She served with 1 Vorpostenbootflottille as V-108 Porjus until December. She subsequently served as the minesweeper Sperrbrecher 38, later Sperrbrecher 133.

Post-war, Porjus was sold to Greece. She served under the names Alkimini, Vassilakis and Mona. She was wrecked off Cheka on 27 November 1976.
