= German trawler V 620 Derfflinger =

German fishing trawler

History
- Name: Derfflinger (1939–48); André Guillaume (1948–53)
- Owner: Großer Kurfürst Heringfischerei AG (1939); Kriegsmarine (1939–45); French Navy (1945–48); Sociètè de Pesche Industrielle (1948–53)
- Port of registry: (Nazi Germany) Emden, Germany (1939); Kriegsmarine (1939–45); French Navy (1945–48); Boulogne, France (1948–53)
- Builder: Schulte & Bruns, Emden
- Yard number: 128
- Launched: 16 February 1939
- Completed: 29 March 1939
- Commissioned: 9 October
- Out of service: December 1953
- Identification: Fishing boat registration AE 95 (1939); Code Letters DGMY (1939-45); Fishing boat registration AE 95 (1939); Pennant Number M 1401 (1939–42); Pennant Number M 4412 (1942–43); Pennant Number V 620 (1943–45); Pennant Number B 283 (1945–48); Fishing boat registration B 2487 (1948–53)
- Fate: Scrapped

General characteristics
- Type: Fishing trawler (1939, 1948–53); Minesweeper (1939–43, 1945–48); Vorpostenboot (1939–45)
- Tonnage: 298 GRT, 136 NRT
- Length: 36.37 m (119 ft 4 in)
- Beam: 7.49 metres (24 ft 7 in)
- Depth: 3.20 m (10 ft 6 in)
- Installed power: Diesel engine, 94nhp
- Propulsion: Single screw propeller
- Speed: 10.5 knots (19.4 km/h)

Derfflinger was a German fishing trawler which was built in 1939. She was requisitioned by the Kriegsmarine during the Second World War. She was used as a minesweeper under the pennant numbers M 1401 and M 4412, and later as the Vorpostenboot V 620 Derfflinger. She was seized by the French post war and entered service with the French Navy. Sold in 1948, she became the fishing trawler André Guillaume. She was scrapped in December 1953.

== Description ==
The ship 36.37 m (119 ft 4 in) long, with a beam of 7.49 metres (24 ft 7 in). She had a depth of 3.20 m (10 ft 6 in). She was assessed at 298 GRT, 136 NRT. She was powered by a diesel engine, which had 8 cylinders of 28 centimetres (11 in) diameter by 44.9 centimetres (17 11/16 in) stroke. The engine was built by Klöckner-Humboldt-Deutz AG, Köln, Germany. It was rated at 94 nhp. It drove a single screw propeller. It could propel the ship at 10.5 knots (19.4 km/h).

== History ==
Derfflinger was built as yard number 128 by Schulte & Bruns, Emden, Germany. She was launched on 16 February 1939 and completed on 29 March. She was owned by the Großer Kurfürst Heringfischerei AG, Emden Her port of registry was Emden. She was allocated the Code Letters DGMY, and the fishing boat registration AE 95.

On 9 October 1939, Derfflinger was requisitioned by the Kriegsmarine, serving with 14 Minensuchflotille as the minesweeper M 1401. On 22 March 1942, she was reallocated to 44 Minensuchflotille and her pennant number was changed to M 4412. On 1 January 1943, she was designated as a vorpostenboot. She was allocated to 6 Vorpostenflotille as V 620 Derfflinger. In 1945, she was seized by the French and entered service with the French Navy as part of the 28eme Division de Drageurs. She was allocated the Pennant Number B 283.

On 4 September 1948, she was sold to the Société de Péche Industrielle, Boulogne, and was renamed André Guillaume. The fishing boat B 2487 was allocated. She served until December 1953, when she was scrapped.
