= List of ship launches in 1922 =

The list of ship launches in 1922 includes a chronological list of some ships launched in 1922.

Date	Ship	Class / type	Builder	Location	Country	Notes
21 January	Kauldi	Cargo ship	Blyth Shipbuilding & Dry Docks Co. Ltd	Blyth	United Kingdom	For Compagnia Naviera Bachi.
23 January	Douwe Aukes	Douwe Aukes-class minelayer	Gusto Shipyard	Schiedam	Netherlands	
13 February	Maid of Psara	Grain steamer	Cammell Laird	Birkenhead	United Kingdom	For the Byron Steamship Company
14 February	Baragoola	Ferry	Mort's Dockyard and Engineering Company Limited	Balmain	Australia	For Port Jackson & Manly Steamship Company
14 February	Mulbera	Ocean liner	Alexander Stephen and Sons	Glasgow, Scotland	United Kingdom	For British-India Steam Navigation Company
15 February	Yura	Nagara-class cruiser	Sasebo Naval Arsenal	Sasebo, Nagasaki	Japan	
16 February	Natori	Nagara-class cruiser	Mitsubishi Heavy Industries	Nagasaki	Japan	
25 February	Numakaze	Minekaze-class destroyer	Maizuru Naval Arsenal	Maizuru, Kyoto	Japan	
2 March	Diogenes	Passenger ship	Harland & Wolff	Belfast	United Kingdom	For Aberdeen Line.
2 March	Submarine No. 47 (Ro-58)	Type L3 submarine	Mitsubishi	Kobe	Japan	For Imperial Japanese Navy
10 March	Eastern Coast	Coaster	Harland & Wolff	Belfast	United Kingdom	For Coast Lines.
14 March	Chantilly	Passenger ship	Ateliers & Chantiers de la Loire	Saint-Nazaire	France	For Compagnie des Française de Navigation à Vapeur Chargeurs Réunis
15 March	Lassell	Cargo ship	Harland & Wolff	Belfast	United Kingdom	For Lamport & Holt.
17 March	B-3	B-class submarine	SECN	Cartagena	Spain	For Spanish Navy.
18 March	Westmorland	Tank barge	Frederick Braby & Co. Ltd.	Deptford	United Kingdom	For Anglo-American Oil Company Ltd.
18 March	Capitaine Le Moune	Caro ship	Forges et Chantiers de la Gironde	Lormont	France	For: French Government
2 April	Gouverner Général de Gueydon	Ocean liner	fr:Chantiers et ateliers de Provence	Port-de-Bouc	France	For: French Government
13 April	Submarine No. 62 (Ro-28)	Kaichū IV-type submarine	Sasebo Naval Arsenal	Sasebo	Japan	For Imperial Japanese Navy
24 April	Lochgoil	Cargo ship	Harland & Wolff	Glasgow	United Kingdom	For Royal Mail Line.
25 April	Nagara	Nagara-class cruiser	Sasebo Naval Arsenal	Sasebo, Nagasaki	Japan	
27 April	Motrix	Petrol tanker	Soc des Chantiers et Ateliers de Saint‑Nazaire–Penhoët	Le Grand-Quevilly, Rouen	France	Soc. Anon. Mazout-Transports
10 May	Capitaine-Le Diabat	Cargo ship	Ateliers et Chantiers de la Seine Maritime	Le Trait	France	For: Soc. Commerciale du Nord
15 May	Clair-de-Lune	Yacht	Chantiers M. Danet	Le Havre	France	For M. Marcel Danet
25 May	Savoia	Refrigerated cargo ship	Stabilimento Tecnico Triestino	Trieste	Italy	For Navigazione Liberia Triestina
25 May	Adda	Passenger ship	Harland & Wolff	Govan	United Kingdom	For Elder Dempster.
27 May	Lieutenant de Vaisseau Préchage	Cargo ship	Forges et Chantiers de la Gironde	Lormont	France	For: French Government
27 May	Joseph Vandewalle	Fishing vessel	Chantiers et Ateliers Augustin Normand	Le Havre	France	For: Soc. des Pêcheries de France
29 May	S-25	S-class submarine	Fore River Shipyard	Quincy, Massachusetts	United States	
29 May	Kinu	Nagara-class cruiser	Kawasaki Heavy Industries	Kobe	Japan	
30 May	Commandant Charles Meric	Collier	Chantiers Navals Français	Blainville-sur-Orne	France	For: French Government
May	British Corporal	Tanker	Palmers Shipbuilding and Iron Company	Jarrow	United Kingdom	For British Tanker Company
3 June	Sachsen	Cargo ship	Bremer Vulkan	Vegesack	Germany	For Hamburg-Amerika Linie.
8 June	Kamoi	Seaplane tender	New York Shipbuilding	Camden, New Jersey	United States	For Imperial Japanese Navy
17 June	Capitaine Henri Rallier	Cargo ship	Chantiers Navals Français	Caen	France	For: French Government
20 June	Gouverneur Général Cambon	Ocena liner	Forges et Chantiers de la Méditerranée	La Seyne	France	For: French Government
24 June	Namikaze	Minekaze-class destroyer	Maizuru Naval Arsenal	Maizuru, Kyoto	Japan	
27 June	S-24	S-class submarine	Bethlehem Shipbuilding Corporation	Quincy, Massachusetts	United States	
28 June	Submarine No. 59 (Ro-60)	Type L4 submarine	Mitsubishi	Kobe	Japan	For Imperial Japanese Navy
29 June	Detroit	Omaha-class cruiser	Bethlehem Shipbuilding Corporation	Quincy, Massachusetts	United States	
29 June	Herrlichkeit	Trawler	Reiherstieg Schiffswerfte & Maschinenfabrik	Hamburg	Germany	For Nordsee Deutsche Hochsee Fischerei Bremen-Cuxhaven AG
June	Choutte	Fishing vessel	Argentin-Pollett	Fecamp	France	For M. Pannevel,Saint Valery
June	Arcadia	Cargo ship	Deutsche Werft AG	Hamburg	Germany	For Hamburg-Amerika Packetfarht AG
1 July	Calumet	Refrigerated cargo ship	Harland & Wolff	Belfast	United Kingdom	For Elder Dempster.
3 July	Capitaine Prieur	Cargo ship	Ateliers et Chantiers de la Seine Maritime	Le Trait	France	For: French Government
4 July	Sutherland	Tank barge	Frederick Braby & Co. Ltd.	Deptford	United Kingdom	For Anglo-American Oil Company Ltd.
6 July	Volendam	Passenger ship	Harland & Wolff	Govan	United Kingdom	For Holland America Line.
22 July	Submarine No. 58 (Ro-27)	Kaichū IV-type submarine	Yokosuka Naval Arsenal	Yokosuka	Japan	For Imperial Japanese Navy
28 July	Léon Eugénie	Fishing vessel	Chantiers M. Danet	Le Havre	France	For M. Simon
8 August	Doric	Passenger ship	Harland & Wolff	Belfast	United Kingdom	For White Star Line.
12 August	Thuringia	Ocean liner	Howaldtswerke	Kiel	Germany	For Hamburg-Amerika Packetfarht AG
22 August	Ayrshire Coast	Coaster	Harland & Wolff	Belfast	United Kingdom	For Coast Lines.
22 August	S-26	S-class submarine	Bethlehem Shipbuilding Corporation	Quincy, Massachusetts	United States	
24 August	Mongolia	Ocean liner	Armstrong Whitworth	Newcastle-upon-Tyne, England	United Kingdom	For P&O
25 August	Tulsa	Asheville-class gunboat	Charleston Navy Yard	Charleston, South Carolina	United States	
26 August	Ambria	Cargo ship	Deutsche Werft AG	Finkenwerder	Germany	For Hamburg-Amerika Packetfarht AG
August	Botilla Russ	Cargo ship	Atlas Werke		Germany	
15 September	Leicester	Tank barge	Frederick Braby & Co. Ltd.	Deptford	United Kingdom	For Anglo-American Oil Company Ltd.
20 September	S-28	S-class submarine	Bethlehem Shipbuilding Corporation	Quincy, Massachusetts	United States	
21 September	Invergoil	Tanker	Harland & Wolff	Belfast	United Kingdom	For British Mexican Petroleum Company.
25 September	Kamikaze	Kamikaze-class destroyer	Mitsubishi Heavy Industries	Nagasaki	Japan	
30 September	Lurcher	coastal trading vessel	Harland & Wolff	Belfast	United Kingdom	For Coast Lines.
3 October	Nordland	Fishing trawler	Reiherstieg Schiffswerfte & Maschinenfabrik	Hamburg	Germany	For Deutsche Seefischerei.
18 October	S-27	S-class submarine	Bethlehem Shipbuilding Corporation	Quincy, Massachusetts	United States	
19 October	Rio Claro	Cargo ship	Blyth Shipbuilding & Dry Docks Co. Ltd	Blyth	United Kingdom	For Thompson Steam Shipping Co. Ltd.
22 October	Drechtdyk	Cargo ship	Harland & Wolff	Belfast	United Kingdom	For Holland America Line.
25 October	Raleigh	Omaha-class cruiser	Bethlehem Steel Corporation	Quincy, Massachusetts	United States	
31 October	B-4	B-class submarine	SECN	Cartagena	Spain	For Spanish Navy.
7 November	Ferry No.6	Ferry	Harland & Wolff	Belfast	United Kingdom	For Clyde Navigation Co.
7 November	Ferry No.7	Ferry	Harland & Wolff	Belfast	United Kingdom	For Clyde Navigation Co.
9 November	S-29	S-class submarine	Bethlehem Shipbuilding Corporation	Quincy, Massachusetts	United States	
18 November	Veendam	Passenger ship	Harland & Wolff	Belfast	United Kingdom	For Holland America Line.
5 December	Aydon	Cargo ship	Blyth Shipbuilding & Dry Docks Co. Ltd	Blyth	United Kingdom	For Aydon Steamship Co. Ltd.
5 December	Submarine No. 68 (Ro-29)	Kaichū V-type submarine	Kawasaki	Kobe	Japan	For Imperial Japanese Navy
7 December	Ediba	Passenger ship	Harland & Wolff	Belfast	United Kingdom	For African Steamship Co.
16 December	Albert Ballin	Ocean liner	Blohm + Voss	Hamburg	Germany	For Hamburg America Line
18 December	Harukaze	Kamikaze-class destroyer	Maizuru Naval Arsenal	Maizuru, Kyoto	Japan	
22 December	Submarine No. 57 (Ro-59)	Type L3 submarine	Mitsubishi	Kobe	Japan	For Imperial Japanese Navy
Unknown date	Adolph Woermann	Passenger ship	Blohm + Voss	Hamburg	Germany	For Woermann Linie AG
Unknown date	Anchor	Crane ship	I. J. Abdela & Mitchell Ltd.	Queensferry	United Kingdom	For L. Gueret & Co. Ltd.
Unknown date	Andania	Steamship	R. & W. Hawthorn, Leslie & Co. Ltd.	Newcastle upon Tyne	United Kingdom	For Cunard Line.
Unknown date	British Architect	Tanker	Blythwood Shipbuilding Co. Ltd.	Glasgow	United Kingdom	For British Tanker Co. Ltd.
Unknown date	Cap Norte	Passenger ship	Vulkan Werke	Hamburg	Germany	For Hamburg Süd Amerikanische Dampschiffarts-Gesellschaft A/S & Co. KG.
Unknown date	Cattaro	Cargo ship	Lindenau & Co, Memeler Schiffswerke	Memel	Germany	For Hamburg Amerikanische Packetfahrt AG
Unknown date	Cremon	Fishing trawler	Reiherstieg Schiffswerfte & Maschinenfabrik AG	Hamburg	Germany	
Unknown date	Dunstaffnage	Cargo ship	Lithgows Ltd.	Port Glasgow	United Kingdom	For private owner.
Unknown date	Ekaren	Cargo ship	William Doxford & Sons Ltd.	Pallion	United Kingdom	For Rederi Transatlantic A/B.
Unknown date	Erna	Coaster	Howaldtswerke	Kiel	Germany	For H A Petersen
Unknown date	Gisela L M Russ	Cargo ship	Stettiner Oderwerke AG	Stettin	Germany	For Ernst Russ
Unknown date	Glen Gower	Paddle steamer	Ailsa Shipbuilding Co Ltd.	Troon	United Kingdom	For P. & A. Campbell.
Unknown date	Herlichkeit	Fishing trawler	Reihersteig Schiffswerfte & Maschinenfabrik AG	Hamburg	Germany	For Deutsche Hochseefischerei Bremen-Cuxhaven.
Unknown date	Ingrid Horn	Cargo ship	Lübecker Maschinenbau-Gesellschaft	Lübeck	Germany	For H C Horn
Unknown date	Jose Menendes	Cargo liner	Ailsa Shipbuilding Co Ltd.	Troon	United Kingdom	For an Argentine owner.
Unknown date	Liebenfels	Cargo ship	AG Weser	Bremen	Germany	For Hansa Line.
Unknown date	Lucy	Sailing barge	J Oelkers	Hamburg	Germany	
Unknown date	Minna	Cargo ship	Nylands Verksted	Kristiania	Norway	For Trelleborgs Ångfartygs Nya AB
Unknown date	Moldavia	Passenger ship	Cammell Laird & Co. Ltd.	Birkenhead	United Kingdom	For Peninsular & Oriental Steam Navigation Company.
Unknown date	Morea	Cargo ship	[Schiffs- und Dockbau Flender	Lübeck	Germany	For Deutsche Levant Line.
Unknown date	Patia	Cargo ship			United Kingdom	For Elders & Fyffes Ltd.
Unknown date	Pinnau	Cargo ship	Nobiskrug Werft GmbH	Rendsburg	Germany	For Bugsier Reederei & Bergungs AG
Unknown date	Rudolph Albrecht	Tanker	F. Krupp AG.	Kiel	Germany	For Max Albrecht Kommandit.
Unknown date	Sandgate Castle	Cargo ship	Short Brothers Ltd.	Sunderland	United Kingdom	For Union-Castle Mail Steamship Co. Ltd.
Unknown date	Schwarzwald	Cargo ship	Deutsche Werft	Hamburg	Germany	For private owner.
Unknown date	Shildon	Cargo ship	Blyth Shipbuilding & Dry Docks Co. Ltd	Blyth	United Kingdom	For Tyneside Line (1920) Ltd.
Unknown date	Skylark 6	Passenger launch	J. Bolson & Son Ltd.	Poole	United Kingdom	For Jake Bolson.
Unknown date	Stainburn	Coaster	William Adams & Co.	Larne	United Kingdom	For Stainburn S.S. Co. Ltd.
Unknown date	Tertia	Cargo ship	F Schichau GmbH	Elbing	Germany	Flensburger Dampfschiffahrt Gesellschaft von 1869
Unknown date	Thysville	Ocean Liner	J. Cockerill S.A.	Hoboken	Belgium	For Compagnie Belge Maritime du Congo.
Unknown date	Tjibesar	Cargo ship	Lithgows Ltd.	Port Glasgow	United Kingdom	For Java-China-Japan Lijn.
Unknown date	Wadai	Passenger ship	Reiherstieg Schiffswerfte & Mashinenfabrik.	Hamburg	Germany	For Woermann Linig AG.
Unknown date	Wadigo	Cargo ship	Reiherstieg Schiffswerfte & Maschinenfabrik	Hamburg	Germany	For Woermann Linie AG
Unknown date	Werra	Cargo ship	AG Weser	Bremen	Germany	For Norddeutscher Lloyd.
Unknown date	Wildenfels	Cargo ship	Joh. C. Tecklenborg	Wesermünde	Germany	For Hansa Line.
Unknown date	Worcester	Tank barge	Frederick Braby & Co. Ltd.	Deptford	United Kingdom	For Anglo-American Oil Company Ltd.
