= Württemberg (disambiguation) =

Württemberg is a historical German territory roughly corresponding to Swabia.

Württemberg or Württemberger may also refer to:

== Places ==
- County of Württemberg (1083–1495), a county of the Holy Roman Empire
- Duchy of Württemberg (1495–1803), a duchy of the Holy Roman Empire
- Electorate of Württemberg (1803–1806), an electorate of the Holy Roman Empire
- Kingdom of Württemberg (1806–1918), a kingdom of the Confederation of the Rhine and the German Confederation
- Free People's State of Württemberg (1918–1945), part of the Weimar Republic and Nazi Germany
- Württemberg-Baden (1945–1952), a state of the Federal Republic of Germany
- Württemberg-Hohenzollern (1945–1952), a West German state created in 1945
- Baden-Württemberg (beginning 1952), a state in southwest Germany

== Other uses ==
- Württemberg (hill), Stuttgart, Germany
- Württemberg (wine region)
- Württemberg Cup, a regional cup competition of German football
- House of Württemberg, a German royal family and dynasty
- List of rulers of Württemberg, the former ruling House of Württemberg (kingdom abolished 1918)
- Württemberger, a breed of horse
- Württemberger or Merinolandschaf, a breed of sheep
- SMS Württemberg, two ships of the Imperial German Navy
- German trawler V 307 Württemberg, a Second World War vorpostenboot
