= AK-4 =

AK4, AK 4 or AK-4 may refer to:

- Richardson Highway, Alaska Route 4
- USS Bath (AK-4), a US navy ship
- Automatkarbin 4, the Swedish version of the Heckler & Koch G3 battle rifle, also known as Ak 4.
- AK4 (gene)
