= German minelayer Hansestadt Danzig =

German passenger ship

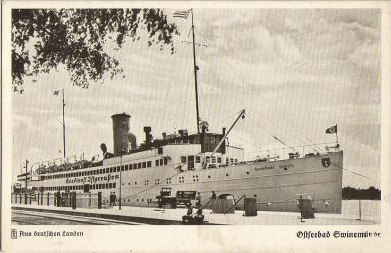
- Postcard of Hansestadt Danzig in Swinoujscie, around 1934–1938

History

Nazi Germany
- Name: Hansestadt Danzig
- Namesake: Gdańsk
- Owner: Seedienst Ostpreußen
- Builder: Oderwerke
- Launched: 17 March 1926
- Commissioned: 14 July 1926
- Home port: Swinemünde
- Fate: Requisitioned by Kriegsmarine, 1939

Nazi Germany
- Operator: Kriegsmarine
- Commissioned: August 1939
- Fate: Sunk by mine, 1941

General characteristics
- Type: Minelayer
- Tonnage: 2,225 GRT
- Length: 85.4 m (280 ft 2 in)
- Beam: 11.7 m (38 ft 5 in)
- Propulsion: 4,700 kW (6,300 hp)
- Speed: 16 knots (30 km/h)
- Complement: 225 crew
- Armament: 2 × single 8.8 cm SK L/45 naval guns; 4 × single 2 cm FlaK 30s; Up to 360 mines

Hansestadt Danzig was a German passenger ship from 1926 to 1939 serving the East Prussian Sea Service for Norddeutscher Lloyd. In 1939 she was converted by the Kriegsmarine to a troop transport and minelayer. She sank in 1941 when she ran into a minefield.

== Construction and early career ==
The ship was one of the newest ships to enter service for the East Prussian Sea Service in 1926. She was built by the Stettiner Oderwerke and was launched on March 17, 1926. The ship was equipped to carry passengers as well as a larger number of bicycles and several passenger cars. For night travel, passengers were provided with double cabins (3rd class) and berths.

The ship's propulsion system consisted of two four-stroke crosshead turbo-diesel engines manufactured by MAN, which produced 3,400 hp (2,500 kW) at 270 rpm without turbocharging and 6,400 hp (4,800 kW) at 320 rpm with turbocharging. It was the first ship to implement turbocharging by exhaust gas turbochargers. In 1933, she was lengthened by 10.5 m (34 ft) to incorporate additional safety equipment required by the International Convention for the Safety of Life at Sea, of which there is contemporary film footage.

For the East Prussian Sea Service, she sailed from 1926 to 1939 as a seagoing passeneger ship between Pomerania and East Prussia on the Stettin-Pillau-Königsberg route as well as on other Sea Service routes. Her homeport was Swinemünde.

== Kriegsmarine service ==
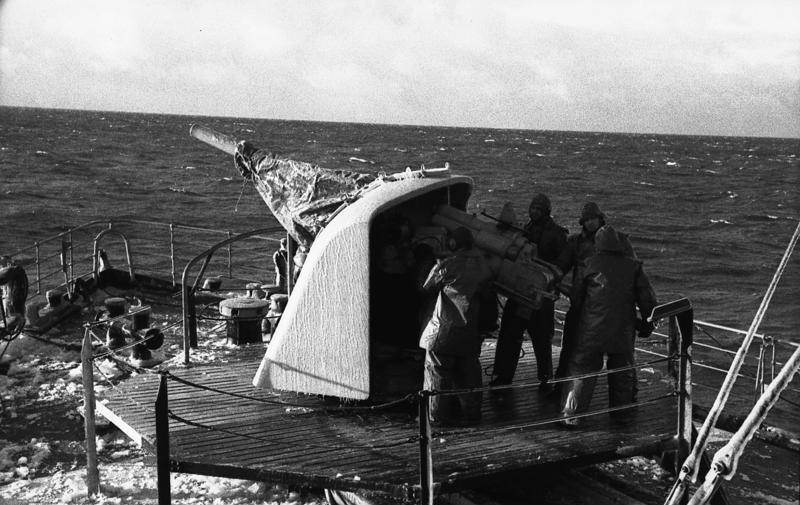
An 8.8 cm SK L/45 naval gun aboard Hansestadt Danzig

In August 1939, Hansestadt Danzig, which had been projected for wartime use, was requisitioned by the Kriegsmarine and converted her into a minelayer. Her first commander was former U-boat commander Hans Howaldt, who was, however, replaced by Wilhelm Schroeder after only two weeks.

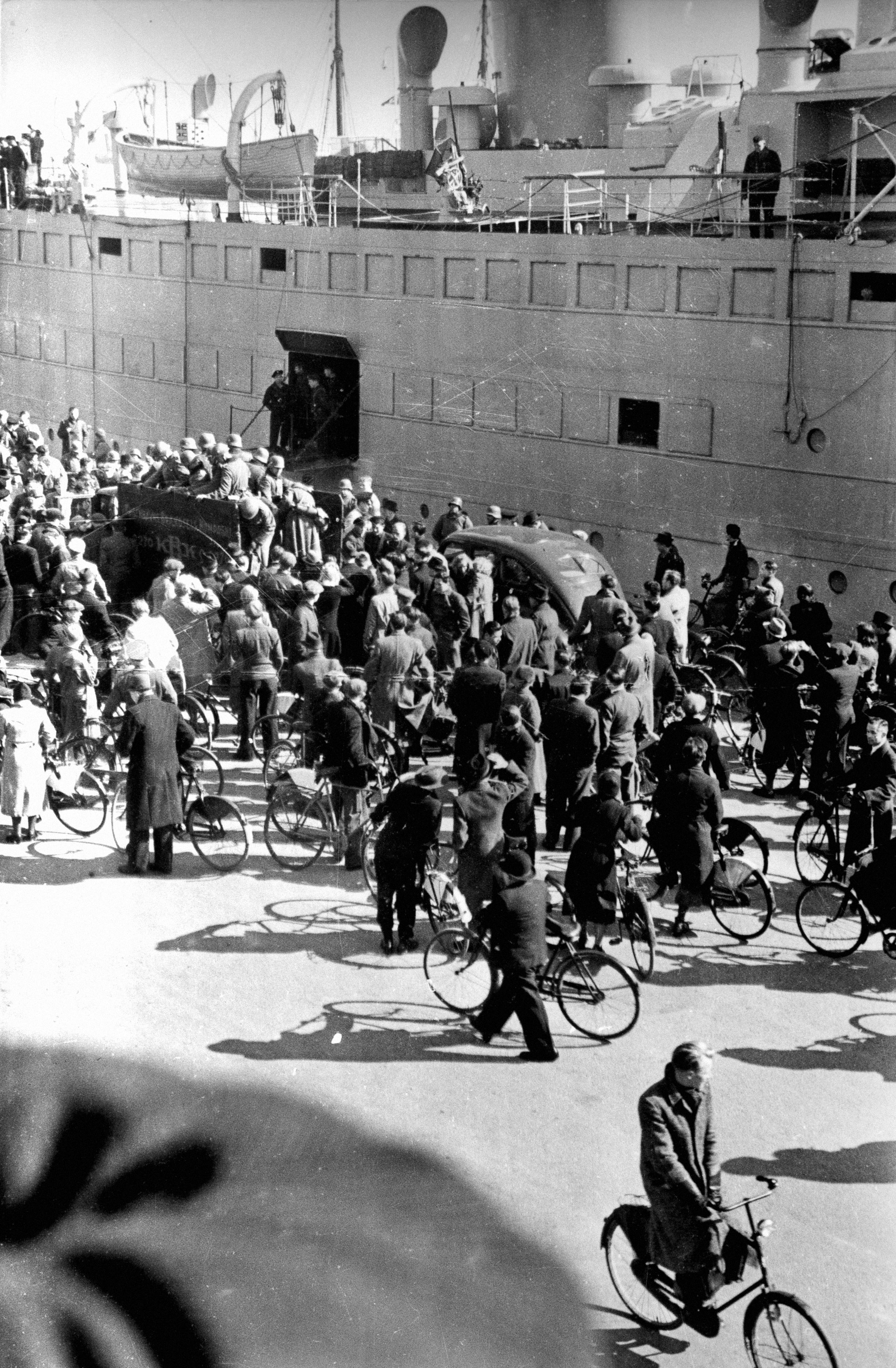
Hansestadt Danzig landing troops in Copenhagen harbor during the invasion of Denmark, 9 April 1940

On 7 April 1940, the ship departed Travemünde and, escorted by the icebreaker Stettin and the 13th Vorpostenboote flotilla, transported the II Battalion of Infantry Regiment 308 of the 198th Infantry Division, to Copenhagen for occupation as part of Operation Weserübung, where the troops landed at 5:00 a.m. on 9 April. The following day, Hansestadt Danzig brought the 2nd Battalion of the 308 Infantry Regiment to Rønne on the Danish island of Bornholm to occupy it as well. In January 1941, Hansestadt Danzig participated with other ships in laying the minefield "Pommern" in the North Sea and in June 1941 the minefield "Apolda" in the Baltic Sea.

=== Loss ===
On 9 July 1941, Hansestadt Danzig, together with the minelayers Preussen and Tannenberg, struck a Swedish minefield east of the southern tip of Öland at 56°15′5″N 16°43′5″E and sank near the village of Gräsgård. The minefield had been created by the Swedish Navy at the German request to block Soviet ships from passing near Öland. The Swedish Navy had informed the Oberkommando der Marine (OKM) of the location of the minefield, but the OKM did not pass on the information. Furthermore, the Swedish Navy had stationed its own minesweeper HSwMS Sandön in front of the minefield to warn incoming ships. Despite this warning, the German unit commander allowed his ships to continue sailing, and they were caught in the minefield in this way. Preussen and Tannenberg also ran into mines and sank. Nine crew members died in the sinking of Hansestadt Danzig.

Subsequently, many German naval officers were court-martialed, but only the mine officer in the OKM, who had not passed on information about the location of the minefield, was sentenced to one year's imprisonment in a fortress with suspended sentences until the end of the war.

Still in 1941, a memorial stone to the dead of the three minelayers was erected on the south coast of Öland near Össby, which was dedicated in the presence of Crown Prince Gustav VI Adolf and his wife Louise. In 1952, the wreck, lying at a depth of 29 metres (95 ft), was salvaged by the Swedish salvage company Intermarin and subsequently scrapped.
