= SS Stettin (1933) =

Steam icebreaker

Coordinates: 53°32′36.20″N 9°54′54.14″E

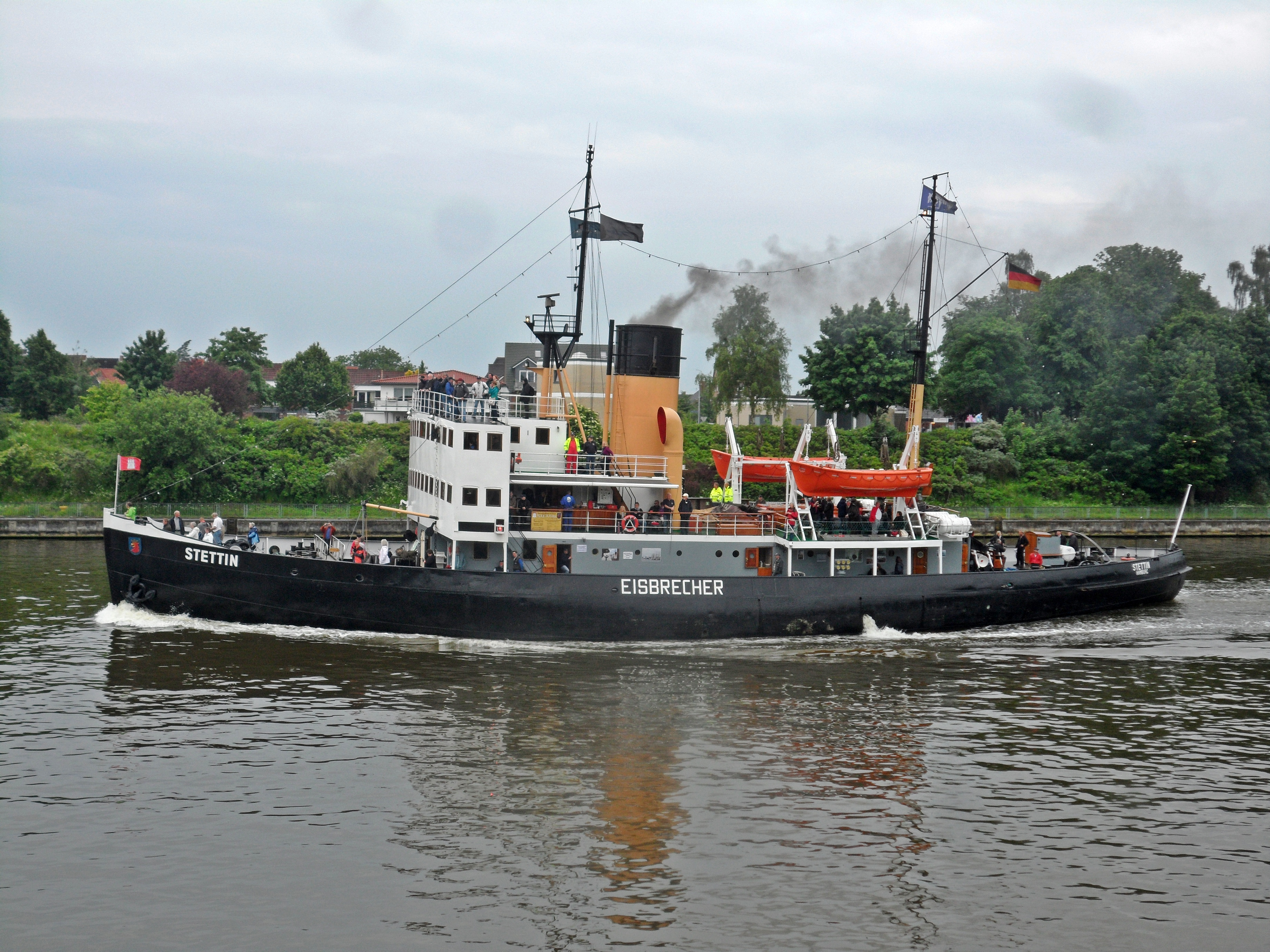
- SS Stettin in the Kiel Canal

History

Germany
- Name: SS Stettin
- Owner: Association Dampf-Eisbrecher Stettin e.V., Hamburg
- Builder: Stettiner Oderwerke
- Cost: 574.000 RM or 175.160 USD in 1933 equivalent 4.248.317 USD in 2024
- Yard number: 769
- Launched: 7 September 1933
- Christened: 16 November 1933
- Out of service: 1981
- Identification: IMO number: 8882923; MMSI number: 211357210; Callsign: DBCR
- Status: Museum ship

General characteristics
- Class & type: Germanischer Lloyd 100 A5 K E
- Tonnage: 783 tons
- Displacement: 1,138 tons
- Length: 51.75 m (169 ft 9 in)
- Beam: 13.43 m (44 ft 1 in)
- Height: 6.4 m (21 ft 0 in)
- Draught: 5.40 m (17 ft 9 in)
- Installed power: Steam, 2,200 hp (1,600 kW) at 115 rpm
- Propulsion: Triple expansion compound steam engine with Stephenson valve gear powered by 2 hard coal boilers consuming 600 - 1000 kg/h, capacity 5800 kg/h steam each at 14,5 bar and 196 °C
- Speed: 14.2 kn
- Capacity: 180 passengers
- Crew: 22

Stettin is a steam icebreaker built by the shipyard Stettiner Oderwerke in 1933. She was ordered by the Chamber of Commerce of Stettin (until 1945 Germany, since 1945 Szczecin, Poland). The economy of the city of Stettin strongly depended on the free access of ships to and from the Baltic Sea. Therefore, icebreakers were used to keep the shipping channels free from ice during the winter.

== Design ==
For the first time in Germany, the construction was characterized by a new bow design called Runeberg-bow. This new bow design broke the ice using a novel method. It was not broken by the weight of the ship but by a sharp cutting edge. Future development of icebreakers was influenced by this bow form.

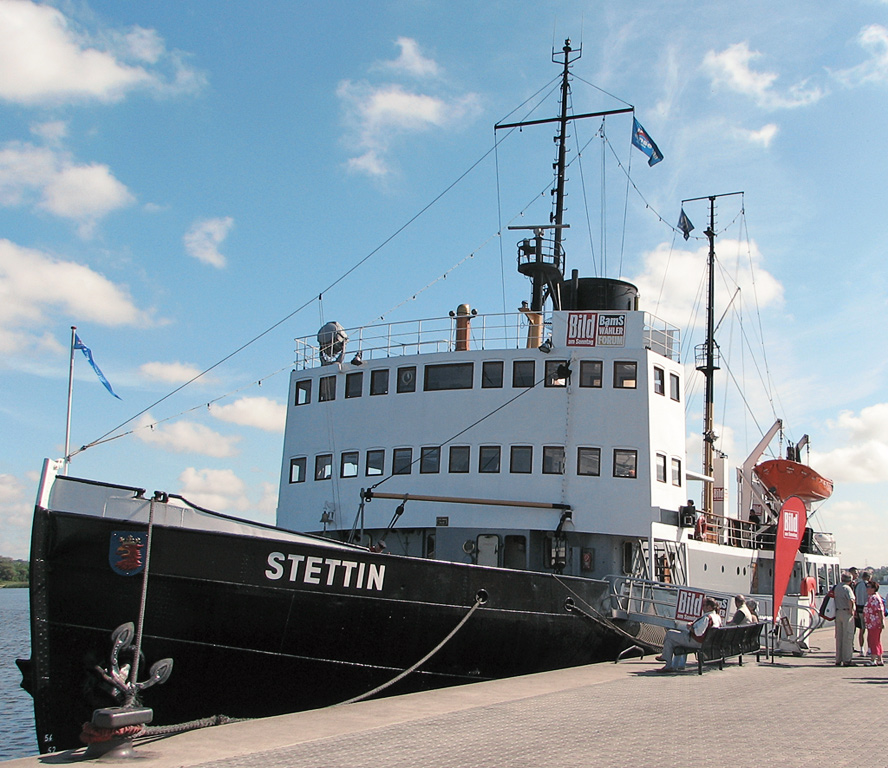
Stettin in Rostock harbour

Although diesel-engines were already in wide use by 1933, Stettin was equipped with a steam engine. Unlike diesel engines, steam engines can be reversed within a very short period of approximately 3 to 4 seconds. This was important during manoeuvres of the ship under icey conditions in order to liberate the ship if it were to get stuck.

With the special hull design and an engine power with a maximum horsepower of 2200, measured at the cylinders, Stettin was able to break ice up to a thickness of half a meter, at a constant speed of one to two knots. Thicker ice could only be broken by boxing, a process in which the ship ran several attacks until the ice gave way.

== Operational history ==
The icebreakers of Stettin were handled by the Braeunlich shipping company, which ran a seaside resort ferry service along the coast during the summer. Its other ships had similar engines, so a single technical staff could be employed year round. Stettin was run by a crew of 22 men. This system was in place until the end of World War II.

From 1933 to 1945, Stettin was used in German Navy (Kriegsmarine) service on the Oder River between Stettin and Swinemünde, as well as on the Baltic Sea. On the night of 8 April 1940, Stettin participated in the capture of Copenhagen by participating in a surprise landing of German troops in Copenhagen together with the railway ferry/minelayer Hansestadt Danzig. Stettin is one of two or three surviving vessels of the east Prussia evacuation fleet.

From 1945 on, she was used by the waterway and navigation authorities in Hamburg on the river Elbe.

=== Preservation ===
In 1981, Stettin was slated to be scrapped due to uneconomic costs. However, with the establishment of a development association, thousands of working hours, and support by generous sponsors, the ship was saved. Today, she is a technical culture monument. Her homeport is the museum port of Oevelgoenne in Hamburg, Germany. During summertime, Stettin cruises with invited guests on occasions like "Hamburg port birthday," "Hansesail Rostock," and "Kieler Woche," and is also used as a charter vessel.

Gallery

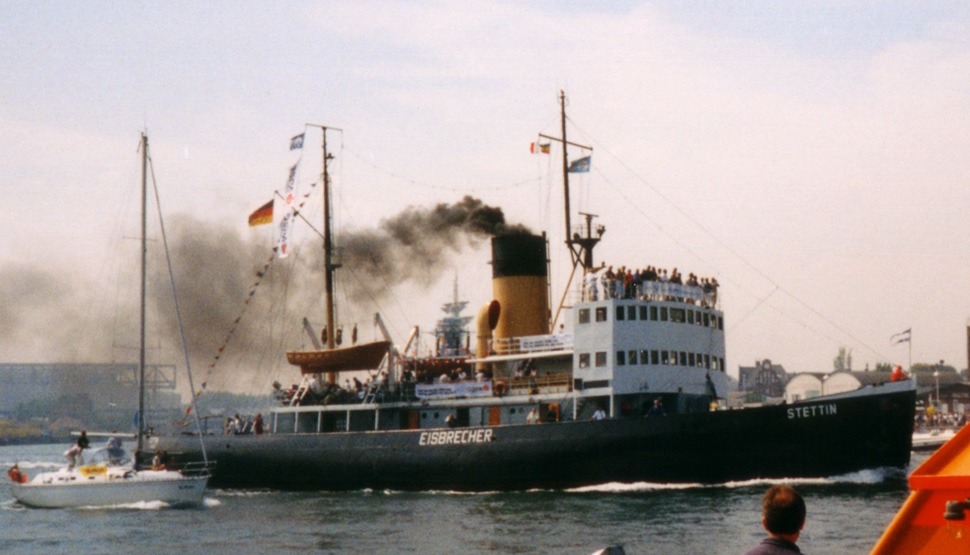

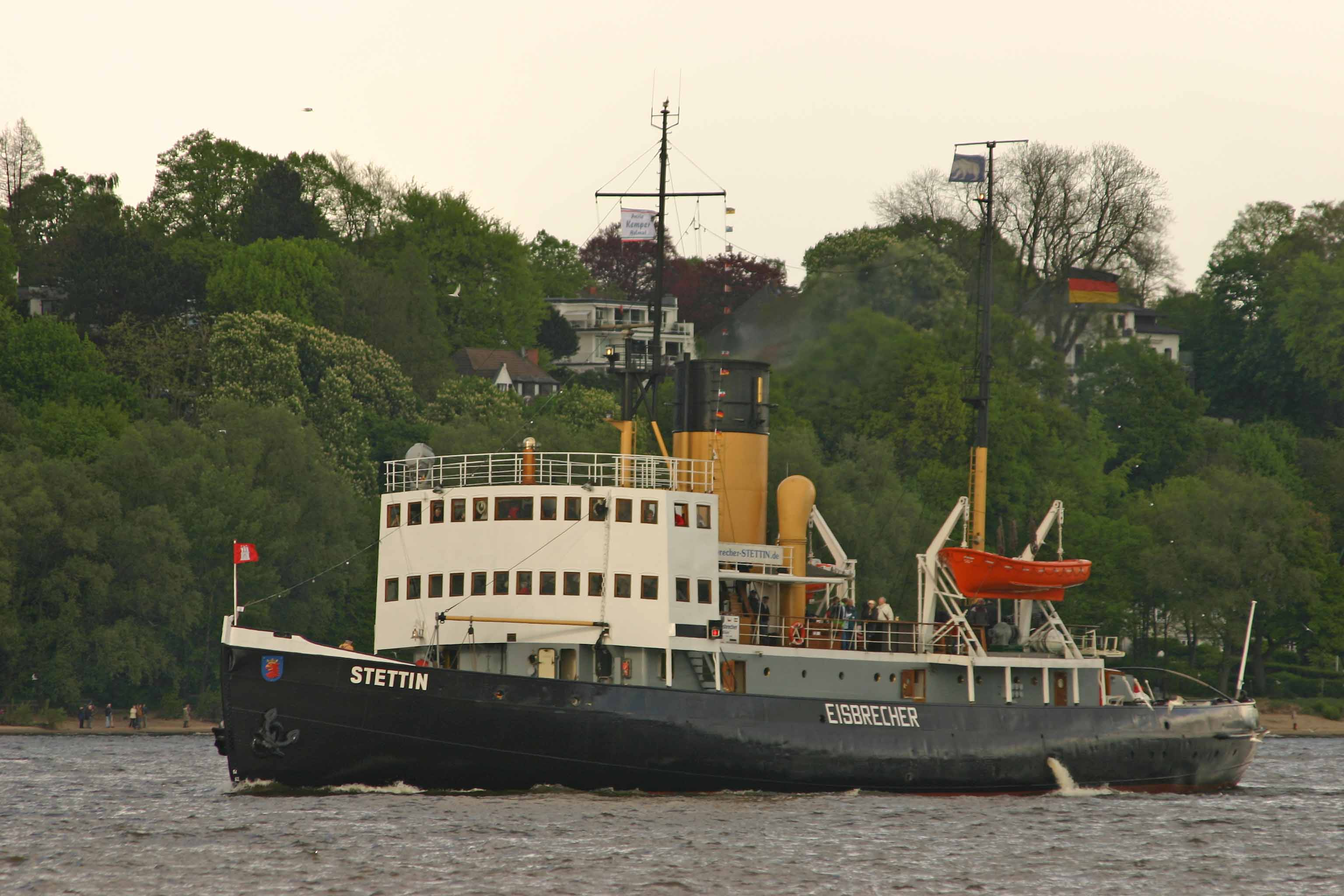

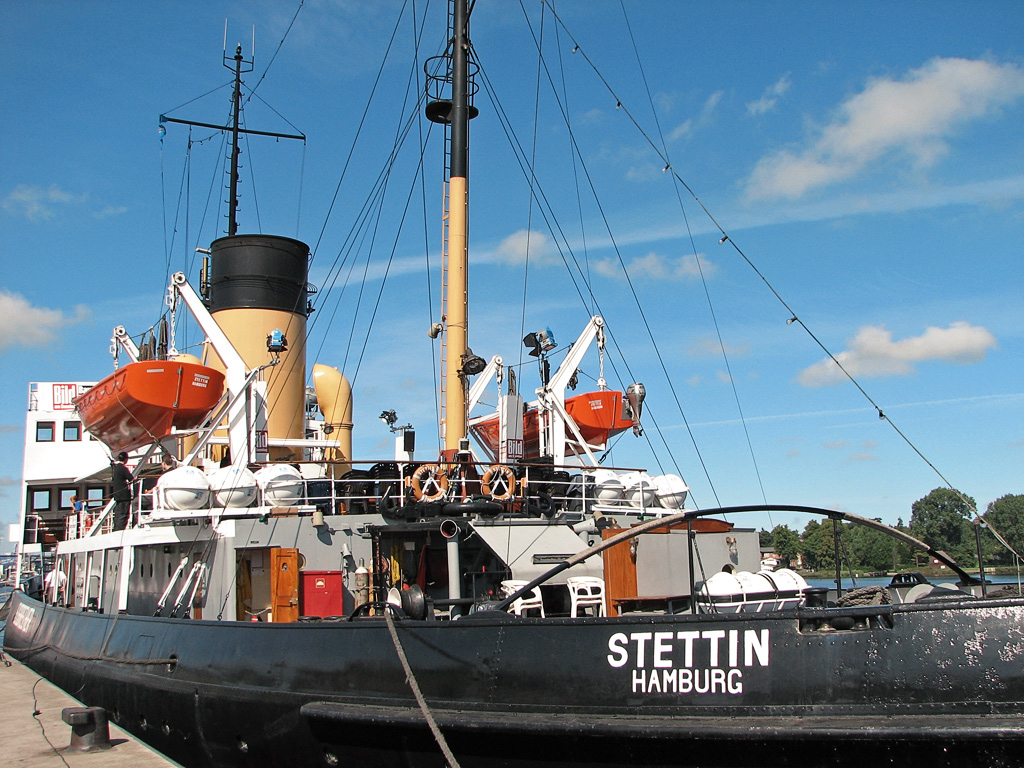

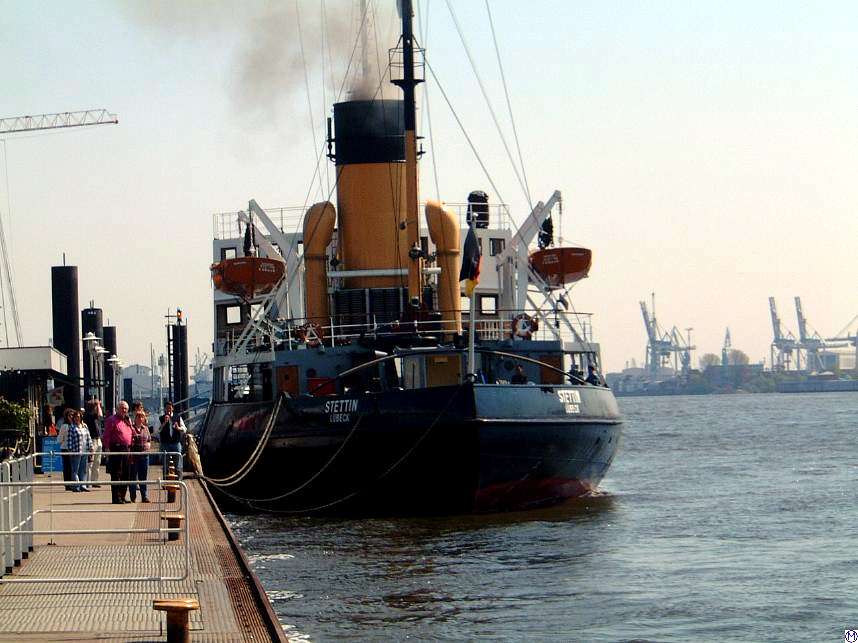

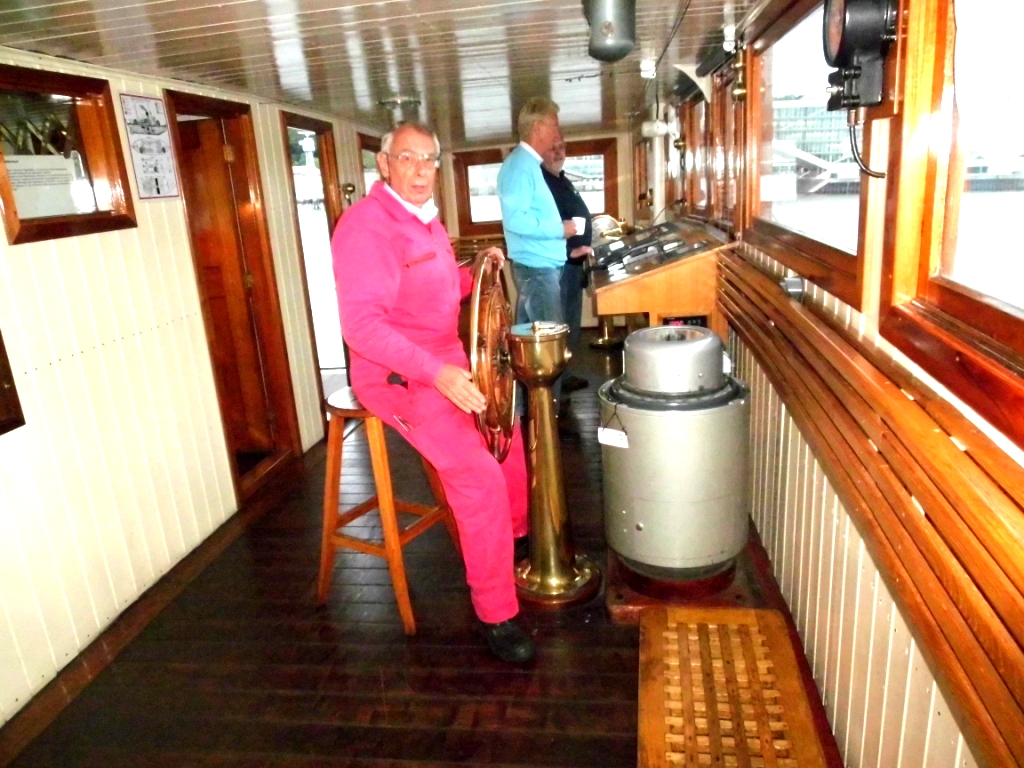

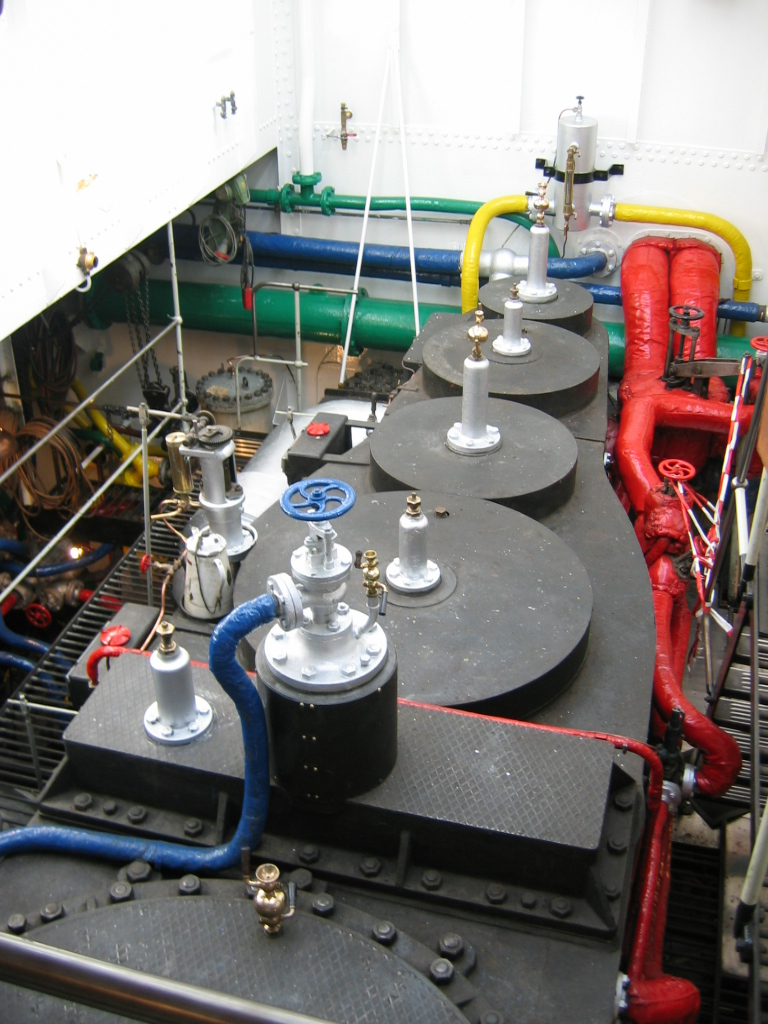

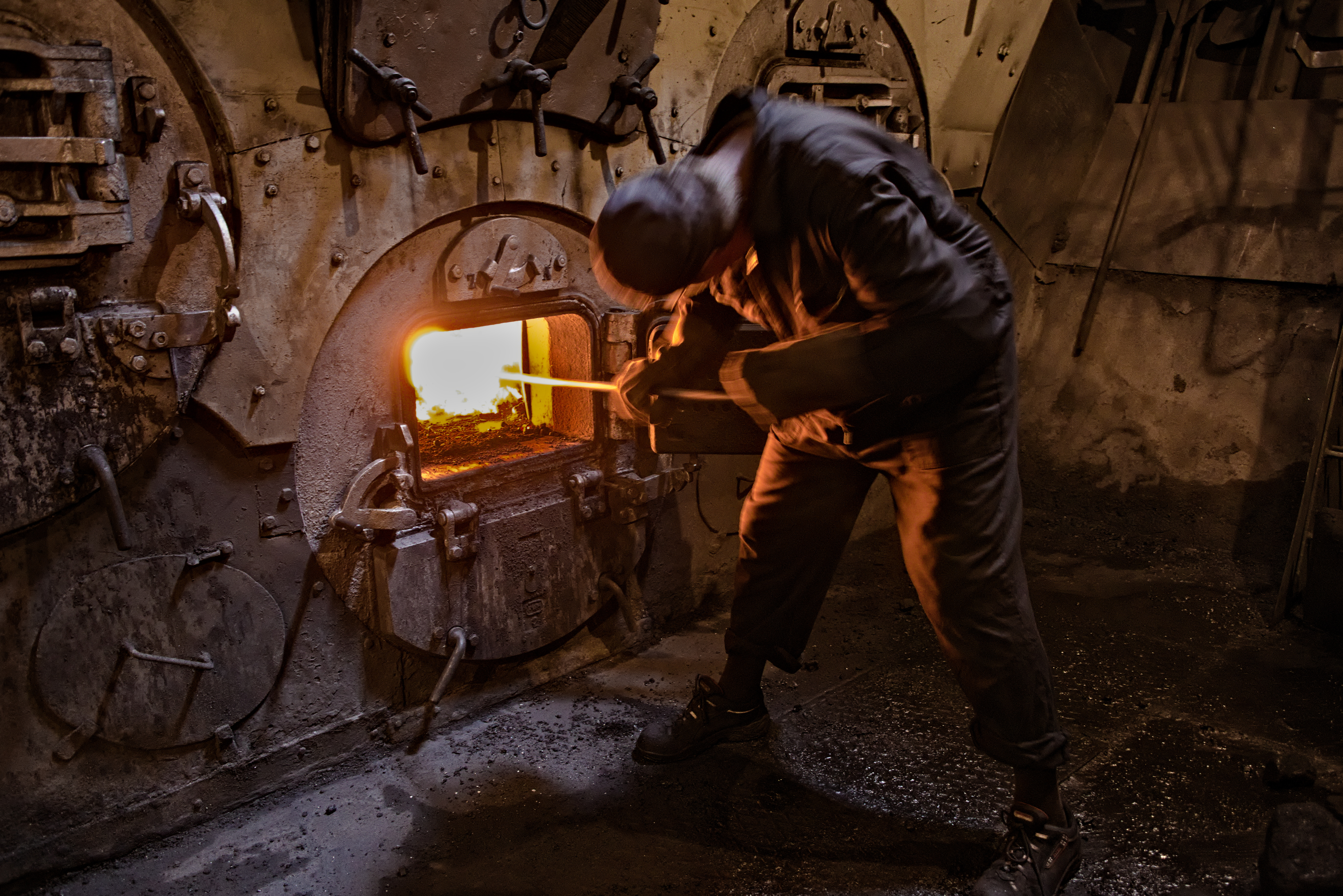

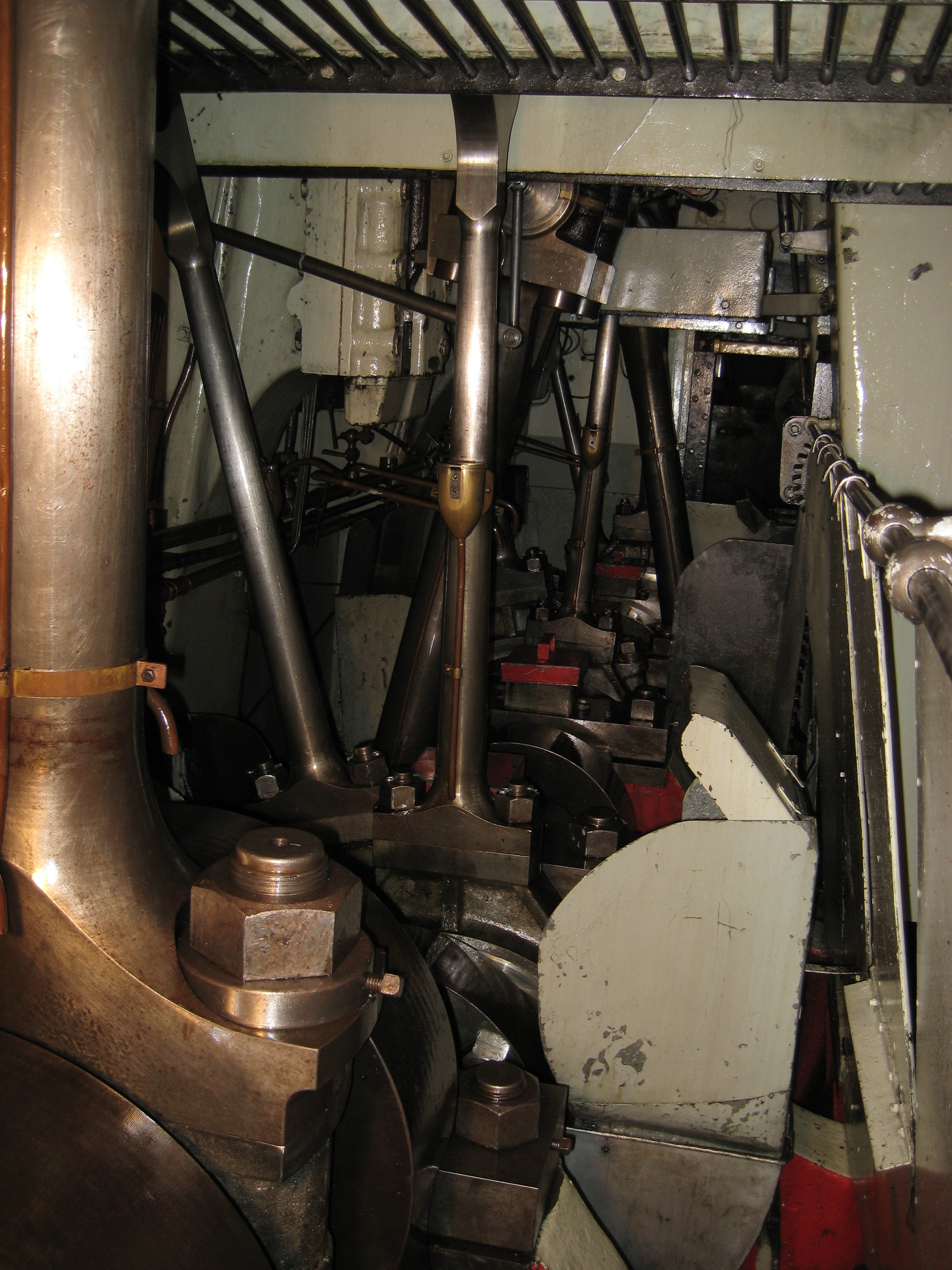

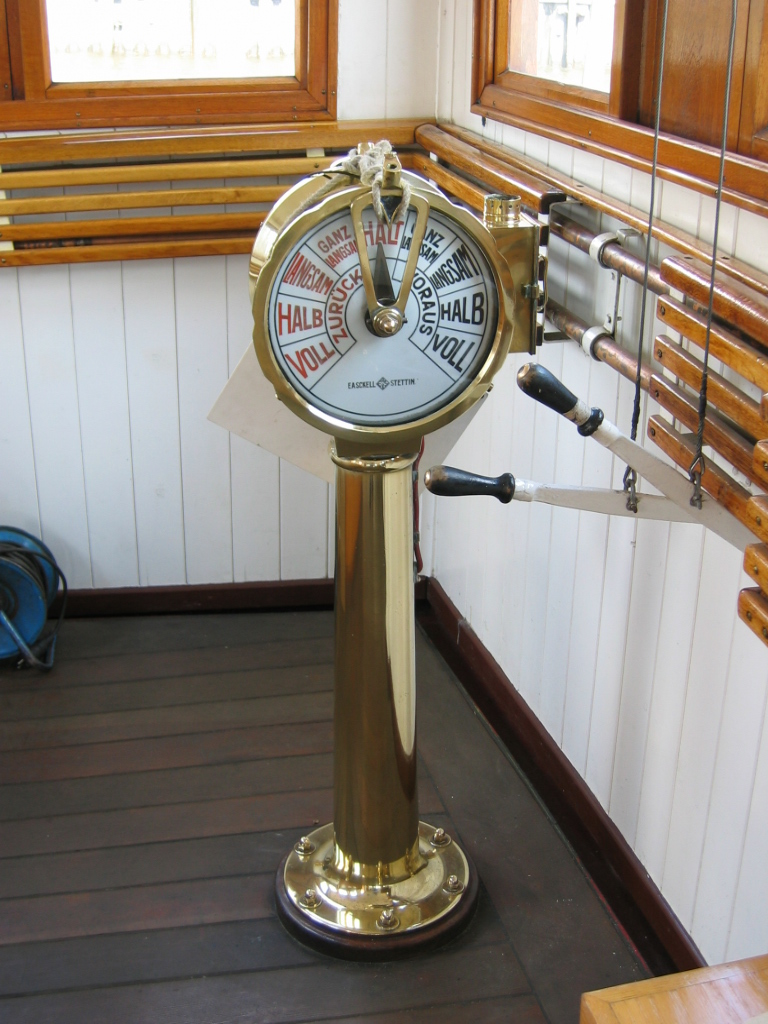

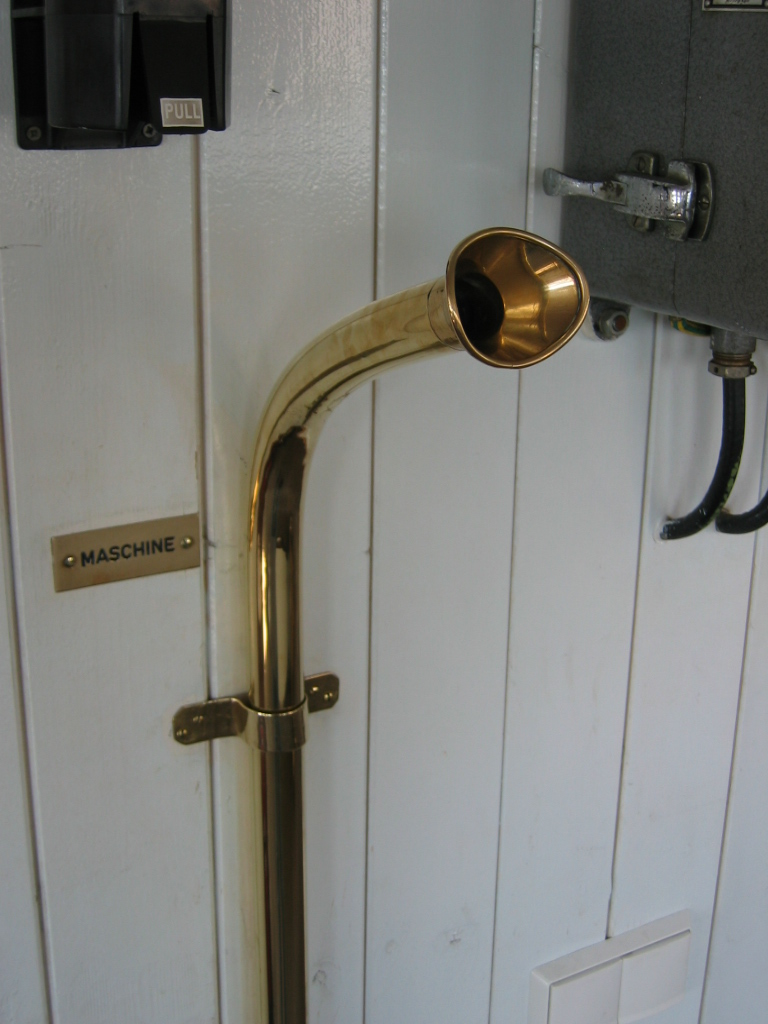

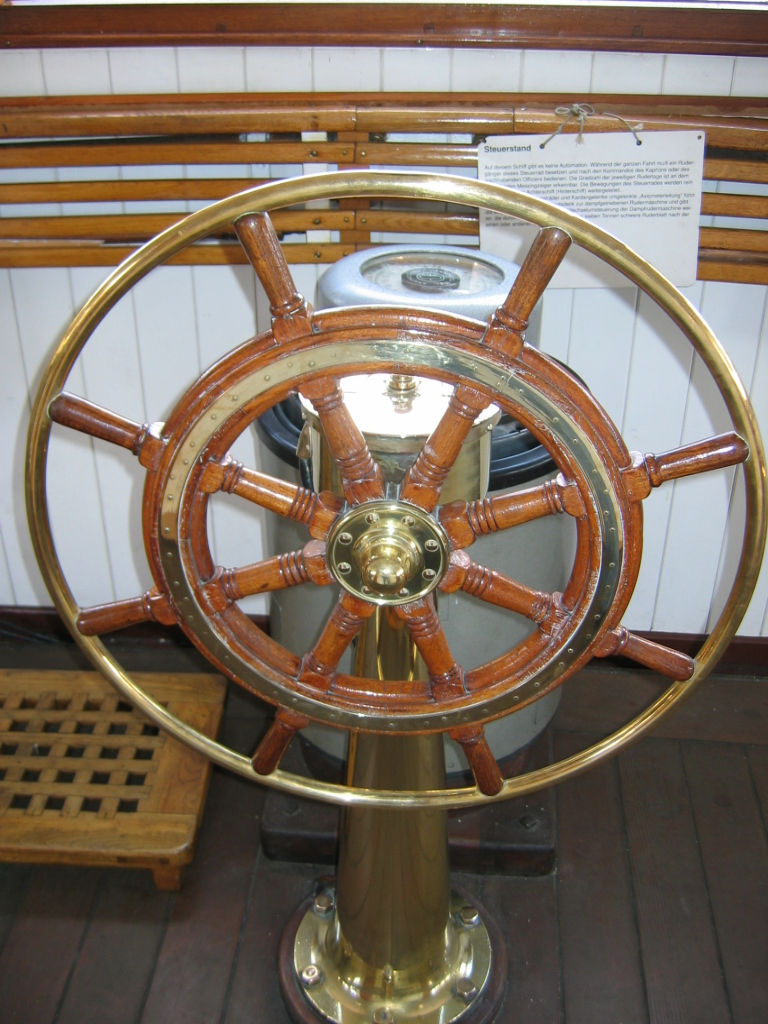

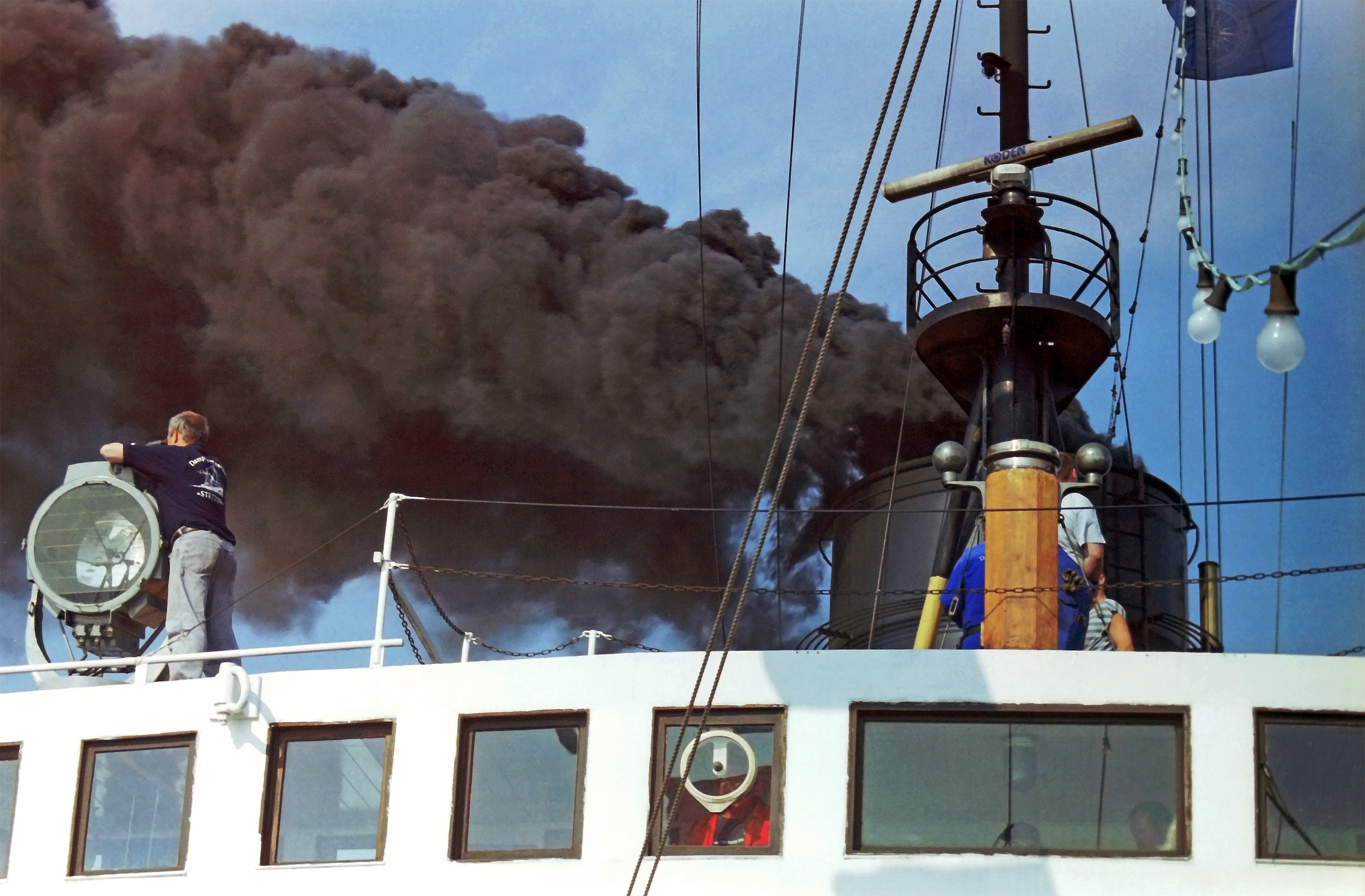
