= USS Bath (AK-4) =

Cargo ship of the United States Navy

History

Netherlands
- Name: Andromeda
- Namesake: Andromeda (mythology)
- Owner: Argo Steamship Co., Holland
- Builder: Oderwerke, Stettin, German Empire
- Laid down: 1913
- Completed: 1913
- Fate: Seized at New Orleans, Louisiana, 6 April 1917
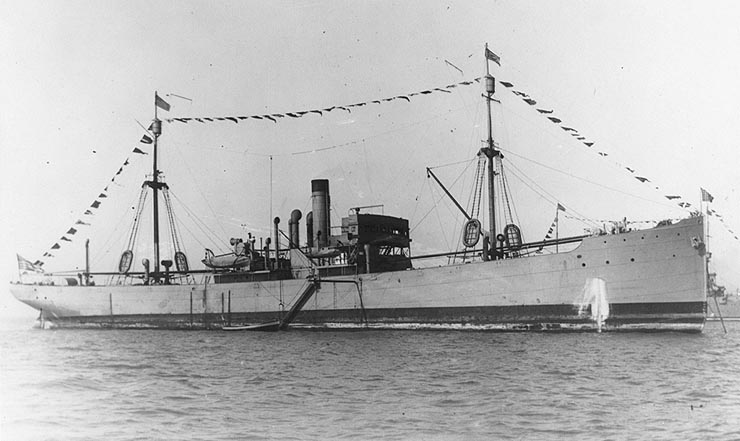
- USS Bath (AK-4) At anchor and dressed with flags, circa 1920.

United States
- Name: Bath
- Namesake: Bath, Maine
- Acquired: 6 April 1917
- Commissioned: 30 July 1917, as USS Bath (ID-1997)
- Decommissioned: 9 May 1922
- Reclassified: 17 July 1920, as AK-4
- Stricken: 30 September 1925
- Identification: Hull symbol: ID-1997; Hull symbol: AK-4
- Fate: Sold to S. R. Paterno of Manila, 2 January 1926, wrecked 1955

General characteristics
- Displacement: 2,250 t (2,210 long tons) (standard); 6,782 t (6,675 long tons) (full load)
- Length: 344 ft (105 m)
- Beam: 46 ft 2 in (14.07 m)
- Draught: 20 ft 2 in (6.15 m)
- Speed: 10 knots (19 km/h; 12 mph)
- Complement: 99
- Armament: 3 × 3 in (76 mm)/23-caliber guns; 2 × machine guns

USS Bath (OD-1997/AK-4) was a cargo ship acquired by the U.S. Navy for service in World War I.

== Construction and career ==
=== Early career and seizure ===
The ship was launched in 1913 by Oderwerke Stettiner of Stettin, Germany, as the Dutch freighter SS Andromeda. The vessel was seized by United States customs officials at New Orleans, Louisiana on 6 April 1917 and transferred to the United States Navy in May. The Navy renamed the ship Bath on 6 June 1917 and was given the hull number ID-1997. Bath was commissioned on 30 July 1917.

=== United States naval service ===
Bath left New Orleans on 2 August 1917 to join a convoy at Boston, Massachusetts for a transatlantic crossing, and arrived at Brest, France on 18 September 1917. She was placed in Special Service with Train, Atlantic Fleet, and carried cargo between England and France until February 1918 when she returned to the United States. Bath was assigned to the Naval Overseas Transportation Service in March 1918 and carried cargo between the United States and Europe. Between February 1919 and July 1921 she carried cargo between the east and west coasts of the United States and to the Caribbean. In 1920, the vessel received a new hull number, AK-4.

On 14 July 1921 Bath was assigned to the Asiatic Fleet and arrived at Cavite, Philippines, on 6 January 1922. She remained with the Asiatic Fleet until decommissioned at Cavite on 9 May 1922. She was sold on 2 January 1926. She was wrecked in 1955.

== Military awards and honors ==
Her crew members were eligible for the following medal:

- World War I Victory Medal (with Transport clasp)
