= German submarine U-821 =

German World War II submarine

History

Nazi Germany
- Name: U-821
- Ordered: 20 January 1941
- Builder: Oderwerke, Stettin
- Yard number: 821
- Laid down: 2 October 1941
- Launched: 26 June 1943
- Commissioned: 11 October 1943
- Fate: Sunk by aircraft on 10 June 1944

General characteristics
- Class & type: Type VIIC submarine
- Displacement: 769 tonnes (757 long tons) surfaced; 871 t (857 long tons) submerged
- Length: 67.10 m (220 ft 2 in) o/a; 50.50 m (165 ft 8 in) pressure hull
- Beam: 6.20 m (20 ft 4 in) o/a; 4.70 m (15 ft 5 in) pressure hull
- Height: 9.60 m (31 ft 6 in)
- Draught: 4.74 m (15 ft 7 in)
- Installed power: 2,800–3,200 PS (2,100–2,400 kW; 2,800–3,200 bhp) (diesels); 750 PS (550 kW; 740 shp) (electric)
- Propulsion: 2 shafts; 2 × diesel engines; 2 × electric motors
- Speed: 17.7 knots (32.8 km/h; 20.4 mph) surfaced; 7.6 knots (14.1 km/h; 8.7 mph) submerged
- Range: 8,500 nmi (15,700 km; 9,800 mi) at 10 knots (19 km/h; 12 mph) surfaced; 80 nmi (150 km; 92 mi) at 4 knots (7.4 km/h; 4.6 mph) submerged
- Test depth: 230 m (750 ft); Crush depth: 250–295 m (820–968 ft)
- Complement: 4 officers, 40–56 enlisted
- Armament: 5 × 53.3 cm (21 in) torpedo tubes (four bow, one stern); 14 × torpedoes or 26 TMA mines; 1 × 3.7 cm (1.5 in) Flak M42 AA gun; 2 × twin 2 cm (0.79 in) C/30 anti-aircraft guns

Service record
- Part of: 4th U-boat Flotilla; 11 October – 1 November 1943; 24th U-boat Flotilla; 1 November – 31 December 1943; 4th U-boat Flotilla; 1 January – 29 February 1944; 1st U-boat Flotilla; 1 March – 10 June 1944
- Identification codes: M 52 715
- Commanders: Lt.z.S. Ludwig Fabricius; 11 October – 1 December 1943; Oblt.z.S. Ernst Fischer; 2 – 31 December 1943; Oblt.z.S. Ulrich Knackfuß; 1 January – 10 June 1944
- Operations: 2 patrols: 1st patrol: 19 March – 12 April 1944; 2nd patrol: 6 – 10 June 1944
- Victories: None

German submarine U-821 was a short-lived Type VIIC U-boat of Nazi Germany's Kriegsmarine, built by Oderwerke in Stettin during World War II for service in the Battle of the Atlantic. She only participated in two brief combat patrols, one of which ended after four days when she was sunk by allied aircraft. U-821 was built in Stettin at a small shipyard, and thus took eighteen months to complete, being ready by October 1943. The boat was of the VIIC Type, which possessed long range cruising capabilities as well as five torpedo tubes.

== Design ==
German Type VIIC submarines were preceded by the shorter Type VIIB submarines. U-821 had a displacement of 769 tonnes (757 long tons) when at the surface and 871 tonnes (857 long tons) while submerged. She had a total length of 67.10 m (220 ft 2 in), a pressure hull length of 50.50 m (165 ft 8 in), a beam of 6.20 m (20 ft 4 in), a height of 9.60 m (31 ft 6 in), and a draught of 4.74 m (15 ft 7 in). The submarine was powered by two Germaniawerft F46 four-stroke, six-cylinder supercharged diesel engines producing a total of 2,800 to 3,200 metric horsepower (2,060 to 2,350 kW; 2,760 to 3,160 shp) for use while surfaced, two Brown, Boveri & Cie GG UB 720/8 double-acting electric motors producing a total of 750 metric horsepower (550 kW; 740 shp) for use while submerged. She had two shafts and two 1.23 m (4 ft) propellers. The boat was capable of operating at depths of up to 230 metres (750 ft).

The submarine had a maximum surface speed of 17.7 knots (32.8 km/h; 20.4 mph) and a maximum submerged speed of 7.6 knots (14.1 km/h; 8.7 mph). When submerged, the boat could operate for 80 nautical miles (150 km; 92 mi) at 4 knots (7.4 km/h; 4.6 mph); when surfaced, she could travel 8,500 nautical miles (15,700 km; 9,800 mi) at 10 knots (19 km/h; 12 mph). U-821 was fitted with five 53.3 cm (21 in) torpedo tubes (four fitted at the bow and one at the stern), fourteen torpedoes, one 3.7 cm (1.5 in) Flak M42 and two twin 2 cm (0.79 in) C/30 anti-aircraft guns. The boat had a complement of between forty-four and sixty.

== Service history ==
=== War patrols ===
Following her sea trials and warming-up period, U-821 departed Bergen, Norway on 19 March 1944 for her first war patrol, during which she spent 24 fruitless days in the North Atlantic before returning to Brest, France for resupply. Her second patrol was more eventful, as just four days out from Brest and not far from Ushant, Royal Air Force aircraft spotted and attacked the U-boat on the surface. Her captain made the decision to battle it out rather than dive, and engaged in a running firefight with three Mosquito aircraft of 248 Squadron and a large Consolidated Liberator bomber of 206 Squadron. One Mosquito was shot down in the clash, but rockets and depth charges took their toll on the submarine which soon sank, taking with her 50 sailors, in position 48°31′N 05°11′W. One survivor was pulled from the sea by small German naval units a few hours later.

The sinking was filmed by gun camera footage on board the attacking aircraft.

== Bibliography ==
- Busch, Rainer; Röll, Hans-Joachim (1999). German U-boat commanders of World War II : a biographical dictionary. Translated by Brooks, Geoffrey. London, Annapolis, Md: Greenhill Books, Naval Institute Press. ISBN 1-55750-186-6.
- Busch, Rainer; Röll, Hans-Joachim (1999). Der U-Boot-Krieg, 1939-1945: Deutsche U-Boot-Verluste von September 1939 bis Mai 1945 [German U-boat losses from September 1939 to May 1945] (in German). Vol. IV. Hamburg, Berlin, Bonn: Mittler. ISBN 3-8132-0514-2.
- Gröner, Eric; Jung, Dieter; Maass, Martin (1991). German Warships 1815-1945: U-boats and Mine Warfare Vessels. Vol. 2. Translated by Thomas, Keith; Magowan, Rachel. London: Conway Maritime Press. ISBN 0-85177-593-4.
- Sharpe, Peter (1998). U-Boat Fact File. Great Britain: Midland Publishing. ISBN 1-85780-072-9.
