= Seedienst Ostpreußen =

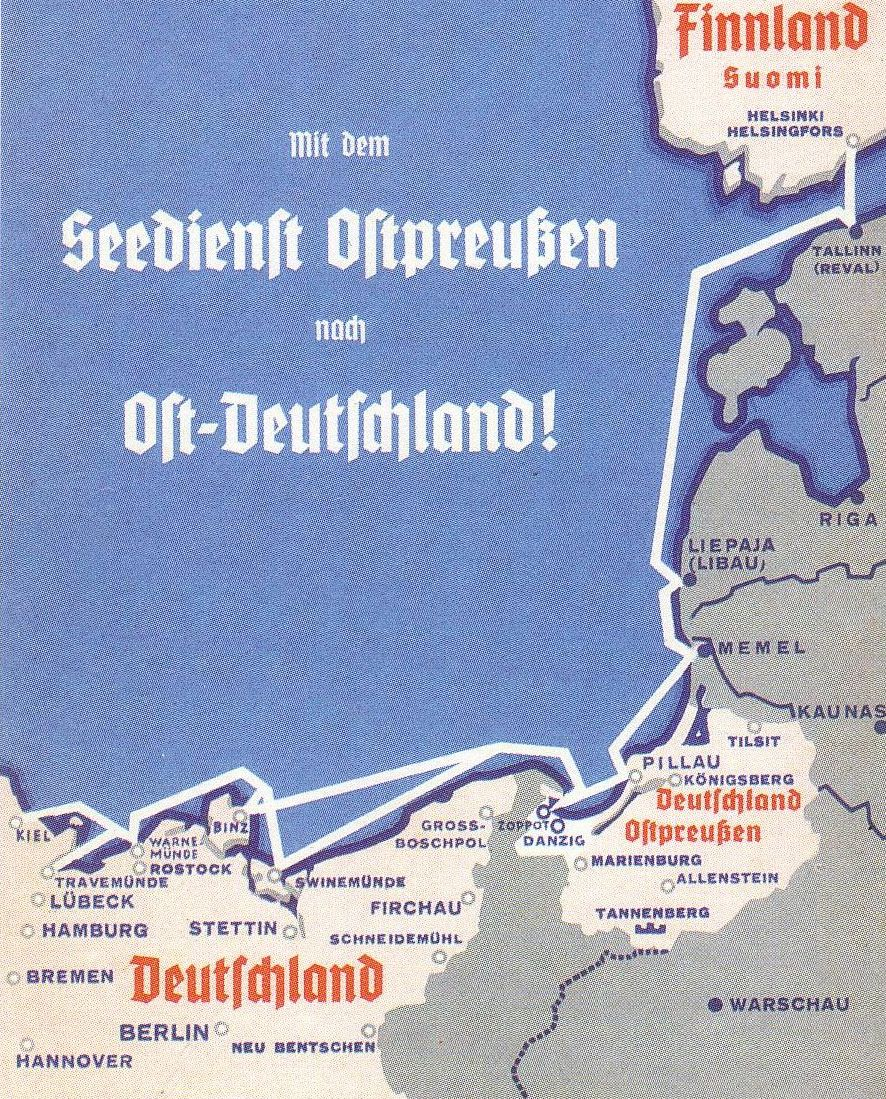
Seedienst-Poster (1936)

The Seedienst Ostpreußen or Sea Service East Prussia was a ferry connection between the German provinces of Pomerania and, later, Schleswig-Holstein and the German exclave of East Prussia from 1920 to 1939.

== Political background ==
After the end of World War I, Poland re-obtained access to the Baltic Sea by the area sometimes called the Polish Corridor; the territory had been an integral part of Poland prior to 1772, when it was annexed by the Kingdom of Prussia in the first partition of Poland. The corridor separated the Weimar Republic from the province of East Prussia. Because of this separation, the German Ministry for Transport established the Seedienst Ostpreußen to provide a ferry connection to the German exclave.

== Ships and routes ==
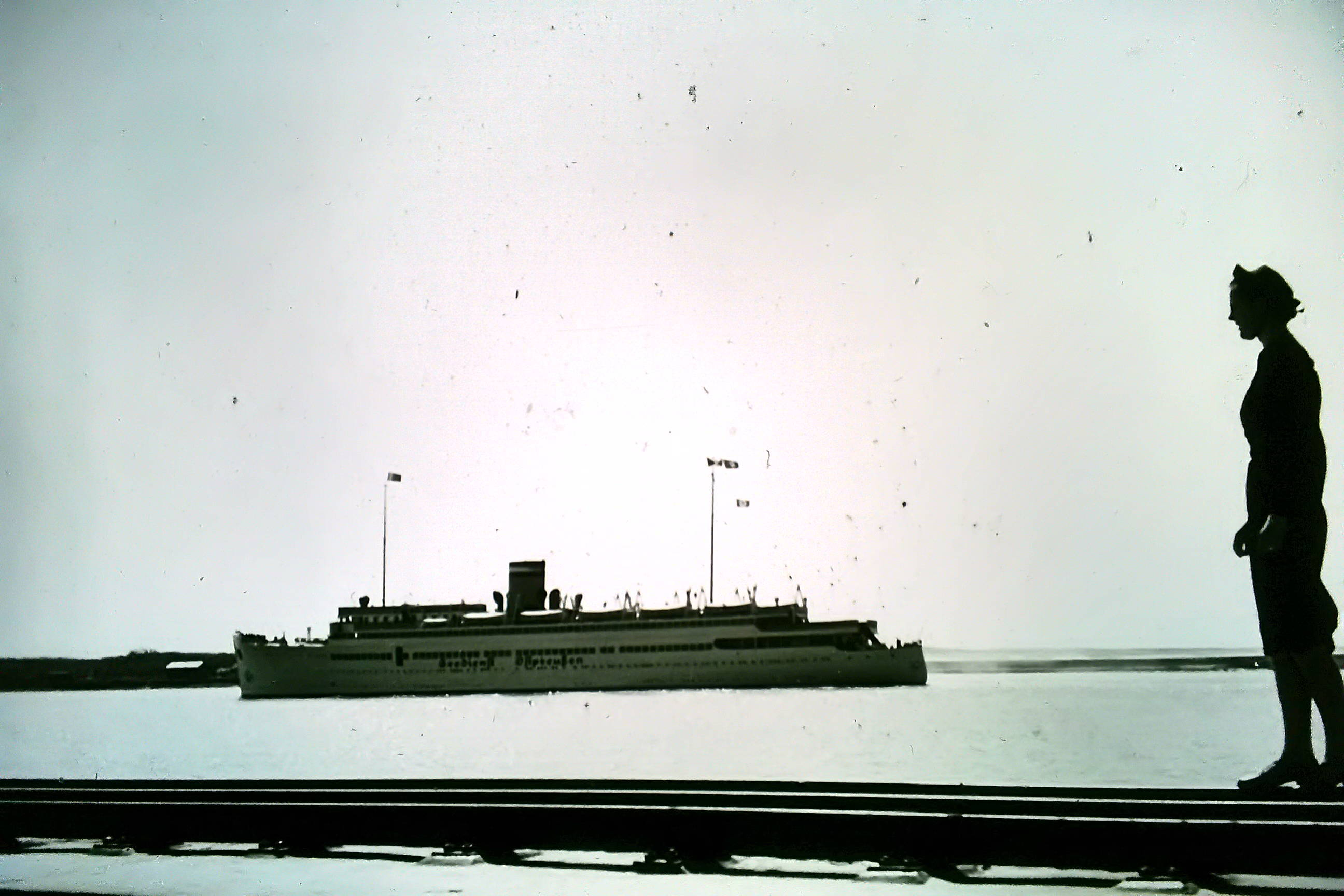
A ship of the "Seedienst Ostpreußen"

On 30 January 1920 the first HAPAG ship "Hörnum" travelled from Swinemünde to Pillau on behalf of the German Government. Other ships were provided by North German Lloyd and the Shipping Company Braeunlich. At first these ships left Swinemünde four times a week, later once a day in Summer and 4–5 times a week in Winter, also harbouring in Zoppot and Stolpmünde. The route subsequently expanded to Memel (Klaipėda) (1927) and Liepāja (1930) in Lithuania and Latvia respectively, and Lübeck-Travemünde (1933) and Kiel (1934) in Schleswig-Holstein. Due to the increasing distances the original ships were no longer able to meet the requirements of the route and in 1926 the "Preussen" (of Shipping Company Braeunlich) and the Hansestadt Danzig (of North German Lloyd) went into service, followed by "Tannenberg" (of HAPAG) in 1935. The projected "Marienburg" wasn't finished after the beginning of World War II, but completed in 1950 in Wismar as a reparation for the Soviet Union, later running as „Ленсовет" (Lensoviet) and „Абхазия" (Abchasia) on the Black Sea and ultimately scrapped in 1980 at Barcelona.

The Sea Service East Prussia was abandoned after Germany invaded Poland in 1939.

== Literature ==
- Claus Rothe: Deutsche Seebäderschiffe. 1830 bis 1939. In: Bibliothek der Schiffstypen. transpress Verlag für Verkehrswesen, Berlin 1989, ISBN 3-344-00393-3
