= German trawler V 307 Württemberg =

History
- Name: Hans Wriedt (1929–33); Württemberg (1933–57)
- Owner: Nordsee Deutsche Hochseefischerei Bremen-Cuxhaven AG (1929–39); Kriegsmarine (1939–45); Nordsee Deutsche Hochseefischerei Bremen-Cuxhaven AG (1945–57)
- Port of registry: (Weimar Republic) Nordenham, Germany (1930–33); (Nazi Germany) Nordenham, Germany (1933–39); Kriegsmarine (1939–45); Nordenham, Allied-occupied Germany (1945–49); Nordenham, West Germany (1949–57)
- Builder: J. Frerichs & Co, AG
- Yard number: 506
- Launched: 26 November 1929
- Completed: 19 January 1930
- Identification: Code Letters NKHM (1930–34); Fishing boat registration ON 119 (1930–34); Code Letters DNNZ (1934–57); Fishing boat registration PG 470 (1934–39); Pennant Number V 307 (1939–45); Fishing boat registration PG 470 (1945–57)
- Fate: Scrapped 1957

General characteristics
- Class & type: Fishing trawler (1929–39, 1945–57); Vorpostenboot (1939–45)
- Tonnage: 374 GRT, 141 NRT
- Length: 53.54 m (175 ft 8 in)
- Beam: 7.70 m (25 ft 3 in)
- Draught: 3.73 m (12 ft 3 in)
- Depth: 4.30 m (14 ft 1 in)
- Installed power: Triple expansion steam engine, 89nhp
- Propulsion: Single screw propeller
- Speed: 11 knots (20 km/h)

V 307 Württemberg was a German fishing trawler that was requisitioned in the Second World War for use as a vorpostenboot. She was built in 1929 as Hans Wriedt and was renamed in 1934. She was returned to her owners post-war and was scrapped in 1957.

== Description ==
The ship was 53.54 metres (175 ft 8 in) long, with a beam of 7.70 metres (25 ft 3 in). She had a depth of 3.73 metres (12 ft 3 in) and a draught of 4.30 metres (14 ft 1 in). She was assessed at 374 GRT, 141 NRT. She was powered by a triple expansion steam engine, which had cylinders of 33 centimetres (13 in), 55 centimetres (21 1/2 in) and 80 centimetres (31 1/2 in) diameter by 60 centimetres (23 5/8 in) stroke. The engine was made by Deschimag Seebeckwerft, Wesermünde. It was rated at 89nhp. The engine powered a single screw propeller driven via a geared low pressure turbine, double reduction gearing and a hydraulic coupling. It could propel the ship at 11 knots (20 km/h).

== History ==
Hans Wriedt was built as yard number 506 by J. Frerichs & Co, AG., Einswarden, Germany for the Nordsee Deutsche Hochseefischerei Bremen-Cuxhaven AG. She was launched on 26 November 1929 and completed on 19 January 1930. The Code Letters QVNG were allocated, as was the fishing boat registration ON 119. On 21 February 1932 the German fishing trawler Nordland was driven ashore at "Leiknes Gisund", Norway. Hans Wriedt and Lappland went to her assistance. On 29 April 1933, she was renamed Württemberg. On 17 October 1934 her registration was changed to PG 479. In 1934, her Code Letters were changed to DNNZ.

On 25 September 1939, Württemberg was requisitioned by the Kriegsmarine for use as a Vorpostenboot. She was allocated to 3 Vorpostenflotille as V 307 ''Württemberg. She survived the war and was returned to her owners on 18 August 1945. She was scrapped in July 1957 by W. Ritscher, Hamburg, West Germany.

== Sources ==
- Gröner, Erich (1993). Die deutschen Kriegsschiffe 1815-1945 (in German). Vol. 8/I: Flußfahrzeuge, Ujäger, Vorpostenboote, Hilfsminensucher, Küstenschutzverbände (Teil 1). Koblenz: Bernard & Graefe. ISBN 3-7637-4807-5.
