= AK3L1 =

Protein-coding gene in humans

AK4
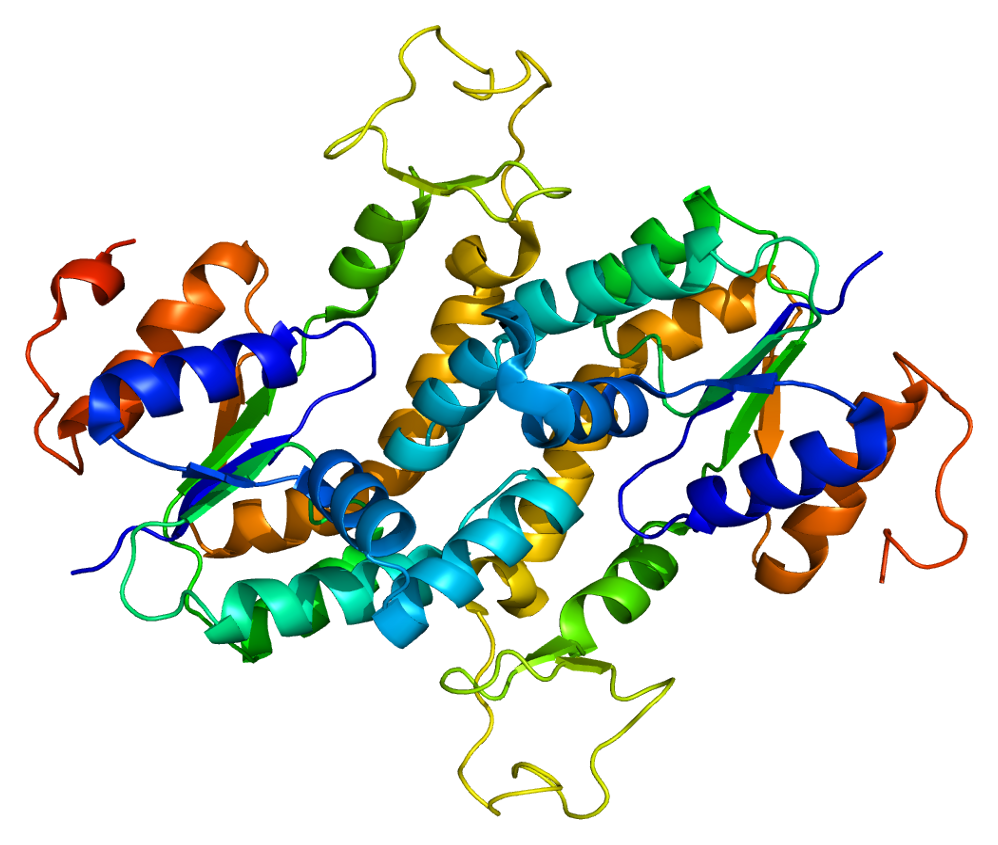

Identifiers
- Aliases: AK4, AK 4, AK3, AK3L1, AK3L2, adenylate kinase 4
- External IDs: OMIM: 103030; MGI: 87979; GeneCards: AK4
Available structures
PDB	Ortholog search: PDBe RCSB
PDB	List of PDB id codes 2AR7, 2BBW, 3NDP
Enzyme activity
EC #	BRENDA	ExPASy	KEGG	MetaCyc
2.7.4.3	↗	↗	↗	↗
2.7.4.4	↗	↗	↗	↗
2.7.4.6	↗	↗	↗	↗

Gene location (Human)
Chr.	Chromosome 1 (human)
Band	1p31.3	Start	65,147,549 bp
Band	1p31.3	End	65,232,145 bp

Gene location (Mouse)
Chr.	Chromosome 4 (mouse)
Band	4 C6|4 46.84 cM	Start	101,276,474 bp
Band	4 C6|4 46.84 cM	End	101,324,192 bp
RNA expression pattern
Bgee	Human / Mouse (ortholog); Top expressed in: renal medulla; right ventricle; skin of thigh; pericardium; skin of hip; human kidney; saphenous vein; lactiferous duct; internal globus pallidus; tail of epididymis / Top expressed in: cumulus cell; zygote; secondary oocyte; right kidney; human kidney; proximal tubule; cerebellar vermis; tail of embryo; lobe of cerebellum; primary oocyte; More reference expression data
BioGPS	n/a
Gene ontology
Molecular function	transferase activity; nucleotide binding; nucleoside triphosphate adenylate kinase activity; GTP binding; phosphotransferase activity, phosphate group as acceptor; kinase activity; nucleobase-containing compound kinase activity; adenylate kinase activity; ATP binding; nucleoside monophosphate kinase activity; nucleoside diphosphate kinase activity; protein binding
Cellular component	mitochondrial matrix; mitochondrion
Biological process	nucleobase-containing small molecule interconversion; phosphorylation; nucleoside diphosphate phosphorylation; brain development; nucleoside triphosphate biosynthetic process; liver development; nucleobase-containing compound metabolic process; nucleoside monophosphate phosphorylation; AMP metabolic process; ATP metabolic process; GTP metabolic process; ADP biosynthetic process; regulation of oxidative phosphorylation; cellular response to hypoxia; regulation of ATP biosynthetic process
Sources:Amigo / QuickGO
Orthologs
Databases	NCBI: entry; OMA: entry
Species	Human	Mouse
Entrez	205	11639
Ensembl	ENSG00000162433	ENSMUSG00000028527
UniProt	P27144	Q9WUR9
RefSeq (mRNA)	NM_203464; NM_001005353; NM_013410; NM_001330616	NM_001177602; NM_001177604; NM_001177605; NM_009647
RefSeq (protein)	NP_001005353; NP_001317545; NP_037542; NP_982289	NP_001171073; NP_001171075; NP_001171076; NP_033777
Location (UCSC)	Chr 1: 65.15 – 65.23 Mb	Chr 4: 101.28 – 101.32 Mb
PubMed search
- Wikidata
View/Edit Human	View/Edit Mouse

Adenylate kinase isoenzyme 4, mitochondrial is an enzyme that in humans is encoded by the AK4 gene.

This gene encodes a member of the adenylate kinase family of enzymes. The encoded protein is localized to the mitochondrial matrix. Adenylate kinases regulate the adenine and guanine nucleotide compositions within a cell by catalyzing the reversible transfer of phosphate group among these nucleotides. Five isozymes of adenylate kinase have been identified in vertebrates. Expression of these isozymes is tissue-specific and developmentally regulated. A pseudogene for this gene has been located on chromosome 17. Three transcript variants encoding the same protein have been identified for this gene. Sequence alignment suggests that the gene defined by NM_013410, NM_203464, and NM_001005353 is located on chromosome 1. Expression of AK4 may regulate global cellular ATP levels and modulate the AMPK signaling pathway.
