= SMS Württemberg =

There have been two ships in the German Imperial Navy named SMS Württemberg:

- SMS Württemberg (1878) - A Sachsen-class ironclad launched in 1878.
- SMS Württemberg (1917) - A Bayern-class battleship launched in 1917, but never completed.
