= Japanese submarine Ro-27 =

Kaichu-type submarine

History

Japan
- Name: Submarine No. 58
- Builder: Yokosuka Naval Arsenal, Yokosuka, Japan
- Laid down: 16 July 1921
- Launched: 22 July 1922
- Completed: 13 July 1924
- Commissioned: 13 July 1924
- Renamed: Ro-27 on 1 November 1924
- Decommissioned: 10 December 1937
- Stricken: 1 April 1940
- Renamed: Heisan No. 7 on 1 April 1940
- Fate: Hulked 1 April 1940; Scrapping completed October 1947

General characteristics
- Class & type: Kaichū type submarine (K4 subclass)
- Displacement: 762 tonnes (750 long tons) surfaced; 1,097 tonnes (1,080 long tons) submerged
- Length: 74.22 m (243 ft 6 in) overall
- Beam: 6.12 m (20 ft 1 in)
- Draft: 3.73 m (12 ft 3 in)
- Installed power: 2,900 bhp (2,200 kW) (diesel); 1,200 hp (890 kW) (electric motor)
- Propulsion: Diesel-electric; 2 × Sulzer Mark II diesel engine, 75 tons fuel; 2 × electric motor; 2 x shafts
- Speed: 16 knots (30 km/h; 18 mph) surfaced; 8.5 knots (15.7 km/h; 9.8 mph) submerged
- Range: 6,000 nmi (11,000 km; 6,900 mi) at 10 knots (19 km/h; 12 mph) surfaced; 85 nmi (157 km; 98 mi) at 4 knots (7.4 km/h; 4.6 mph) submerged
- Test depth: 45.7 m (150 ft)
- Crew: 46
- Armament: 4 × bow 533 mm (21 in) torpedo tubes; 8 x 6th Year Type torpedoes; 1 × 76.2 mm (3.00 in) gun

Ro-27, originally named Submarine No. 58, was an Imperial Japanese Navy Kaichū-Type submarine of the Kaichū IV subclass. She was in commission from 1924 to 1937.

== Design and description ==
The submarines of the Kaichu IV sub-class were an improved version of the preceding Kaichu III subclass, slightly larger, with heavier torpedoes, and with the deck gun mounted forward of the conning tower instead of aft of it. They displaced 762 tonnes (750 long tons) surfaced and 1,097 tonnes (1,080 long tons) submerged. The submarines were 74.22 meters (243 ft 6 in) long and had a beam of 6.12 meters (20 ft 1 in) and a draft of 3.73 meters (12 ft 3 in). They had a diving depth of 45.7 meters (150 ft).

For surface running, the submarines were powered by two 1,450-brake-horsepower (1,081 kW) Sulzer Mark II diesel engines, each driving one propeller shaft. When submerged each propeller was driven by a 600-horsepower (447 kW) electric motor. They could reach 16 knots (30 km/h; 18 mph) on the surface and 8.5 knots (15.7 km/h; 9.8 mph) underwater. On the surface, they had a range of 6,000 nautical miles (11,000 km; 6,900 mi) at 10 knots (19 km/h; 12 mph); submerged, they had a range of 85 nmi (157 km; 98 mi) at 4 knots (7.4 km/h; 4.6 mph).

The submarines were armed with four internal bow 533 mm (21.0 in) torpedo tubes and carried a total of eight torpedoes. They were also armed with a single 76.2 mm (3.00 in) deck gun.

== Construction and commissioning ==
Ro-27 was laid down as Submarine No. 58 on 16 July 1921 by the Yokosuka Naval Arsenal at Yokosuka, Japan. Launched on 22 July 1922, she was completed and commissioned on 13 July 1924.

== Service history ==
Upon commissioning, Submarine No. 58 was attached to the Kure Naval District, and on 20 August 1924 she was assigned to Submarine Division 14 in Submarine Squadron 2 in the 2nd Fleet. On 1 November 1924, Submarine No. 58 was renamed Ro-27.

Submarine Division 14 was reassigned to the Kure Naval District on 1 August 1925, and on 18 August 1925 began duty with the Kure Defense Division. This lasted until 1 December 1925, when the division returned to Submarine Squadron 2 in the 2nd Fleet. On 6 April 1926, Ro-27 collided with her sister ship Ro-28. Neither submarine suffered casualties.

On 1 December 1926, Submarine Division 14 was reassigned to the Kure Naval District, in which it remained until 1933. In the years that followed, the division had duty in the Kure Defense Division from 10 December 1928 to 1 December 1930 and from 1 October 1932 to 1 February 1933 and from 1 December 1933 to 15 November 1934 and underwent a refit in 1934.

Ro-27 was decommissioned on 10 December 1937 and placed in Fourth Reserve in the Kure Naval District. She was stricken from the Navy list on 1 April 1940. She served subsequently as the training hulk Heisan No. 7 at the submarine school at Kure, Japan. She was sold for scrap after World War II and scrapped at Iwakuni, Japan. Scrapping was completed in October 1947.
