= SS Ingrid Horn =

Three steamships of the Horn Line carried the name Ingrid Horn.

- SS Ingrid Horn (1902), sold in 1903, sank in 1917 after collision with SS Bergvik.
- SS Ingrid Horn (1922), sold in 1928, scrapped in 1960.
- SS Ingrid Horn (1928), sold in 1939, bombed and sunk in 1944.
