= HMS Nordland =

History
- Name: Nordland (1922–48); Tulipfield (1948–65)
- Owner: Deutsche Seefischerei (1922–27); Cuxhavener Hochseefischerei (1927–29); Nordsee Deutsche Hochseefischerei Bremen-Cuxhaven AG (1929–39); Kriegsmarine (1939–40); Royal Navy (1940–48); British Wheeler Process Ltd (1948–65)
- Port of registry: (Weimar Republic) Cuxhaven Germany (1922–33); (Nazi Germany) Cuxhaven, Germany (1933–39); Imperial German Navy (1939); (Nazi Germany) Cuxhaven (1939–40); Royal Navy (1940–48); Liverpool, United Kingdom (1948–65)
- Builder: Reiherstieg Schiffswerfte & Maschinenfabrik
- Way number: 543
- Launched: 3 October 1922
- Completed: 5 December 1922
- Commissioned: 4 September 1939 (Kriegsmarine); April 1940 (Royal Navy)
- Decommissioned: 4 September 1939 (Kriegsmarine); 1948 (Royal Navy)
- Identification: Fishing boat registration HC 105 (1922–39); Code Letters RDCG (1930–34); Code Letters DHRW (1934–40); Pennant Number V 401 (1939); Pennant Number V 411 (1939); Fishing boat registration PG 105 (1939–40); United Kingdom Official Number 167703 (1948–65); Code Letters MLZR (1948–65)
- Fate: Scrapped

General characteristics
- Class & type: Fishing boat (1922–39); Vorpostenboot (1939); Fishing boat (1939–40); Salvage vessel (1940–48); Sludge vessel (1948–65)
- Tonnage: 393 GRT, 152 NRT
- Length: 44.52 m (146 ft 1 in)
- Beam: 8.70 m (28 ft 7 in)
- Draught: 3.75 m (12 ft 4 in)
- Depth: 4.55 m (14 ft 11 in)
- Installed power: Triple expansion steam engine, 53nhp
- Propulsion: Single screw propeller
- Speed: 10 knots (19 km/h)

HMS Nordland was a salvage vessel that was built in 1922 as the German fishing trawler Nordland. She was requisitioned by the Kriegsmarine in 1939 but was returned to merchant service. She was captured by the Royal Navy in 1940 and taken in to service. Sold in 1948, she was used as a sludge carrier under the name Tulipfield. She was scrapped in 1965.

== Description ==
The ship was 44.52 metres (146 ft 1 in) long, with a beam of 8.70 metres (28 ft 7 in). She had a depth of 4.55 metres (14 ft 11 in) and a draught of 3.75 metres (12 ft 4 in). She was assessed at 393 GRT, 152 NRT. She was powered by a triple expansion steam engine, which had cylinders of 33 centimetres (13 in), 52 centimetres (20 1/2 in) and 81.8 centimetres (32 3/16 in) diameter by 64 centimetres (25 3/8 in) stroke. The engine was built by Reiherstieg Schiffswerfte & Maschinenfabrik, Hamburg, Germany. It was rated at 53nhp, and could propel the ship at 10 knots (19 km/h).

== History ==
Nordland was built in 1922 as yard number 543 by Reiherstieg Schiffswerfte & Maschinenfabrik for the Deutsche Seefischerei. She was launched on 3 October and completed on 5 December. The fishing boat registration HC 105 was allocated. In 1934, her Code Letters were changed to DHRW. On 21 March 1937, she was sold to the Nordsee Deutsche Hochseefischerei Bremen-Cuxhaven AG, Cuxhaven. By 1930, the Code Letters RDCG were allocated. On 21 February 1932, Nordland was driven ashore at "Leiknes Gisund", Norway. She was refloated the next day with assistance from the German trawlers Hans Wriedt and Lappland.

On 4 September 1939, Nordland was requisitioned by the Kriegsmarine for use as a vorpostenboot. She was allocated to 4 Vorpostenflotille as V 401 Nordland, but was redesignated V 411 Nordland three days later, but was released from service. She returned to use as a fishing trawler, with the registration PG 105. On 7 April 1940, she was captured by HMS Hostile off the Lofoten Islands, Norway (69°05′N 14°30′E). Nordland was one of three German trawlers captured about this time, the others being Blankenberg and Friesland. She was commissioned as HMS Nordland, and was used as a salvage vessel.

In 1948, HMS Nordland was sold to the British Wheeler Process Ltd, Liverpool, Lancashire, United Kingdom. She was renamed Tulipfield, and was used as a sludge vessel for oils with a flash point in excess of 150 °F (66 °C). Her port of registry was Liverpool. The United Kingdom Official Number 167703 and Code Letters MLZR were allocated. British Wheeler Process Ltd. was a company specialising in the cleaning of ships' tanks. Tulipfield was fitted with three tanks for the carrying of petroleum sludge. She was permitted to sail between British ports only. She was scrapped in October 1965 by de Smedt, Antwerp, Belgium.

== Sources ==
- Gröner, Erich (1993). Die deutschen Kriegsschiffe 1815-1945 (in German). Vol. 8/I: Flußfahrzeuge, Ujäger, Vorpostenboote, Hilfsminensucher, Küstenschutzverbände (Teil 1). Koblenz: Bernard & Graefe. ISBN 3-7637-4807-5.
