= Oderwerke =

Oderwerke AG
- Industry: Shipbuilding
- Founded: 1903
- Defunct: 1961
- Fate: Bankrupt
- Headquarters: Stettin, later Lübeck and Cologne, Germany
- Products: Merchant ships Warships; U-boats
- Number of employees: ~3600

Oderwerke or Stettiner Oderwerke was a German shipbuilding company, located in Stettin (now Szczecin, Poland).

== History ==
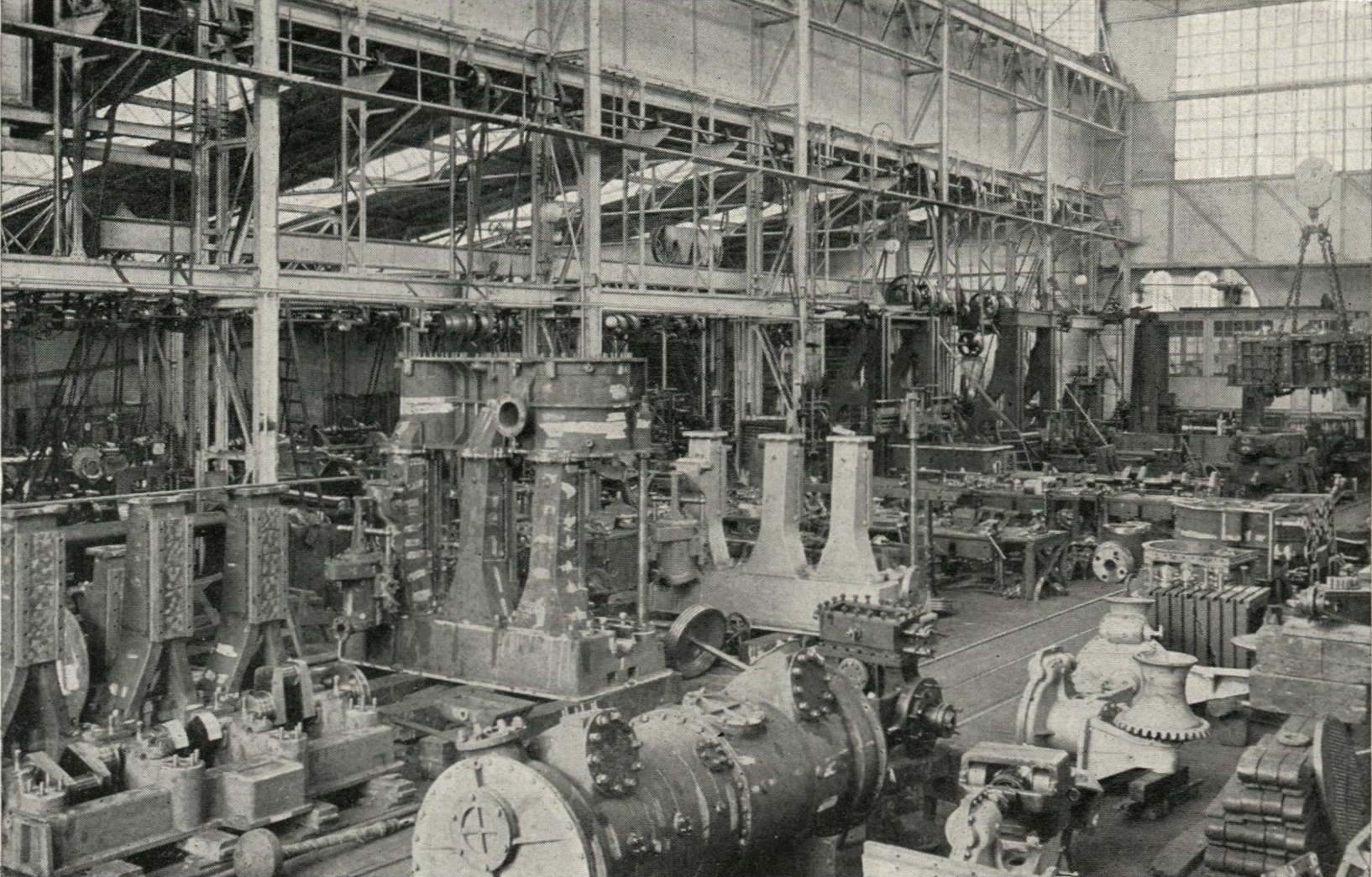
Stettiner Oderwerke: Mechanical engineering workshop (undated photograph)

Hertha (1905)

Oderwerke was founded on January 28, 1903, and built 154 ships prior to World War I.

During World War II Oderwerke built two German Type VII submarines for the Kriegsmarine, U-821 and U-822. The Polish resistance conducted espionage of the Oderwerke.

After the war, Oderwerke moved first to Lübeck in 1949 and later Cologne in 1950. The company was declared bankrupt in 1961 and closed.

== Ships built by Oderwerke (selection) ==
=== Civilian ships ===
- SS Hertha (1905)
- SS Preussen (1909)
- SS Stettin (1933)
- SS Isa (1936)
- Wal (1938)

=== Naval ships ===
==== Submarines (U-boats) ====
- 2 x Type VII submarines (1941–1944)
