= List of Empire ships (D) =

== Suffix beginning with D ==
=== Empire Dabchick ===
Empire Dabchick was a 6,089 GRT cargo ship which was built by Atlantic Corporation, Portsmouth, New Hampshire. Launched in 1919 as Kisnop for the United States Shipping Board (USSB). To MoWT in 1941 and renamed Empire Dabchick. Torpedoed and sunk on 3 December 1942 by U-183 at 43°00′N 58°17′W while a member of Convoy ONS 146.

=== Empire Dace ===
Empire Dace was a 716 GRT coaster which was built by Swan, Hunter & Wigham Richardson Ltd, Newcastle upon Tyne. Launched on 11 August 1942 and completed in September 1942. Requisitioned by the Royal Navy in July 1943. Struck a mine on 1 December 1944 and sank at Missolonghi, Greece.

=== Empire Daffodil ===
Empire Daffodil was a 394 GRT coaster which was built by Van Diepen Scheepswerf Gebroeders NV, Waterhuizen, Netherlands. Launched in 1940 as Caribe II for SG Hallstrom, Amsterdam. Requisitioned in 1940, to MoWT and renamed Empire Daffodil. Damaged on 9 July 1940 by enemy aircraft bombing. Taken to Portland, and later Southampton for repairs. Sold in 1946 to General Steam Navigation Co Ltd and renamed Greenfinch. Sold in 1966 to G M Moundreas & Bros, Greece and renamed Moira. Sold later that year to Orri Navigation Lines, Saudi Arabia and renamed Star of Medina.

=== Empire Damsel ===
Empire Damsel was a 784 GRT coastal tanker which was built by Grangemouth Dockyard Co Ltd, Grangemouth. Launched on 29 June 1942 and completed in October 1942. Sold in 1947 to the Bulk Oil Steamship Co Ltd, London and renamed Pass of Balmaha. Scrapped in March 1967 in Dalmuir, West Dunbartonshire.

=== Empire Darby ===
Empire Darby was a 203 GRT tug which was built by Cochrane & Sons Ltd, Selby. Launched on 8 January 1943 and completed in April 1943. To the Admiralty in 1947 and renamed Egerton. Sold in 1958 to HG Pounds, Portsmouth. Sold in 1961 to J D Irving Ltd, Canada and renamed Irving Beech. A new diesel engine was fitted in 1962. Ran aground on 1 December 1967 off New Waterford, Nova Scotia with tanker Lubrolake and a barge, all three ships were total losses.

=== Empire Daring ===
Empire Daring was a 7,059 GRT cargo ship which was built by William Hamilton & Co Ltd, Port Glasgow. Launched on 29 June 1943 and completed in August 1943. Sold in 1946 to Leith Hill Shipping Co Ltd and renamed Marietta. Operated under the management of Counties Ship Management Ltd, London until 1948, then under the management of Phoenician Ship Agency Ltd, London. Sold in 1958 to Bury Hill Shipping Co, remaining under Phoecian's management. Scrapped in 1959 in Split, Yugoslavia.

=== Empire Dart ===
Empire Dart was a 4,186 GRT cargo ship which was built by Kockums Mekaniska Verkstad, Malmö. Launched in 1925 as Skaneland. Sold in 1928 to Hamburg South America Line and renamed Pernambuco. Seized in May 1945 as a war prize at Kiel. To MoWT and renamed Empire Dart. Allocated in 1946 to USSR and renamed Krasnodar. Scrapped in April 1975 in Split, Yugoslavia.

=== Empire Darwin ===
Empire Darwin was a 6,765 GRT cargo ship which was built by William Gray & Co, West Hartlepool. Launched on 13 May 1941 and completed in July 1941. Empire Darwin was a CAM ship. On 28 July 1943 her Hawker Hurricane shot down a Focke-Wulf Fw 200 Condor. She was damaged on 29 July 1943 by enemy bombing at 44°52′N 16°00′W, repaired at Glasgow. Sold in 1946 to the South Georgia Co Ltd and renamed Culrain. Operated under the management of Christian Salvesen & Co Ltd, Leith. Sold in 1959 to North Europe & Persian Gulf Transport Corporation and renamed Mersinidi. Operated under the management of J Livanos & Sons Ltd. Arrived on 30 December 1966 at Singapore for scrapping.

=== Empire Daughter ===
Empire Daughter was a 2,026 GRT collier which was built by Grangemouth Dockyard Co Ltd, Grangemouth. Launched on 27 December 1943 and completed in April 1944. Sold in 1946 to Harries Brothers & Co Ltd, Swansea and renamed Glanrhyd. Sold in 1948 to Tavistock Shipping Co, London, and renamed Noeldale. Sold in 1949 to Henry & McGregor Ltd, Leith and renamed Kinnaird Head. Sold in 1961 to Gino Gardella, Italy, and renamed Brick Quinto. Arrived on 13 July 1976 at Savona, Italy for scrapping.

=== Empire Dawn ===
Empire Dawn was a 7,241 GRT cargo ship which was built by William Doxford & Sons Ltd, Sunderland. Launched on 14 December 1940 and completed in April 1941. Sunk on 11 September 1942 by German raider Michel southwest of Cape Town.

=== Empire Day ===
Empire Day was a 7,242 GRT CAM ship which was built by William Doxford & Sons Ltd, Sunderland. Launched on 27 March 1941 and completed in July 1941. Torpedoed on 7 August 1944 and sunk by U-198 south east of Zanzibar (07°06′S 42°00′E).

=== Empire Deben ===
Empire Deben was an 11,251 GRT ocean liner which was built by Howaldtswerke, Kiel. Launched in 1922 as Thuringia for Hamburg America Line. Used on the New York and Boston routes until 1929 when she was sold to Hamburg South America Line and renamed General San Martin. Requisitioned in 1940 by the Kriegsmarine, used as a floating barracks, then a tender and finally a hospital ship. She took part in the evacuation of civilians from the Baltic. Seized in May 1945 at Copenhagen. To MoWT and renamed Empire Deben. Operated under the management of Shaw, Savill & Albion Line. Scrapped in March 1949 at Newport, Monmouthshire.

=== Empire Dee ===
Empire Dee was a 7,839 GRT cargo ship which was built by Deutsche Schiff- und Maschinenbau AG, Bremen. Launched in 1939 as Neidenfels for Deutsche Dampfschiffahrts-Gesellschaft "Hansa", Bremen. Seized in May 1945 at Eckernförde. To MoWT and renamed Empire Dee. Allocated in May 1946 to USSR and renamed Admiral Ushakov. Scrapped in October 1975 in Split, Yugoslavia.

=== Empire Deed ===
Empire Deed was a 6,676 GRT cargo ship which was built by Bartram & Sons Ltd, Sunderland. Launched on 6 February 1943 and completed in May 1943. Damaged on 25 May 1943 by enemy bombing at Sunderland. Sold in 1946 to Sussex Steamship Co Ltd and renamed Deed. Operated under the management of SG Embiricos Ltd, London. Sold in 1951 to Compagnia Navigazione Doro, Panama and renamed Doro. Sold in 1956 to Z L Cambanis & others, Greece, and renamed Leonidas Cambanis. Sold in 1964 to First Steamship Co Ltd, Taiwan and renamed Ever Fortune then Ever Happiness. Scrapped in June 1967 in Kaohsiung, Taiwan.

=== Empire Deep ===
Empire Deep was an 894 GRT coaster which was built by Harland & Wolff Ltd, Belfast. Launched on 9 September 1941. Transferred to the Dutch Government in 1942 and renamed Starkenborgh. Sold in 1947 to the Hollandsche Stoomboots Maatschappij and renamed Spaarnestroom. Sold in 1961 to Sartes Corporation, Greece and renamed Erato Sartes. Sold in 1963 to A I Petras, Greece and renamed Antonios P. Scrapped in July 1969 at Piraeus, Greece.

=== Empire Defender ===
Empire Defender was a 5,649 GRT cargo ship which was built by Joh. C. Tecklenborg AG, Wesermünde. Launched in 1910 as Freienfels Seized in by UK 1914 at Calcutta, India. To the Admiralty, then transferred in 1920 to the Secretary of State for India. Sold in 1925 to Rethymnis & Pnevmaticos, Greece, and renamed Hadiotis. Sold in 1928 to Achille Lauro & Co, Naples, Italy. and renamed Felce. Seized on 11 June 1940 at Haifa, Palestine. To MoWT and renamed Empire Defender. Ordered to sail from Glasgow to Malta laden with ammunition late in 1941. On 20 October 1941, 60 lascar sailors refused to sail, claiming that the vessel was cursed and would be sunk before the next new moon. The authorities were unable to persuade them to sail by either threats or inducements. An equivalent number of white sailors were procured with a payment of £10 in cash each to accept the lascar accommodation. The ship had been repainted with a black hull, white topsides, and a buff funnel, contrary to wartime regulations. All armament had been removed in an effort to make the ship appear as though she belonged to a neutral country. On sailing, she collided with two ships. She was in a convoy until off the Spanish coast, when she left and headed to Malta. The flag of whichever nation's waters she was in at the time was painted on her hull, thus she was passed off as a French, Spanish and Italian ship. On 14 November 1941, she was attacked by an enemy aircraft which dropped an aerial torpedo. Empire Defender was set on fire, her crew abandoned her and she blew up and sank 18 nautical miles (33 km) south of the Galite Islands, Tunisia.

=== Empire Defiance ===
Empire Defiance was a 4,667 GRT cargo ship which was built by Reiherstieg Schiffswerfte & Maschinenfabrik, Hamburg. Launched in 1909 as Iserlohn. Sold in 1921 to the St Just Steamship Co Ltd and renamed Union City. Sold in 1924 to J A Zachariassen & Co, Finland and renamed Wasaborg. Sold in 1935 to Achille Lauro & Co, Naples, and renamed Erica. Seized on 10 June 1940 at Liverpool. To MoWT and renamed Empire Defiance. Sunk in June 1944 as a blockship as part of Goosebery 5 at Sword Beach, Ouistreham, Calvados. Salvaged in 1951, towed by tugs Seaman and Superman for scrapping. Beached on 21 August 1951 off the Mole, Zeebrugge due to a leak developing. Refloated and arrived on 15 September 1951 at Antwerp, Belgium for scrapping.

=== Empire Dell ===
Empire Dell was a 7,065 GRT cargo ship which was built by Lithgows Ltd, Port Glasgow. Launched on 26 May 1941 and completed in August 1941. A CAM ship, she was torpedoed and sunk on 11 May 1942 by U-124 at 53°00′N 29°57′W while a member of Convoy ONS 92.

=== Empire Demon ===
Empire Demon was a 268 GRT tug which was built by John Crown & Sons Ltd, Sunderland. Launched on 31 December 1942 and completed in March 1943. To the Admiralty in 1943, Ministry of Transport in 1945, Admiralty in 1949. Chartered to United States Navy in 1962 for use in the River Clyde. Transferred in 1964 to HMS Sea Eagle, Derry and chartered by local Harbour Commissioners. Collided on 26 March 1965 with MV Norse Lion which she was towing. Declared a constructive total loss. Sold in January 1966 to Haulbowline Industries, Passage West, Ireland for scrapping. On 15 February 1966, while on way to breakers, she lost her tow, the dredger Dredger No. 2 off Wexford in heavy weather. Put into Dublin where crew deserted. Resold to a Dublin shipbreaker and scrapped in March 1966 in Dublin.

=== Empire Denis ===
Empire Denis was a 275 GRT tug which was built by Cochrane & Sons Ltd, Selby. Launched on 26 September 1942 and completed in 1943. Sold in 1948 to Clyde Shipping Co Ltd and renamed Flying Meteor. Sold in 1962 to I C Guy Ltd, Cardiff and renamed Royal Rose. Sold in 1963 to R & J H Rea Ltd and renamed Yewgarth. On 14 September 1965 she was crushed between a lock wall and Aldersgate at Cardiff. Beached outside the dock entrance, refloated on 20 September 1965 but declared a constructive total loss and scrapped in November 1965 at Newport, Monmouthshire.

=== Empire Deptford ===
Empire Deptford was a 2,040 GRT collier which was built by Grangemouth Dockyard Co Ltd, Grangemouth. Laid down as Empire Deptford and launched in 1946 as SNCF No 1 for Société Nationale D'Affrêtements, France. Sold in 1947 to Société Nationale des Chemins de fer Français and renamed Perrigny. Sold in 1958 to Société Navale Caennaise SA, Caen, then sold in 1962 to Hanseatishce Keiswerke GmbH, Germany and renamed Otto Pruss. Converted to a suction dredger and fitted with a new diesel engine. Sold in 1966 to Gesellschaft für Keisgewinnung und Keisvertrieb MbH and renamed Hanseat III. Operated under the management of O A Müller, Germany. Sold in 1974 to Bredo Baltic Gravels SA, Panama, still under the management of Müller. Scrapped in August 1975 in Hamburg.

=== Empire Derwent ===
Empire Derwent was a 4,026 GRT cargo ship which was built by William Pickersgill & Sons Ltd, Sunderland. Launched in 1930 as Stakesby for Rowland & Marwood Steamship Co. Operated under the management of Headlam & Son, Whitby. Torpedoed on 25 August 1940 by U-124 23 nautical miles (43 km) north of Butt of Lewis, Hebrides. Beached on the west coast but slid off the beach and sank in deep water. she was salvaged sixteen months later and rebuilt. To MoWT in 1943 and renamed Empire Derwent. Sold in 1946 to J D McLaren & Co, London and renamed Swan Point. Became stranded on 31 July 1949 in Karnaphuli River, Chittagong, India. Broke in two and declared a total loss.

=== Empire Dew ===
Empire Dew was a 7,005 GRT cargo ship which was built by Lithgows Ltd, Port Glasgow. Launched on 21 November 1940 and completed in January 1941. Torpedoed on 12 June 1941 and sunk by U-48 at 51°09′N 30°16′W.

=== Empire Diamond ===
Empire Diamond was an 8,236 GRT tanker which was built by Harland & Wolff Ltd, Belfast. Launched on 10 July 1941 and completed in November 1941. To Norwegian Government in 1942 and renamed Norsol. Sold in 1946 to A/S Kollbjørg and renamed Kollbjørg. Operated under the management of O Berg, Oslo. sold in 1956 to Rederi Norland, Sweden, and renamed Storo. Operated under the management of Odmark & Andersson, Sweden. Arrived on 20 November 1959 at Hong Kong for scrapping.

=== Empire Dickens ===
Empire Dickens was a 9,819 GRT tanker which was built by Furness Shipbuilding Co Ltd, Haverton Hill-on-Tees. Launched on 14 February 1942 and completed in April 1942. Sold in 1946 to Anglo-American Oil Co Ltd and renamed Esso Appalachee. Sold in 1947 to Esso Petroleum Co Ltd. Arrived on 2 August 1960 at Faslane for scrapping.

=== Empire Diplomat ===
Empire Diplomat was a 6,498 GRT tanker which was built by J Brown & Co Ltd, Clydebank. Launched in 1926 as British Diplomat for the British Tanker Co Ltd. By 1939, she was in use as a depot ship at Oran, Algeria. She returned to the UK in March 1940 for repairs and was requisitioned by the MoWT. She was scrapped in 1946 at Dunston on Tyne, Northumberland.

=== Empire Dirk ===
Empire Dirk was a 2,942 GRT cargo ship which was built by Ailsa Shipbuilding Co Ltd, Troon, Ayrshire. Launched on 31 August 1943 and completed in December 1943. Sold in 1951 to Moller Line Ltd, Hong Kong, and renamed Nancy Moller. Sold later that year to Mount Line Ltd, Hong Kong, and renamed Mount Austin, operated under the management of Mollers Ltd, Hong Kong. Sold in 1952 to the Australian Government and renamed Coolabah. Sold in 1956 to the Cambay Prince Steamship Co Ltd and renamed Troon Breeze. Operated under the management of J Manners & Co Ltd, Hong Kong. Sold in 1964 to San Fernando Steamship Co Ltd, Panama and renamed Cachupin, still under Manners' management. Sold in 1966 to Shui Cheung Shipping & Trading Ltd, Hong Kong, and renamed Kowloon No 1. Ran aground on 16 September 1967 at Hachinohe, Japan (40°32′N 141°33′E). Refloated on 7 October 1967 and towed to Yokosuka. Declared a constructive loss, scrapped in June 1968 in Opama, Japan.

=== Empire Dockland ===
Empire Dockland was a 683 GRT dredger hopper ship which was built by William Simons & Co Ltd, Renfrew. Launched on 24 June 1944 and completed later that year. To the Admiralty in 1944 and renamed W 101. Renamed W 31 in 1947, ownership passing to the Ministry of Public Buildings & Works in 1973. Offered for sale in 1970 by the Board of Trade.

=== Empire Dolly ===
Empire Dolly was a 257 GRT tug which was built by John Crown & Sons Ltd, Sunderland. Launched on 5 July 1943 and completed in September 1943. Sold in 1953 to Steel & Bennie Ltd and renamed Thunderer. Sold in 1958 to Saint John Tug Boat Co Ltd, Bermuda and renamed Ocean Osprey.

=== Empire Dolphin ===
Empire Dolphin was a 5,037 GRT Hog Islander which was built by American International Shipbuilding Co, Hog Island, Philadelphia, Pennsylvania. Launched in 1920 as Calaumet, she was completed as Vaba for the USSB. To Charbonneau Rajola, the United States in 1920 and returned to USSB in 1921. Converted to a tanker in June 1921 by Curtis Bay Copper & Iron Works, Curtis Bay, Maryland. To American-Italian Steamship Co Inc, New York in 1923 and then Tankers Corporation, New York later that year. To Steamer Vaba Corporation, New York in 1924. to Kellogg Steamship Corporation, New York in 1929 and renamed Ruth Kellogg. To MoWT in 1940 and renamed Empire Dolphin in 1941. Scrapped in February 1947 at Briton Ferry, West Glamorgan.

=== Empire Dombey ===
Empire Dombey was an 813 GRT coastal tanker which was built by A & J Inglis Ltd, Glasgow. Launched on 15 May 1944 and completed in July 1944. Sold in 1947 to F T Everard & Sons Ltd and renamed Allurity. Sold in October 1964 for scrapping in the Netherlands but resold. Scrapped in April 1965 in Bruges.

=== Empire Dominica ===
Empire Dominica was a 7,306 GRT cargo ship which was built by Short Brothers Ltd, Sunderland. Launched on 26 April 1945 and completed in August 1945. Sold in 1946 to the India Steamship Co Ltd, Calcutta, and renamed Indian Endeavour. Arrived on 22 September 1966 in Hong Kong for scrapping.

=== Empire Don ===
Empire Don was a 2,553 GRT cargo ship which was built by Ropner & Sons, Stockton on Tees. Launched in 1895 as Barlby. Sold in 1926 to D A Mango, Greece, and renamed Noemi. Sold in 1930 to Noemijulia Steamship Co Ltd and renamed Noemijulia. Operated under the management of W G Walton. Sold in 1940 to Compagnia Maritima Panama Ultramar Ltda, Panama. Sold in 1941 to Irish Shipping Ltd, Ireland and renamed Irish Hazel. Requisitioned on 17 November 1943 at Newport, Monmouthshire while undergoing repairs. To MoWT and renamed Empire Don. Returned in 1945 to Irish Shipping Ltd and renamed Irish Hazel. Sold in 1949 to Turk Silepcilik Limited, Turkey and renamed Uman. Ran aground on 6 January 1960 at Kefken Point, Black Sea, a total loss.

=== Empire Doon ===
Empire Doon was a 17,362 GRT liner which was built by Blohm & Voss, Hamburg. Launched on 16 July 1936 as Pretoria for the German East Africa Line. Maiden voyage to Cape Town started on 19 December 1936, but ran aground at East Lepe, in the Solent. Undamaged and later refloated. Requisitioned in 1939 by the Kriegsmarine and used as a submarine depot ship. Converted to a hospital ship in 1940. Seized in May 1945 at Copenhagen, To MoWT and renamed Empire Doon. Converted to a troopship at Newcastle upon Tyne. Operated under the management of the Orient Steam Navigation Co Ltd. Problems with her boilers meant that she had to be withdrawn from service. She was towed back to the UK from Port Said and laid up off Southend-on-Sea. She was re-boilered by J I Thorneycroft & Co, Southampton. Renamed Empire Orwell on completion of refit in January 1950. Withdrawn in December 1957 and laid up at the Isle of Portland. Chartered in 1958 to Pan-Islamic Steamship Co, Karachi, then sold later that year to Ocean Steamship Co, Liverpool. Operated under the management of A Holt & Co. Refitted in 1958 by Barclay, Curle & Co, Glasgow. Intended to be renamed Dardanus but was renamed Gunung Djati. Sold in 1962 to the Indonesian Government. Sold in 1964 to Perushaan Pelajaran Arafat, Djakarta. New diesel engines were fitted in 1972 in Hong Kong. To the Indonesian Navy in 1979 and renamed KRI Tanjung Pandan, with pennant number 971. Laid up in 1981 in Tanjung Priok as an accommodation vessel. Sold in 1987 to shipbreakers in Taiwan.

=== Empire Dorado ===
Empire Dorado was a 5,595 GRT cargo ship which was built by Atlantic Corporation, Portsmouth, New Hampshire. Launched in 1920 as Tolosa for the USSB. To MoWT in 1940 and renamed Empire Dorado. Bombed on 8 November 1940 west of Ireland (55°07′N 16°50′W). Towed to the Clyde for repairs. Collided on 20 November 1941 with SS Theomitor at 57°58′N 20°38′W. Taken in tow by a Royal Navy ship but sank on 22 November 1941.

=== Empire Doreen (I) ===
Empire Doreen was a 307 GRT tug which was built by Scott & Sons, Bowling. Laid down as Empire Doreen but launched on 1 May 1946 as Nirumund for Petroleum Steamship Co Ltd, London. Sold in 1955 to British Tanker Co Ltd and renamed BP Defender. Renamed Nirumund in 1956. Sold in 1958 to BP Tanker Co Ltd. Sold in 1971 to Gulf Shipping Co Ltd, Iran and renamed Niru. Sank 1 mile north of Abadan, date unknown.

=== Empire Doreen (II) ===
Empire Doreen was a 292 GRT tug which was built by Cochrane & Sons Ltd, Selby. Laid down as Empire Doreen but launched on 4 February 1946 as Empire Hedda and completed in September 1946 as Atlas for Bergnings och Dykari A/B Neptun, Sweden. Sold in 1965 to Rim. Sardi, Italy, and renamed Maroso. Scrapped in 1986 in Italy.

=== Empire Doric ===
HMS LST 3041

Empire Doric was a LST3 which was built by Harland & Wolff Ltd, Govan. Completed in June 1945 as LST 3041, she was converted to a ferry in 1948. Arrived on 13 January 1960 at Port Glasgow for scrapping.

=== Empire Doris ===
Empire Doris was a 258 GRT tug which was built by Scott & Sons, Bowling. Launched on 14 March 1944 and completed in April 1944. Chartered in 1945 to British Tanker Co Ltd. Sold in 1948 to Petroleum Steamship Co Ltd, London, and renamed Bahramand. Sold in 1958 to BP Tanker Co Ltd. Sold in 1968 to A Shafei, Iran and renamed Tahamtan.

=== Empire Dorothy ===
Empire Dorothy was a 259 GRT tug which was built by Cook, Welton & Gemmell Ltd, Beverley, Yorkshire. Launched on 1 August 1945 and completed in October 1945. Sent to Singapore and Japan to work. Sold in 1949 to Malaya Railways. Sold in 1958 to the Government of Malaya and renamed Dorothy. allocated to the Port Swettenham Port Authority. Sold in 1970 to Straits Engineers Ltd, Singapore. A new diesel engine was fitted in 1973. Sold in 1975 to World Dredging Ltd, Panama, and renamed Straits Winner. Sold in 1981 to shipbreakers, scrapped in February 1983 in Jurong, Singapore.

=== Empire Dorrit ===
Empire Dorrit was a 965 GRT coaster which was built by Scott & Sons, Bowling. Launched on 4 October 1944 and completed in December 1944. To the French Government in 1945 and renamed Lieutenant Lancelot. Operated under the management of Société Navale Caennaise Sa, France. Sold in 1954 to Holderness Steamship Co and renamed Holdernith. Operated under the management of T Kittlewell & Son Ltd, Hull. Grounded on 17 January 1957 on Whitton Sand, Humber Estuary and sank. Refloated on 19 January 1957 and towed to Hull. Scrapped in 1963 in Thos. W. Ward Grays, Essex.

=== Empire Douglas ===
Empire Douglas was a 1,925 GRT cargo ship which was built by Duivendijks Scheepwerke, Lekkerkerk. Launched in 1943 as Wilhelmshaven for Hamburg America Line. Seized in May 1945 at Kiel. To MoWT and renamed Empire Douglas. Allocated in 1946 to USSR and renamed Korsun Shevtshenkovsky. Scrapped in March 1972 in Ghent, Belgium.

=== Empire Dove ===
Empire Dove was a 2,503 GRT cargo ship which was built by NV Scheeps Gebr Pot, Bolnes, Netherlands. Intended to be Hermes for Koninklijke Nederlandsche Stoomboot Maatschappij but seized in May 1945 in an incomplete state. completed in June 1946 in Germany, to MoWT and renamed Empire Dove. Sold in 1949 to MacAndrews & Co Ltd, London. Renamed Pozarica in 1953. Sold in 1964 to Societa Anônimo Letasa, Spain and renamed Blue Fin. On 27 November 1965, she lost her rudder in a storm. Although she was taken in tow her cargo shifted and she sank on 28 November 60 nautical miles (110 km) west of La Rochelle, France.

=== Empire Dovey ===
Empire Dovey was a 2,883 GRT cargo ship which was built by AG Weser, Bremen. Launched in 1929 as Hercules for Neptun Line, Bremen. Seized in May 1945 at Copenhagen. To MoWT and renamed Empire Dovey. Allocated in 1946 to USSR and renamed Kirovograd. Scrapped in September 1968 in West Germany.

=== Empire Downland ===
Emire Downland was a 683 GRT hopper ship which was built by Fleming & Ferguson Ltd, Paisley. Launched on 19 December 1944 and completed in April 1945. Sold in 1945 to the Superintendent Civil Engineer, Bombay. Sold in 1947 to Melbourne Harbour Trust Commissioners, Melbourne, Australia and renamed Chas. A Phayer. Sold in 1966 to Devonport Marine Board, Devonport, Tasmania and renamed Leven. Scrapped in June 1988 in Devonport, Tasmania.

=== Empire Dragon ===
Empire Dragon was a 6,854 GRT cargo ship which was built by Hong Kong & Whampoa Dock Co Ltd, Hong Kong. Launched on 6 December 1941, captured in an incomplete state by the Japanese and completed by them as Gyōkū Maru. Torpedoed on 14 November 1944 and sunk by USS Spadefish in the East China Sea (31°04′N 123°56′E).

=== Empire Drayton ===
Empire Drayton was a 7,023 GRT cargo ship which was built by Swan Hunter & Wigham Richardson Ltd, Wallsend. Launched on 23 October 1941 and completed in February 1942. To Belgian Government in 1942 and renamed Belgian Sailor. Sold in 1946 to Compagnie Maritime Belge SA, Belgium and renamed Capitaine Biebuyck. Sold in 1958 to Yugoslavian Government and renamed Kastav. Sold in 1965 to Ivory Shipping Co Ltd and renamed Ivory Tellus. Operated under the management of Aries Shipping Co Ltd, Hong Kong. Arrived on 22 April 1970 at Hirao, Japan for scrapping.

=== Empire Driver ===
Empire Driver was a 7,042 GRT cargo ship which was built by William Gray & Co Ltd, West Hartlepool. Launched on 24 September 1942 and completed in November 1942. To the French Government in 1945 and renamed Radiotélégraphiste Biard. Operated under the management of Compagnie des Chargeurs Reunis. Sold in 1950 to Pasquale Mazzella, Naples, and renamed Dea Mazzella. Renamed Maria Mazzella in 1956. Sold in 1960 to Pala and Franchescini, Genoa and renamed Falzarego. Sold in 1964 to Societa per Azioni Costanza, Genoa and renamed Grazia Prima. Sold in 1965 to Luzmar SA, Liberia, and renamed Missouri. Arrived on 8 February 1969 at Santander, Spain for scrapping.

=== Empire Drover ===
Empire Drover was a 1,047 GRT coaster which was built by Ardrossan Dockyard Ltd., Ardrossan. Launched on 30 October 1944 and completed in December 1944. Sold in 1946 to Queenship Navigation Ltd and renamed Roman Queen. Scrapped in 1961 at Hendrik Ido Ambacht, Netherlands.

=== Empire Druid ===
Empire Druid was a 9,829 GRT tanker built by Sir J Laing & Sons Ltd, Sunderland. Launched on 10 September 1941 and completed in December 1941. To the Norwegian Government's Nortraship in 1942 and renamed Norholm. Sold in 1946 to Olsen & Ugelstad, Oslo, and renamed Haukefell. Diesel engine recovered from the wreck of Vega fitted in 1949. Sold in 1952 to Compagnia Atlantica Pacifica SA, Panama, and renamed Bluewater. Operated under the management of Tidewater Commercial Co Inc, Baltimore, USA. Arrived on 27 July 1959 at Osaka for scrapping.

=== Empire Drum ===
Empire Drum was a 7,244 GRT cargo ship which was built by William Doxford & Sons Ltd, Sunderland. Launched on 19 November 1941 and completed in March 1942. Torpedoed on 24 April 1942 and sunk by U-136 at 37°00′N 69°15′W.

=== Empire Drury ===
Empire Drury was a 797 GRT coaster which was built by Grangemouth Dockyard Co, Grangemouth. Launched on 7 October 1944 and completed in December 1944. Sold in 1947 to Shell Mex & BP Ltd and renamed Shelbrit 6. Renamed BP Refiner in 1952. Sold in 1964 to Compagnia Siciliana Navi Cisterna SpA, Italy and renamed Cosina. Scrapped in June 1973 in Palermo, Italy.

=== Empire Dryden ===
Empire Dryden was a 7,164 GRT cargo ship which was built by William Doxford & Sons Ltd, Sunderland. Launched on 22 October 1941 and completed in February 1942. Torpedoed on 20 April 1942 and sunk by U-572 north of the Bahamas (34°21′N 69°00′W).

=== Empire Duchess ===
Empire Duchess was a 7,067 GRT cargo ship which was built by Short Brothers Ltd, Sunderland. Launched on 14 August 1943 and completed in December 1943. Sold in 1949 to Union Castle Mail Steamship Co Ltd and renamed Braemar Castle. Sold in 1950 to King Line Ltd and renamed King James. Sold in 1958 to Cambay Prince Steamship Co Ltd and renamed Tyne Breeze. Operated under the management of J Manners & Co Ltd, Hong Kong. Sold in 1963 to Cathay Trader Steamship Co Ltd and renamed Cathay Trader, remaining under Manners' management. Sold in 1964 to Pacific Pearl Navigation Co Ltd, Hong Kong, and renamed Pearl Light. Sold in 1966 to Marikar Navigation & Agencies Ltd, Hong Kong, and renamed Habib Marikar. On 3 November 1967 she suffered a major engine breakdown in heavy weather at 16°37′N 113°02′E. The next day she drifted ashore on Lincoln Island, Paracel Islands (16°38′N 112°45′E), a constructive total loss.

=== Empire Duke ===
Empire Duke was a 7,249 GRT cargo ship which was built by J L Thompson & Sons Ltd, Sunderland. Launched on 20 July 1943 and completed in November 1943. Sold in 1945 to the French Government and renamed Lieutenant J Le Meur. Sold in 1949 to Compagnie Franco-Cherifienne de Navigation, Morocco and renamed Zelidja. Sold in 1955 to Compagnia de Navigazione Hellespont SA, Liberia and renamed Propontis. Sold in 1957 to Compagnie de Navigazione Propontis Liberia SA, Liberia. Operated under the management of A M Embiricos, Monaco. Arrived on 24 May 1966 at Kaohsiung for scrapping.

=== Empire Dunbar ===
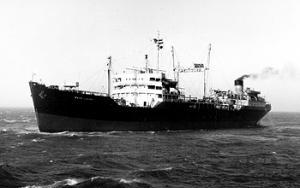
RFA Wave Laird

Empire Dunbar was an 8,187 GRT cargo ship which was built by Sir J Laing & Sons Ltd, Sunderland. Launched on 3 April 1946 and completed in September 1946 as RFA Wave Laird. Scrapped in March 1970 in Gandia, Spain.

=== Empire Dunlin ===
Empire Dunlin was a 6,326 GRT cargo ship which was built by Skinner & Eddy Corp, Seattle. Launched in 1919 as Editor for the USSB. To MoWT in 1941 and renamed Empire Dunlin. To the Norwegian Government in 1942 and renamed Norlom. Ran aground on 26 April 1942 on Valiant Rock, New London, Connecticut. Refloated on 11 May 1942 and towed to New York for repairs. Bombed on 2 December 1943 and sunk in Bari Harbour, Italy.

=== Empire Dunnet ===
Empire Dunnet was a 7,373 GRT cargo ship which was built by William Gray & Co Ltd, West Hartlepool. Launched on 10 July 1945 and completed in September 1945. Sold in 1946 to Clan Line Steamers Ltd and renamed Clan Mackinnon. Sold in 1961 to Mullion & Co Ltd, Hong Kong, and renamed Ardross. Sold in 1963 to Kinabatangan Shipping SA, Panama and renamed Labuan Bay. Operated under the management of United China Shipping Co Ltd, Hong Kong. Ran aground on 20 March 1967 at Bancoran Island, Borneo (7°58′N 118°04′E) and caught fire. Refloated on 24 March 1967 and towed to Manila, Philippines. A further fire occurred on 11 July 1967. Scrapped in November 1967 at Kaohsiung, Taiwan.

=== Empire Dunstan ===
Empire Dunstan was a 2,887 GRT cargo ship which was built by Grangemouth Dockyard Co Ltd, Grangemouth. Launched on 19 November 1941 and completed in January 1942. Torpedoed on 18 November 1943 and sunk by U-81 in the Ionian Sea (39°24′N 17°40′E).

=== Empire Durant ===
Empire Durant was a 2,902 GRT cargo ship which was built by Eltringham's Ltd, Willington on Tyne. Launched in 1921 as Dalewood. Sold in 1923 to B Blumenfeld Akt, Germany and renamed Bernhard Blumenfeld. Sold in 1938 to Krupp Reederei und Kohlenhandel GmbH, Essen and renamed Carl Jüngst. Seized in May 1945 at Kiel, to MoWT and renamed Empire Durant. Allocated in 1946 to USSR and renamed Tambov, used as a mother ship for Russian trawler fleets then removed from shipping registers in 1958.

=== Empire Dweller ===
Empire Dweller was a 667 GRT coastal tanker which was built by George Brown & Co (Marine) Ltd, Greenock. Launched on 19 February 1942 and completed in June 1942. Sold in 1945 to F T Everard & Sons Ltd and renamed Asperity. Sold in April 1967 to A E Pearce Ltd, Essex for scrapping but resold, reported having been scrapped in May 1967 in Belgium.

=== Empire Dyke ===
Empire Dyke was a 489 GRT coaster which was built by Clelands (Successors) Ltd, Wallsend. Launched on 15 January 1942 and completed in April 1942. To Dutch Government in 1943 and renamed Prinses Margriet. Sold in 1954 to South Coast Shipping Co Ltd and renamed Sand Star. Operated under the management of Burness Shipping Co Ltd. Converted to a sand dredger in 1955 and management passed to Wm Cory & Sons Ltd in 1956. Collided with Caroline M on 4 March 1966 and sank. Raised in May and scrapped in September 1966 in Thos. W. Ward Grays, Essex.

=== Empire Dynasty ===
Empire Dynasty was a 9,905 GRT cargo ship which was built by J.L. Thompson and Sons, Sunderland. Launched on 22 May 1944 and completed in November 1944. Sold in 1946 to Eastern & Australian Steamship Co Ltd and renamed Eastern. Sold in 1965 to Eddie Steamship Co Ltd and renamed Dori. Operated under the management of W H Eddie Hsu, Taiwan. Sold on 4 July 1967 for scrapping while lying at Kaohsiung, Taiwan.

== See also ==
The above entries give a precis of each ship's history. For a fuller account see the linked articles.

== Sources ==
- Mitchell, W H; Sawyer, L A (1990). The Empire Ships (Second ed.). London, New York, Hamburg, Hong Kong: Lloyd's of London Press Ltd. ISBN 1-85044-275-4.
