= List of ship launches in 1924 =

The list of ship launches in 1924 includes a chronological list of some ships launched in 1924.

	Ship	Class	Builder	Location	Country	Notes
5 January	S-47	S-class submarine	Bethlehem Shipbuilding Corporation	Quincy, Massachusetts	United States	For United States Navy.
10 January	Minnetonka	Passenger ship	Harland & Wolff	Belfast	United Kingdom	For Atlantic Transport Line.
19 January	Luxmi	Passenger ship	Harland & Wolff	Belfast	United Kingdom	For Bank Line.
22 January	Cedarton	Cargo ship	Harland & Wolff	Belfast	United Kingdom	For Matthews Steamship Co.
22 January	Ornais	Cargo ship	Blyth Shipbuilding & Dry Docks Co. Ltd	Blyth	United Kingdom	For Paul Duval.
24 January	Glenshiel	Cargo ship	Harland & Wolff	Belfast	United Kingdom	For Glen Line.
24 January	Submarine No. 84 (Ro-63)	Type L4 submarine	Mitsubishi	Kobe	Japan	For Imperial Japanese Navy
5 February	Dashwood	Collier	Vickers Ltd	Barrow-in-Furness	United Kingdom	For Wm. France, Fenwick & Co. Ltd.
6 February	Aurania	Ocean liner	Swan, Hunter & Wigham Richardson	Wallsend-on-Tyne	United Kingdom	For Cunard Line
8 February	Cable Enterprise	Cable layer	Harland & Wolff	Belfast	United Kingdom	For Western Telegraph Co.
21 February	A.P.O.C No. 13	Oil barge	Amble Shipbuilding Co. Ltd.	Amble	United Kingdom	For Anglo-Persian Oil Co. Ltd.
21 February	Birchton	Cargo ship	Harland & Wolff	Belfast	United Kingdom	For Matthews Steamship Co.
23 February	De Grasse	Ocean liner	Cammell Laird	Birkenhead	United Kingdom	For Compagnie Générale Transatlantique
15 March	Hatakaze	Kamikaze-class destroyer	Maizuru Naval Arsenal	Maizuru, Kyoto	Japan	For Imperial Japanese Navy.
21 March	La Motte-Picquet	Duguay-Trouin-class cruiser	Arsenal de Lorient		France	For French Navy.
22 March	Cariboo	Refrigerated cargo ship	Harland & Wolff	Belfast	United Kingdom	For Elder Dempster.
24 March	Inverbank	Cargo ship	Harland & Wolff	Belfast	United Kingdom	For Bank Line.
25 March	Glanrhyd	Collier	Vickers Ltd	Barrow-in-Furness	United Kingdom	For Harries Bros. & Co.
17 April	Memphis	Omaha-class cruiser	William Cramp & Sons	Philadelphia, Pennsylvania	United States	For United States Navy.
21 April	Asanagi	Kamikaze-class destroyer	Fujinagata Shipyards	Osaka	Japan	For Imperial Japanese Navy.
22 April	Khuzistan	Cargo ship	Amble Shipbuilding Co. Ltd.	Amble	United Kingdom	For British Tanker Co. Ltd.
23 April	Glenbank	Cargo ship	Harland & Wolff	Belfast	United Kingdom	For Bank Line.
23 April	Medway Queen	Paddle steamer	Ailsa Shipbuilding Company	Troon	United Kingdom	For New Medway Steam Packet Company
23 April	Yūnagi	Kamikaze-class destroyer	Sasebo Naval Arsenal	Sasebo, Nagasaki	Japan	For Imperial Japanese Navy.
2 May	Dinard	Ferry	William Denny and Brothers	Dumbarton, Scotland	United Kingdom	
2 May	Gallium	Cargo ship	Blyth Shipbuilding & Dry Docks Co. Ltd	Blyth	United Kingdom	For A. Lemoine et Fils.
2 May	Jamnagar	Coaster	J I Thornycroft & Co Ltd	Woolston	United Kingdom	For The Maharaja Jam Sahib of Nawanagar
3 May	Catalina	Passenger ship	Los Angeles Shipbuilding and Drydock	San Pedro, California	United States	For William Wrigley Jr.
19 May	Takliwa	Cargo liner	Barclay, Curle & Co Ltd	Glasgow	United Kingdom	For British India Steam Navigation Co Ltd.
20 May	Orama	Cargo liner	Vickers Ltd	Barrow-in-Furness	United Kingdom	For Orient Steam Navigation Company.
21 May	Primauguet	Duguay-Trouin-class cruiser	Arsenal de Brest	Brest	France	For French Navy.
2 June	Birchbank	Cargo ship	Harland & Wolff	Belfast	United Kingdom	For Bank Line.
3 June	Tonbridge	Cargo ship	D. and W. Henderson and Company	Glasgow	United Kingdom	For Southern Railway
17 June	Minster	Ferry	Harland & Wolff	Belfast	United Kingdom	For Southern Railway.
17 June	Rio Dorado	Cargo ship	Blyth Shipbuilding & Dry Docks Co. Ltd	Blyth	United Kingdom	For Thompson Steam Shipping Co. Ltd.
18 June	Adventure	Minelaying cruiser	Vickers Limited	Barrow in Furness	United Kingdom	For Royal Navy.
18 June	Hector	Cargo liner	Scotts Shipbuilding and Engineering Company	Greenock	United Kingdom	For Ocean Steamship Co Ltd
1 July	Papuan Chief	Cargo ship	Harland & Wolff	Belfast	United Kingdom	For Steamship Trading Co.
2 July	Asuka Maru	Cargo ship	Harland & Wolff	Belfast	United Kingdom	For Nippon Yusen Kaisha Line.
3 July	Tullochmoor	Cargo ship	Blyth Shipbuilding & Dry Docks Co. Ltd	Blyth	United Kingdom	For Moor Line Ltd.
7 July	Cedarbank	Cargo ship	Harland & Wolff	Belfast	United Kingdom	For Bank Line.
17 July	V-1	Barracuda-class submarine	Portsmouth Naval Shipyard	Kittery, Maine	United States	For United States Navy.
21 July	Sheaf Crest	Cargo ship	Blyth Shipbuilding & Dry Docks Co. Ltd	Blyth	United Kingdom	For Sheaf Steam Shipping Co. Ltd.
19 August	Submarine No. 79 (Ro-64)	Type L4 submarine	Mitsubishi	Kobe	Japan	For Imperial Japanese Navy.
3 September	Comliebank	Cargo ship	Harland & Wolff	Belfast	United Kingdom	For Bank Line.
3 September	Elmworth	Cargo ship	Harland & Wolff	Belfast	United Kingdom	For R. S. Dalgleish Ltd.
11 September	Statendam	Passenger ship	Harland & Wolff	Belfast	United Kingdom	For Holland America Line.
26 September	Procris	Cargo ship	Harland & Wolff	Belfast	United Kingdom	For J. & P. Hutchinson Ltd.
29 September	Léopard	Chacal-class destroyer		Saint Nazaire	France	For French Navy.
30 September	Inverglass	Tanker	Harland & Wolff	Belfast	United Kingdom	For British Mexican Petroleum Company.
September	Princess Kathleen	Cargo liner	John Brown & Company	Clydebank	United Kingdom	For Canadian Pacific Steamships
September	Rosemarie	Fishing trawler	G. Seebeck AG	Wesermünde	Germany	For Hochseefischerei J. Wieting AG
1 October	Uskmoor	Cargo ship	Blyth Shipbuilding & Dry Docks Co. Ltd	Blyth	United Kingdom	For Moor Line Ltd.
13 October	Clydebank	Cargo ship	Harland & Wolff	Belfast	United Kingdom	For Bank Line.
13 October	Redline No.1	Tanker	Harland & Wolff	Belfast	United Kingdom	For British Mexican Petroleum Company.
16 October	Razmak	Passenger ship	Harland & Wolff	Govan	United Kingdom	For Peninsular and Oriental Steam Navigation Company.
28 October	Arthur Duncker	Fishing trawler	J. C. Tecklenborg AG	Wesermünde	Germany	For Kämpf & Meyer.
28 October	Sheaf Water	Cargo ship	Blyth Shipbuilding & Dry Docks Co. Ltd	Blyth	United Kingdom	For Sheaf Steam Shipping Co. Ltd.
15 November	Fritz Reiser	Fishing trawler	J. C. Tecklenborg AG	Wesermünde	Germany	For Kämpf & Meyer.
25 November	Fendris	Cargo ship	Harland & Wolff	Belfast	United Kingdom	For J. & P. Hutchinson Ltd.
26 November	Oakworth	Cargo ship	Harland & Wolff	Belfast	United Kingdom	For R. S. Dalgleish Ltd.
9 December	Thistleros	Cargo ship	Harland & Wolff	Belfast	United Kingdom	For Allan Black & Co.
5 December	Kipawo	Ferry	Saint John Shipbuilding	Saint John, New Brunswick	Canada	First ship built by the yard. For Dominion Atlantic Railway
10 December	Cape Leeuwin	Lighthouse tender	Cockatoo Island Dockyard	Sydney	Australia	For Queensland Department of Commerce
14 October	Letitia	Ocean liner	Fairfield Shipbuilding and Engineering Company	Govan	United Kingdom	For Anchor-Donaldson Ltd
27 November	Oite	Kamikaze-class destroyer	Uraga Dock Company	Uraga	Japan	For Imperial Japanese Navy.
6 December	Ouragan	Bourrasque-class destroyer	Chantiers Navals Français	Caen	France	For French Navy.
27 December	V-2	Barracuda-class submarine	Portsmouth Naval Shipyard	Kittery, Maine	United States	For United States Navy.
28 December	Leonardo da Vinci	Ocean liner	Ansaldo	La Spezia	Italy	For Società di Navigazione Transatlantica
2nd Quarter	Cory Oil No. 1	Steam tank barge	Amble Shipbuilding Co. Ltd.	Amble	United Kingdom	For Cory Bros. & Co. Ltd.
2nd Quarter	Cory Oil No. 2	Steam tank barge	Amble Shipbuilding Co. Ltd.	Amble	United Kingdom	For Cory Bros. & Co. Ltd.
4th Quarter	Roger Beck	Pilot boat	Amble Shipbuilding Co. Ltd.	Amble	United Kingdom	For Swansea Pilot Boat Co. Ltd.
Unknown date	Alexander Hamilton	Steamship			United States	For Hudson River Day Line
Unknown date	Algerian	Steamship	Barclay, Curle & Co. Ltd.	Glasgow	United Kingdom	For Ellerman & Papayanni Lines Ltd.
Unknown date	Alk	Cargo ship	Neptun AG	Rostock	Germany	For Roland Linie AG
Unknown date	Antenor	Ocean liner	Palmers Shipbuilding and Iron Company	Jarrow	United Kingdom	For Alfred Holt and Company
Unknown date	Centaur	Cargo liner	Scotts Shipbuilding and Engineering Company	Greenock	United Kingdom	For Alfred Holt and Company
Unknown date	City of Venice	Passenger ship	Workman, Clark & Co Ltd	Belfast	United Kingdom	For Ellerman Lines
Unknown date	Corinthic	Cargo ship	Irvine's Shipbuilding & Dry Dock Co Ltd	West Hartlepool	United Kingdom	For W H Cockerline & Co Ltd, Hull
Unknown date	Greater Buffalo	Paddlewheeler	American Ship Building Company	Lorain, Ohio	United States	For Detroit and Cleveland Navigation Company
Unknown date	Janey III	Yacht	Consolidated Shipbuilding Corp	Morris Heights, New York	United States	For Clifford C Hemphill
Unknown date	Kamloops	Lake freighter	Furness Shipbuilding	Haverton Hill-on-Tees	United Kingdom	For Canada Steamship Lines
Unknown date	Kingswear Castle	Paddle steamer	Philip and Son	Dartmouth	United Kingdom	For Great Western Railway
Unknown date	Klio	Cargo ship	AG Weser	Bremen	Germany	For Neptun Line
Unknown date	Levenwood	Coaster			United Kingdom	For Joseph Constantine & Co Ltd
Unknown date	Menna	Paddle steamer	I. J. Abdela & Mitchell Ltd.	Queensferry	United Kingdom	For Mayor, Aldermen and Burgesses of the Borough of Carnarvon.
Unknown date	Penelope Paul	Barge	I. J. Abdela & Mitchell Ltd.	Queensferry	United Kingdom	For Baul Bros. Ltd.
Unknown date	Razmak	Passenger ship	Harland and Wolff	Greenock	United Kingdom	For Peninsular and Oriental Steam Navigation Company
Unknown date	Rigel	Cargo ship	Burmeister & Wain Maskin og Skibsbyggeri	Copenhagen	Denmark	For Det Bergenske Dampskibsselskab
Unknown date	Salmonpool	Cargo ship	Irvines Shipbuilding & Drydock Co. Ltd.	West Hartlepool	United Kingdom	For Sir R. Ropner & Sons.
Unknown date	Salvore	Cargo ship	Stabilimento Tecnico Triestino.	Trieste	Italy	For private owner.
Unknown date	Satellite	Tender	J I Thornycroft & Co Ltd	Woolston	United Kingdom	For Trinity House
Unknown date	Seaman	Tug	Cochrane & Son Ltd.	Selby	United Kingdom	For United Towing Co. Ltd.
Unknown date	T.C.I. No. 10	Barge	Alabama Drydock and Shipbuilding Company	Mobile, Alabama	United States	For Tennessee Coal, Iron and Railroad Company.
Unknown date	T.C.I. No. 11	Barge	Alabama Drydock and Shipbuilding Company	Mobile, Alabama	United States	For Tennessee Coal, Iron and Railroad Company.
Unknown date	T.C.I. No. 12	Barge	Alabama Drydock and Shipbuilding Company	Mobile, Alabama	United States	For Tennessee Coal, Iron and Railroad Company.
Unknown date	T.C.I. No. 13	Barge	Alabama Drydock and Shipbuilding Company	Mobile, Alabama	United States	For Tennessee Coal, Iron and Railroad Company.
Unknown date	T.C.I. No. 14	Barge	Alabama Drydock and Shipbuilding Company	Mobile, Alabama	United States	For Tennessee Coal, Iron and Railroad Company.
Unknown date	T.C.I. No. 15	Barge	Alabama Drydock and Shipbuilding Company	Mobile, Alabama	United States	For Tennessee Coal, Iron and Railroad Company.
Unknown date	T.C.I. No. 16	Barge	Alabama Drydock and Shipbuilding Company	Mobile, Alabama	United States	For Tennessee Coal, Iron and Railroad Company.
Unknown date	T.C.I. No. 17	Barge	Alabama Drydock and Shipbuilding Company	Mobile, Alabama	United States	For Tennessee Coal, Iron and Railroad Company.
Unknown date	Tullochmoor	Cargo ship	Blyth Shipbuilding & Drydock Co. Ltd.	Blyth	United Kingdom	For private owner.
Unknown date	Yale	Passenger ship	New Jersey Transportation & Drydock Co	Wilmington, Delaware	United States	
Unknown date	Zodiac	Schooner			United States	For William H. Hand, Jr.
