= ST Empire Doreen (1946) =

Two tugs launched in 1946 were intended to be named, Empire Doreen

- ST Empire Doreen (1946, Cochrane), laid down as Empire Doreen, launched as Nirumund.
- ST Empire Doreen (1946, Scott), laid down as Empire Doreen, launched as Empire Hedda
