= MV Kollbjørg =

A number of motor vessels were named Kollbjørg, including

- MV Kollbjørg (1937), a Norwegian tanker in service 1937–43
- MV Kollbjørg (1941), a Norwegian tanker in service 1946–56
- MV Kollbjørg (1959), a Norwegian cargo ship in service until at least 1965
