= Glanrhyd =

Glanrhyd may refer to:

- Glanrhyd, Pembrokeshire, Wales
- Glanrhyd Bridge collapse, the collapse of a railway bridge over the River Towy in 1987 which killed four people on a passenger train
- Glanrhyd Hospital, Pen-y-fai, Bridgend
- SS Glanrhyd, a number of ships with this name
