= MV Empire Comet =

World War II merchant ship of the United Kingdom

History
- Name: Empire Comet
- Owner: Ministry of War Transport
- Operator: Dodd, Thompson & Co
- Port of registry: (United Kingdom) Greenock
- Builder: Lithgows Ltd
- Yard number: 941
- Launched: 21 November 1940
- Completed: January 1941
- Identification: Code Letter GPFU; United Kingdom Official Number 166990
- Fate: Sunk 17 February 1942

General characteristics
- Type: Cargo ship
- Tonnage: 6,914 GRT; 4,162 NRT
- Length: 432 ft 7 in (131.85 m)
- Beam: 56 ft 2 in (17.12 m)
- Depth: 34 ft 3 in (10.44 m)
- Installed power: 4SCSA diesel engine
- Propulsion: Screw propeller
- Crew: 38, plus 8 DEMS gunners

Location of the sinking of Empire Comet.

Empire Comet was a 6,914 GRT cargo ship that was built in 1940 by Lithgows Ltd, Port Glasgow for the Ministry of War Transport (MoWT). She was torpedoed and sunk by U-136 in June 1941.

== Description ==
Empire Comet was built by Lithgows Ltd, Port Glasgow as yard number 941. She was launched on 21 November 1940, and completed in January 1941.

Empire Comet was 432 feet 7 inches (131.85 m) long, with a beam of 56 feet 2 inches (17.12 m) and a depth of 34 feet 3 inches (10.44 m). She had a GRT of 6,914 and a NRT of 4,162.Empire Comet was propelled by a 4-stroke Single Cycle Single Acting diesel engine, which had eight cylinders of 29 1/8 inches (74 cm) diameter by 59 1/16 (151 cm) stroke. The engine was built by J G Kincaid & Co Ltd, Greenock.

== History ==
Empire Comet was built for the MoWT. She was placed under the management of Dodd, Thompson & Co Ltd. Her port of registry was Greenock. She was allocated the United Kingdom Official Number 166990 and Code Letters GPFU were allocated.

Empire Comet was a member of a number of convoys during the Second World War.

HX 118

Convoy HX 118 departed Halifax, Nova Scotia on 31 March 1941 and arrived at Liverpool on 18 April. Empire Comet was carrying a cargo of wheat.

HX 174

Convoy HX 174 departed Halifax on 7 February 1942 bound for Liverpool. Empire Comet was carrying a cargo of linseed, manganese ore, peanuts and tea. She had departed from Bombay, India on 12 November 1940 and sailed via Table Bay, South Africa and Halifax. She was bound for Manchester. Empire Comet straggled behind the convoy. At 22:17 (German time) on 17 February 1942, Empire Comet was hit by two torpedoes fired by the German submarine U-136 under the command of Heinrich Zimmerman. She sank at 58°15′N 17°10′W. All 38 crew and eight DEMS gunners were lost. The crew are commemorated on panel 39 of the Tower Hill Memorial, London.
