= USS Wassuc (CMc-3) =

US Navy minelayer

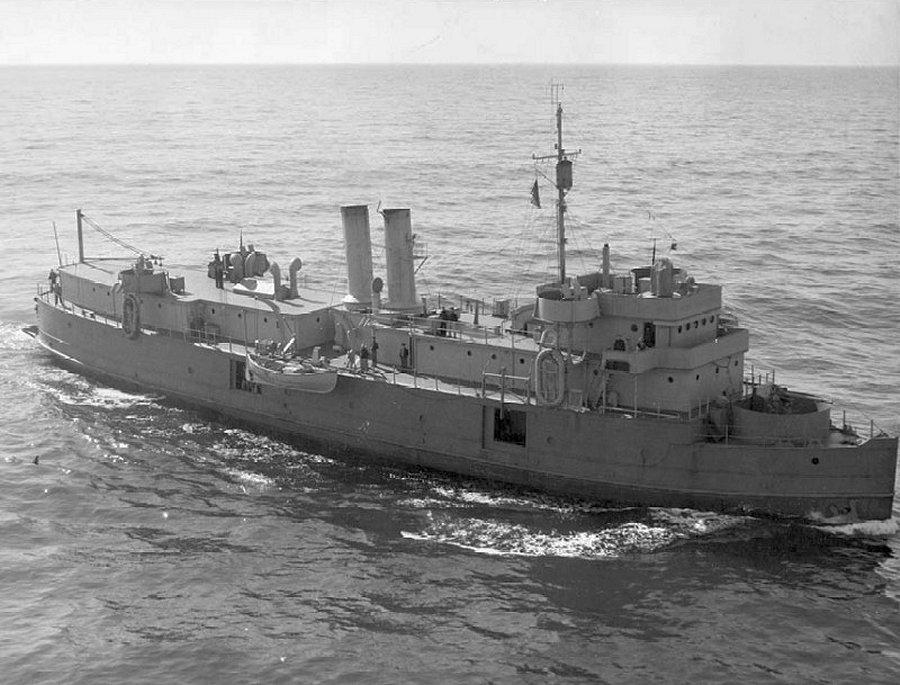

History

United States
- Name: USS Wassuc
- Builder: New Jersey Drydock and Transportation Co., Elizabethport, New Jersey
- Launched: 1924, as SS Yale
- Acquired: by the US Navy, 20 December 1940
- Commissioned: 15 May 1941
- Decommissioned: 8 November 1945
- Renamed: Wassuc , 10 January 1941
- Reclassified: CMc-3, 30 December 1940
- Fate: Sold for scrap, 1948

General characteristics
- Type: Cargo ship / Auxiliary minelayer
- Displacement: 1,830 long tons (1,859 t) full load
- Length: 230 ft 6 in (70.26 m)
- Beam: 42 ft (13 m)
- Draft: 10 ft (3.0 m) max.
- Speed: 13 knots (24 km/h; 15 mph)
- Complement: 85
- Armament: 1 × 3 in (76 mm) gun; 4 × .50 cal (12.7 mm) machine guns

USS Wassuc (CMc-3), originally a steel-hulled, coastal passenger vessel built in 1924 at Elizabethport, New Jersey, by the New Jersey Drydock and Transportation Corp. of New York City as SS Yale, was acquired by the U.S. Navy on 20 December 1940. SS Yale then began conversion to a coastal minelayer at the New York Navy Yard. Classified CMc-3 on 30 December 1940 and renamed USS Wassuc on 10 January 1941, the ship was commissioned at the New York Navy Yard on 15 May 1941.

== East Coast operations ==
After commissioning, USS Wassuc proceeded south; touched at Norfolk, Virginia; and then sailed back northward to the Washington Navy Yard where she arrived on 4 June. She subsequently moved to the Mine Warfare School at Yorktown, Virginia, on 23 June, where she relieved USS Cormorant (AM-40), freeing that minesweeper to begin an overhaul. During her service at Yorktown, Wassuc participated in experimental mine work under the aegis of the Bureau of Ordnance (BuOrd).

Completing that tour in mid-August, Wassuc moved to the Marine Basin at Brooklyn, New York, for extensive alterations that were not completed until after the Japanese attack on Pearl Harbor had plunged the United States into World War II. Two days after Christmas of 1941, Wassuc departed Tompkinsville, Staten Island, New York, bound for Yorktown, Virginia, to receive mine warfare instruction duties and further work under the auspices of BuOrd.

Wassuc spent the next two years operating in the 5th Naval District, primarily plying the waters of the Chesapeake Bay region and occasionally ranging as far north as the Washington Navy Yard and as far south as Cape Hatteras. She operated principally in BuOrd testing programs at the Naval Mine Warfare Proving Grounds at Solomons Island, Maryland, and at Yorktown, Virginia. She also served two tours of duty as a training ship, providing instruction for officers in the compensation of magnetic compasses. Although her duties appear to have been largely experimental and test-oriented, records indicate that the ship laid a small minefield off Cape Hatteras on 22 May 1942.

By 1944, Wassuc was the only coastal minelayer on the U.S. Navy inventory. The U.S. Army held primary responsibility for defensive coastal minelaying, and submarines and aircraft were proving superbly capable of carrying mine warfare to enemy shores. Nevertheless, Wassuc continued her undramatic but vital experimental and test work, far from the limelight of the far-flung battlefronts. She continued her coastwise routine, ranging from Provincetown, Massachusetts, and Cape May, New Jersey, to New York and Norfolk, Virginia, as well as Solomons Island, through the end of World War II.

== Decommissioning ==
Decommissioned at the Norfolk Navy Yard on 8 November 1945 and struck from the Navy list on 28 November 1945, the U.S. Navy's last coastal minelayer was sold to the Patapsco Scrap Corp. on 3 August 1948 for scrapping.
