= SS Marietta (1943) =

History
- Name: Empire Daring (1943-46); Marietta (1946-59)
- Owner: Ministry of War Transport (1943-45); Ministry of Transport (1945-46); Leith Hill Shipping Co Ltd (1946-59)
- Operator: J Morrison & Son (1943-46); Counties Ship Management Ltd (1946-58); Phoecian Ship Agency Ltd (1948-59)
- Port of registry: Greenock, United Kingdom
- Builder: William Hamilton & Co Ltd
- Yard number: 459
- Launched: 29 June 1943
- Completed: August 1943
- Maiden voyage: 23 August 1943
- Out of service: 1959
- Identification: United Kingdom Official Number 169506; Code Letters BFJR
- Fate: Scrapped

General characteristics
- Type: Cargo ship
- Tonnage: 7,059 GRT; 4,801 NRT
- Length: 423 ft 4 in (129.03 m)
- Beam: 56 ft 2 in (17.12 m)
- Depth: 34 ft 2 in (10.41 m)
- Propulsion: Triple expansion steam engine
- Armament: Anti-torpedo nets (1943-45)

Marietta was a 7,059 GRT cargo ship that was built in 1943 as Empire Daring by William Hamilton & Co Ltd, Port Glasgow, United Kingdom for the Ministry of War Transport (MoWT). She served in the Mediterranean and then in home waters during World War II. Empire Daring was sold into merchant service in 1946 and renamed Marietta, serving until she was scrapped in 1959.

== Description ==
The ship was built in 1943 by William Hamilton & Co Ltd, Port Glasgow. She was yard number 459.

The ship was 423 feet 4 inches (129.03 m) long, with a beam of 56 feet 2 inches (17.12 m). She had a depth of 34 feet 2 inches (10.41 m) and a draught of 26 feet 6 inches (8.08 m). She was assessed at 7,059 GRT. 4,801 NRT.

The ship was propelled by a triple expansion steam engine, which had cylinders of 24 1/2 inches (62 cm), 39 inches (99 cm) and 70 inches (180 cm) diameter by 48 inches (120 cm) stroke. The engine was built by D Rowan & Co Ltd, Glasgow.

== History ==
=== World War II ===
Empire Daring was built for the MoWT. The United Kingdom Official Number 169506 and Code Letters BFJR were allocated. Her port of registry was Greenock. She was placed under the management of J Morrison & Co Ltd.

Empire Daring departed from the Clyde on her maiden voyage on 23 August 1943, sailing to Cairnryan, Wigtownshire and returning to the Clyde on 1 September. She departed from the Clyde on 18 September to join Convoy OS 55 km, which departed from Liverpool, Lancashire on 17 September and split at sea on 28 September. Empire Daring was carrying stores and vehicles, and was equipped with anti-torpedo nets. She was in the portion of the convoy that became Convoy KMS 27G, which arrived at Gibraltar on 29 September. She departed Gibraltar that day as a member of Convoy KMS 27, which arrived at Port Said, Egypt on 11 October. She left the convoy at Algiers, Algeria on 2 October.

Empire Daring spent the next seven months sailing the Mediterranean, visiting Bougie, Algeria; Alexandria and Port Said, Egypt; Augusta, Bari, Naples and Taranto Italy; and Casablanca, Morocco. On 1 May 1944, she departed from Casablanca to join Convoy SL 156, which had departed from Freetown, Sierra Leone on 21 April. The convoy rendezvoused with Convoy MKS 47 at sea on 3 May, and the combined convoys arrived at Liverpool on 13 May. Empire Daring left the convoy at the Clyde on 12 May. She departed the Clyde on 6 June for London, arriving a week later. She then spent the next four months sailing in convoys between Southend, Essex and the Seine Bay, France, with a single return trip to Methil in September 1944. She participated in Operation Overlord, taking a cargo of armaments to one of the Mulberry harbours.

From the end in November 1944, Empire Daring sailed in various convoys to and from ports around the United Kingdom and also to Antwerp and Bruges in Belgium and Terneuzen, the Netherlands. She was at Antwerp when the war ended. On 29 April 1945, one of her firemen was killed.

=== Post-war ===
Empire Daring made a round trip to Southend. Her last convoy was Convoy ATM 171, which departed from Antwerp on 31 May 1945 and arrived at Southend the next day. She then visited Hull and Rotterdam, Netherlands before returning to Sothend and sailing to the Tyne. On 10 July, she departed the Tyne for New Orleans, Louisiana, United States arriving on 1 August. She departed New Orleans on 13 August, sailing via Cape Henry, Virginia to London, where she arrived on 2 September. From October, Empire Daring sailed the Mediterranean, visiting Aden; Port Said and Suez, Egypt; Abadan, Iran; Basra, Iraq; and Haifa, Palestine.

In 1946, Empire Daring was sold to Leith Hill Shipping Co Ltd and was renamed Marietta. She was placed under the management of Counties Ship Management Ltd, London. In 1948, management was transferred to Phoecian Ship Agency Ltd, London. In 1958, Marietta was sold to Bury Hill Shipping Co Ltd, remaining under Phoecian's management. She was scrapped in 1959 in Split, Yugoslavia.
