= SS Belgian Sailor =

1941 cargo ship

History
- Name: Empire Drayton (1941–42); Belgian Sailor (1942–46); Capitaine Biebuyck (1946–57); Kastav (1957–65); Ivory Tellus (1965–70)
- Owner: Ministry of War Transport (1941–42); Belgian Government (1942–46); Compagnie Maritime Belge (1946–57); Yugoslav Government (1957–65); Ivory Shipping Co Ltd (1965–70)
- Operator: Headlam & Son (1942); Compagnie Maritime Belge (1942– ); Agence Maritime Internationale ( –1946); Lloyd Royal Belge (1946–57); Kvarnerska Plovidba (1957–63); Jugoslavenska Linijska Plovidba (1963–65); Aries Shipping Co Ltd (1965–68); Unimar Seetransport GmbH (1968–70)
- Port of registry: (United Kingdom) Newcastle upon Tyne, UK (1941–42); Antwerp, Belgium (1942–58); (Socialist Federal Republic of Yugoslavia) Rijeka, Yugoslavia (1958–65); Monrovia, Liberia (1965–68); Beirut, Lebanon (1968–70)
- Builder: Swan, Hunter & Wigham Richardson Ltd
- Yard number: 1641
- Launched: 23 October 1941
- Completed: February 1942
- Out of service: 22 April 1970
- Identification: United Kingdom Official Number 165826 (1941–42); IMO number: 5183223 ( –1970); Call sign 6ZOY ( –1970)
- Fate: Scrapped

General characteristics
- Type: Cargo ship
- Tonnage: 7,028 GRT; 5,043 NRT; 10,250 DWT
- Length: 432 ft 5 in (131.80 m)
- Beam: 56 ft 2 in (17.12 m)
- Draught: 26 ft 3 in (8.00 m)
- Depth: 34 ft 2 in (10.41 m)
- Propulsion: Triple expansion steam engine
- Speed: 10.5 knots (19.4 km/h)
- Armament: 1 x 3-inch gun, 1 x 4-inch or 4.7-inch gun (Belgian Sailor)

Belgian Sailor was a 7,028 GRT cargo ship that was built in 1941 as Empire Drayton by Swan, Hunter & Wigham Richardson Ltd, Wallsend, Northumberland, United Kingdom for the Ministry of War Transport (MoWT). In 1942, she was transferred to the Belgian Government and renamed Belgian Sailor. She was sold into merchant service in 1946 and renamed Capitaine Biebuyck. In 1957, she was sold to Yugoslavia and renamed Kastav. A further sale in 1965 to Hong Kong saw her renamed Ivory Tellus, she served until 1970 when she was scrapped.

== Description ==
The ship was built in 1941 by Swan, Hunter & Wigham Richardson Ltd, Wallsend. She was yard number 1641.

The ship was 432 feet 5 inches (131.80 m) long, with a beam of 56 feet 2 inches (17.12 m). She had a depth of 34 feet 2 inches (10.41 m) and a draught of 26 feet 3 inches (8.00 m).^{[Note 1]} She was assessed at 7,028 GRT. 5,023 NRT. Her DWT was 10,250.

The ship was propelled by a triple expansion steam engine. could propel the ship at 10.5 knots (19.4 km/h).

== History ==
=== World War II ===
Empire Drayton was launched on 23 October 1941 and completed in February 1942. She was allocated the United Kingdom Official Number 168523. Her port of registry was Newcastle upon Tyne and she was operated under the management of Headlam & Son.

Empire Drayton was transferred to the Belgian Government shortly after completion. She was placed under the management of Compagnie Maritime Belge SA, but would later be managed by Agence Maritime Internationale. She departed from the Tyne on 10 March 1942 to join Convoy FN 651, which had departed from Southend, Essex the previous day and arrived at Methil, Fife on 11 March. She then joined Convoy EN 58, which departed on 13 March and arrived at Oban, Argyllshire on 16 March. Belgian Sailor left the convoy at Loch Ewe and sailed to New York, United States, where she arrived on 2 April. She departed from New York on 28 April for Cape Town, South Africa, arriving on 4 June. Over the next four months, Belgian Sailor made a round trip to Alexandria, Egypt, calling at Durban, Aden, Port Sudan, Suez and Port Said on the outward voyage, and Port Said, Suez, Aden and Lourenço Marques, Mozambique on the return voyage. She arrived back at Cape Town on 14 October.

Belgian Sailor departed from Cape Town on 19 November for Trinidad, arriving on 20 December and departing ten days later for Guantanamo Bay, Cuba, where she arrived on 7 January 1943. She was a member of Convoy GN 34, which departed on 9 January and arrived at New York a week later. She then joined Convoy SC 119, which departed on 3 February and arrived at Liverpool, Lancashire on 22 February. She was carrying a cargo of wheat. Belgian Sailor left the convoy at the Clyde on 21 February.

Belgian Sailor was a member of Convoy ON 171, which departed from Liverpool on 4 March and arrived at Halifax, Nova Scotia, Canada on 23 March. She then joined Convoy HF 44, which departed on 25 March and arrived at Saint John, New Brunswick on 27 March. Belgian Sailor departed from Saint John on 7 April as a member of Convoy FH 47, which arrived at Halifax two days later. She returned to the United Kingdom with Convoy SC 127, which departed on 16 April and arrived at Liverpool on 16 May. She was carrying a cargo described as grain and "fads", as well as one passenger. She left the convoy at Loch Ewe on 2 May, and joined Convoy WN 423, which departedon 4 May and arrived at Methil two days later. She then joined Convoy FS 1108, which departed that day and arrived at Southend on 8 May.

Belgian Sailor was a member of Convoy FN 1025, which departed from Southend on 19 May and arrived at Methil two days later. She left the convoy at Sunderland the next day, departing two days later for Methil, where she arrived on 23 May. Belgian Sailor then joined Convoy EN 233, which departed the next day and arrived at Loch Ewe on 26 May. She then joined Convoy ON 187, which departed from Liverpool on 1 June and arrived at New York on 15 June. She left the convoy at Halifax, where she arrived on 13 June. A return trip to Saint John was made via convoys HF 60 and FH 64. Belgian Sailor joined Convoy HX 247, which had departed from New York on 8 July and arrived at Liverpool on 22 July. She was carrying a cargo of armoured fighting vehicles, flour and grain. She left the convoy at Loch Ewe on 22 July and sailed to Southend via convoys WN 457A and FS 1178, arriving on 28 July.

Belgian Sailor departed from Southend on 16 August for Loch Ewe, which was reached via Convoy FN 1101 to the Tyne, Convoy FN 1104 to Methil and Convoy EN 271 to Loch Ewe, arriving on 23 August. She then joined Convoy ON 199, which departed from Liverpool on 26 August and arrived at New York on 9 September. She left the convoy at Halifax, arriving on 8 September. She departed the next day as a member of Convoy HS 106, which arrived at Sydney, Cape Breton on 11 September, from where she sailed to Montreal, Quebec, arriving on 14 September. Belgian Sailor departed from Montreal on 24 September for Sydney, arriving three days later. She then joined Convoy SC 143, which had departed from Halifax on 28 September, with the Sydney contingent departing on 29 September. The convoy arrived at Liverpool on 12 October. Belgian Sailor was carrying a cargo of lumber, steel, phosphorus and woodpulp, destined for London. She left the convoy at Loch Ewe on 12 October, reaching London via convoys WN 492, and FS 1242, arriving at Southend on 16 October.

Belgian Sailor departed from Southend on 9 November for Loch Ewe via Middlesbrough, Yorkshire; and as a member of convoys FN 1174, FN 1184 and EN 310. She arrived at Loch Ewe on 25 November. She loaded a cargo of stores at Aultbea, Ross-shire and joined Convoy KMS 34G, which departed from Liverpool on 25 November and arrived at Gibraltar on 9 December. Armament was recorded as a 3-inch and a 4 or 4.7-inch gun. Her destination was Bône, Algeria. Ships in Convoy OS 60 were also in this convoy until 7 December, when the two convoys parted company, with OS 60 continuing to Freetown, Sierra Leone, where it arrived on 18 December. Belgian Sailor passed Gibraltar on 9 December as a member of convoy KMS 34, which arrived at Port Said on 20 December. She arrived at Bône on 12 December.

Belgian Sailor departed from Bône on 9 January 1944, spending the next five months sailing the Mediterranean, always as a member of a convoy. Ports called at were Algiers, Bône and Oran, Algeria; Alexandria, Egypt; Augusta, Naples and Taranto, Italy; and Bizerta, Tunisia. She departed from Oran on 19 May to join Convoy MKS 49G, which departed from Gibraltar on 20 May and rendezvoused with Convoy SL 158 at sea the next day. She was carrying a cargo of vehicles as well as 153 passengers, destined for Loch Ewe. The combined convoy arrived at Liverpool on 4 June. Belgian Sailor arrived at Loch Ewe on 4 June, and then sailed to Hull, Yorkshire via convoys WN 592 and FS 1477, arriving on 9 June.

Belgian Sailor departed from Hull on 18 June, joining Convoy FN 1392, which had departed from Southend the previous day and arrived at Methil on 20 June. She then joined Convoy EN 399 which arrived at Loch Ewe on 22 June and then sailed to Montreal, arriving on 10 July. Belgian Sailor departed from Montreal on 23 July and sailed to Sydney, arriving two days later. Laden with timber, she departed from Sydney on 6 August to join Convoy HX 302, which had departed from New York on 3 August and arrived at Liverpool on 17 August. She returned to Sydney, arriving back there the same day. She departed from Sydney on 13 August to join Convoy HX 303, which had departed from New York on 8 August and arrived at Liverpool on 27 August. Her destination was given as West Hartlepool, Co Durham. She left the convoy at Loch Ewe on 27 August. West Hartlepool was reached on 1 September via convoys WN 626 and FS 1560.

Belgian Sailor departed from West Hartlepool on or about 22 September, joining Convoy FN 1487, which had departed from Southend on 21 September and arrived at Methil on 23 September. She departed from Methil on 26 September as a member of Convoy EN 440, which arrived at Loch Ewe on 29 September. Belgian Sailor then sailed to Halifax, from where she joined Convoy XB 192A, which departed on 12 October and arrived at the Cape Cod Canal, Massachusetts on 15 October. Her destination was New York, where she arrived the next day. Belgian Sailor departed from New York on 1 November and sailed to Boston, Massachusetts. She then joined Convoy BX 132, which departed on 7 November and arrived at Halifax two days later. She then joined Convoy SC 161, which departed on 17 November and arrived at Liverpool on 4 December. Belgian Sailor was carrying general cargo and lorries, destined for Southend. She left the convoy at Loch Ewe on 5 December, reaching Southend on 9 December via Convoys WN 659 and FS 1659. A return voyage was made to Antwerp, Belgium via convoys TAM 14 and ATM 19 before Belgian Sailor joined Convoy TBC 18, which departed from Southend on 25 December and arrived at Milford Haven, Pembrokeshire on 28 December. She arrived at the Barry Roads on 27 December.

Belgian Sailor departed from Milford Haven on January 9, 1945 for the Belfast Lough, arriving the next day. She then joined Convoy ONS 40, which departed from Liverpool on 12 January and arrived at Halifax on January 30. New York was reached on 2 February via Convoy XB 144, which departed from Halifax on 29 January and arrived at the Cape Cod Canal on 1 February. Belgian Sailor was a member of Convoy NG 489, which departed from New York on 10 February and arrived at Guantanamo Bay, Cuba on 17 February. She then joined Convoy GAT 191, which departed that day and arrived at Trinidad on 23 February. She left the convoy at San Pedro de Macorís, Dominican Republic on 19 February. Belgian Sailor then sailed to Boca Chica, from where she departed on 4 March for Guantanamo Bay, arriving on 6 March. She was one of three ships that formed Convoy GN 192, which departed on 9 March and arrived at New York on 15 March. She departed from New York on 21 March and sailed to Boston, from where she departed on 23 March as a member of Convoy BX 152, which arrived at Halifax on 25 March. Belgian Sailor then joined Convoy SC 171, which departed on 27 March and arrived at Liverpool on 10 April. She was carrying a cargo of sugar. Belgian Sailor was a member of Convoy ONS48, which departed from Liverpool on 21 April and arrived at Halifax on 4 May. she left the convoy and sailed to Montreal, arriving on 6 May.

=== Post-war ===
Belgian Sailor departed from Montreal on May 17, 1945 and sailed to Sydney, arriving three days later. She sailed on May 27 to join Convoy SC 177, which had departed from Halifax that day and arrived at Liverpool on 8 June. Her cargo consisted grain, oats and rye. She sailed on to The Downs, off the coast of Kent, arriving on 8 June and departing the next day for Antwerp.

Belgian Sailor departed from Antwerp on 9 June for Sydney, where she arrived on July first, leaving the next day for Montreal. She departed from Montreal on 18 July and arrived back at Antwerp on 31 July. She departed from Antwerp on 8 August for Falmouth, Cornwall, arriving on 12 August and departing on August 28thmfor Montreal, where she arrived on 9 September. Belgian Sailor departed from Montreal on 16 September and arrived at Antwerp on 29 September. On 13 October, she departed for Trois Rivières, Quebec, Canada, arriving on 28 October and departing on 5 November for Antwerp, where she arrived on 21 November.

On 21 January 1946, Belgian Sailor was sold to Compagnie Maritime Belge and renamed Capitaine Biebuyck. She was operated under the management of Lloyd Royal Belge. On 18 December 1957, Capitaine Biebuyck was sold to the Yugoslav Government and renamed Kastav. Her port of registry was Rijeka. She was operated under the management of Kvarnerska Plovidba until 1963, when management was transferred to Jugoslavenska Linijska Plovidba.

In 1965, Kastav was sold to the Ivory Shipping Co Ltd, Hong Kong and renamed Ivory Tellus. She was operated under the management of Aires Shipping Co Ltd, Hong Kong. The ship was placed under the Liberian flag, with Monrovia as her port of registry. In March 1968, Ivory Tellus was reflagged to Lebanon, with Beirut as her homeport. Management was transferred to Unimar Seetransport GmbH, Hamburg, West Germany. IMO Numbers had been introduced by then, and she was allocated IMO 5183223, her call sign was 6ZOY. She was in service until 1970, arriving on 22 April at Hirao, Japan for scrapping, which was done by Matsukura Maritime Co Ltd.

== Notes ==
1. See rationale on talk page for validity of this source.
