= MV Empire Drum =

World War II merchant ship of the United Kingdom

History
- Name: Empire Drum
- Owner: Ministry of War Transport
- Operator: Chellew Navigation Co Ltd
- Port of registry: Sunderland, United Kingdom
- Builder: William Doxford & Sons Ltd
- Yard number: 684
- Launched: 19 November 1941
- Completed: March 1942
- Out of service: 24 April 1942
- Identification: United Kingdom Official Number 169012
- Fate: Sunk, 24 April 1942

General characteristics
- Type: Cargo ship
- Tonnage: 7,244 GRT; 10,262 DWT
- Length: 429 ft (131 m)
- Beam: 56 ft (17 m)
- Installed power: 516 nhp
- Propulsion: Diesel engine
- Speed: 11.5 knots (21.3 km/h)
- Crew: 35, plus 6 DEMS gunners
- Armament: 4.7-inch gun, six machine guns

Location where Empire Drum was torpedoed and sunk off the coast of the United States.

Empire Drum was a 7,244 GRT cargo ship that was built in 1941 by William Doxford & Sons Ltd, Sunderland, Co Durham, United Kingdom for the Ministry of War Transport (MoWT). Completed in March 1942, she had a short career, being torpedoed and sunk on 24 April 1942 by U-136.

== Description ==
The ship was built in 1942 by William Doxford & Sons Ltd, Sunderland. She was yard number 684.

The ship was 429 feet (131 m) long, with a beam of 56 feet (17 m). She was assessed at 7,244 GRT. Her DWT was 10,282.

The ship was propelled by a 516 nhp diesel engine. It could propel her at 11.5 knots (21.3 km/h).

== History ==
Empire Drum was launched on 19 September 1941 and completed in March 1942. The United Kingdom Official Number 169002 was allocated. Her port of registry was Sunderland and she was placed under the management of Chellew Navigation Co Ltd, Cardiff, Glamorgan. She had a crew of 41. Armament consisted a 4.7-inch gun and six machine guns.

Empire Drum departed from Sunderland on 13 March for the Tyne. She made her maiden voyage on 15 March as a member of Convoy FN 655, which had departed from Southend, Essex the previous day and arrived at Methil, Fife on 16 March. The ship was in ballast. She departed from Methil on 18 March as a member of Convoy EN 60, which arrived at Oban, Argyllshire on 20 March. Empire Drum returned to Methil with defects. Defects rectified, she joined Convoy EN 61, which departed on 20 March and arrived at Oban two days later. She then sailed to Loch Ewe. Empire Drum then sailed to Liverpool, Lancashire to join Convoy ON 79, which departed on 23 March and arrived at Halifax, Nova Scotia, Canada on 7 April. Her destination was New York, United States, where she arrived on 7 April.

Empire Drum was loaded with a cargo of 6,000 long tons (6,100 t) of military stores, including a quantity of tyres and 1,270 long tons (1,290 t) of explosives. She departed from New York on 23 April bound for Alexandria, Egypt via Cape Town, South Africa. At 23:48 (German time) on 24 April, U-136, under the command of Heinrich Zimmerman, fired two torpedoes at Empire Drum, which was then 280 nautical miles (520 km) south east of New York (37°00′N 69°15′W). One of them hit in her No. 1 hold on the port side, causing the ship to sink by the bow. All 35 crew and six DEMS gunners abandoned ship and took to the four lifeboats due to the nature of her cargo. At 00:08 on 25 April, U-136 fired a coup de grâce which hit amidships on the port side. Empire Drum quickly sank but the explosion wrecked one lifeboat, throwing its four occupants into the sea. They were rescued by one of the other lifeboats. U-136 surfaced and the survivors on board one of the lifeboats were questioned before the submarine left the scene.

The sea conditions were slight, with a good breeze blowing. At daybreak the lifeboats headed west. One lifeboat, containing the captain and 13 crew was spotted by the Swedish merchant ship Venezia on 26 April. The survivors were landed at New York the next day. The survivors on board second lifeboat, containing the chief officer and 13 crew were rescued by USS Roper on 29 April, having been spotted at 37°47′N 71°28′W by an aircraft. The survivors on board the third lifeboat were rescued by USS Roper on 1 May. They were just 15 nautical miles (28 km) off the coast of the United States, having sailed for 265 nautical miles (491 km). Those rescued by USS Roper were landed at Norfolk, Virginia on 1 May.
