= SS Glanrhyd =

A number of steamships were named Glanrhyd, including:

- SS Glanrhyd (1924), a collier in service 1924–38
- SS Glanrhyd (1943), a collier in service 1946–48
