= German submarine U-136 (1941) =

German World War II submarine

Coordinates: 33°30′N 22°52′W

History

Nazi Germany
- Name: U-136
- Ordered: 7 August 1939
- Builder: Bremer Vulkan, Bremen-Vegesack
- Yard number: 15
- Laid down: 2 October 1940
- Launched: 5 July 1941
- Commissioned: 30 August 1941
- Fate: Sunk, 11 July 1942

General characteristics
- Class & type: Type VIIC submarine
- Displacement: 769 tonnes (757 long tons) surfaced; 871 t (857 long tons) submerged
- Length: 67.10 m (220 ft 2 in) o/a; 50.50 m (165 ft 8 in) pressure hull
- Beam: 6.20 m (20 ft 4 in) o/a; 4.70 m (15 ft 5 in) pressure hull
- Height: 9.60 m (31 ft 6 in)
- Installed power: 2,800–3,200 PS (2,100–2,400 kW; 2,800–3,200 bhp) (diesels); 750 PS (550 kW; 740 shp) (electric)
- Propulsion: 2 shafts; 2 × diesel engines; 2 × electric motors
- Speed: 17.7 knots (32.8 km/h; 20.4 mph) surfaced; 7.6 knots (14.1 km/h; 8.7 mph) submerged
- Range: 8,500 nmi (15,700 km; 9,800 mi) at 10 knots (19 km/h; 12 mph) surfaced; 80 nmi (150 km; 92 mi) at 4 knots (7.4 km/h; 4.6 mph) submerged
- Test depth: 230 m (750 ft); Calculated crush depth: 250–295 m (820–968 ft)
- Complement: 4 officers, 40–56 enlisted
- Armament: 5 × 53.3 cm (21 in) torpedo tubes (four bow, one stern); 14 × torpedoes or 26 TMA mines; 1 × 8.8 cm (3.46 in) deck gun (220 rounds); various AA guns

Service record
- Part of: 6th U-boat Flotilla; 30 August 1941 – 11 July 1942
- Identification codes: M 00 518
- Commanders: Kptlt. Heinrich Zimmermann; 30 August 1941 – 11 July 1942
- Operations: 3 patrols: 1st patrol: a. 22 – 24 January 1942; b. 26 – 28 January 1942; c. 30 January – 1 March 1942; 2nd patrol: 24 March – 20 May 1942; 3rd patrol: 29 June – 11 July 1942
- Victories: 5 merchant ships sunk (23,649 GRT); 2 warships sunk (1,850 tons); 1 merchant ship damaged (8,955 GRT)

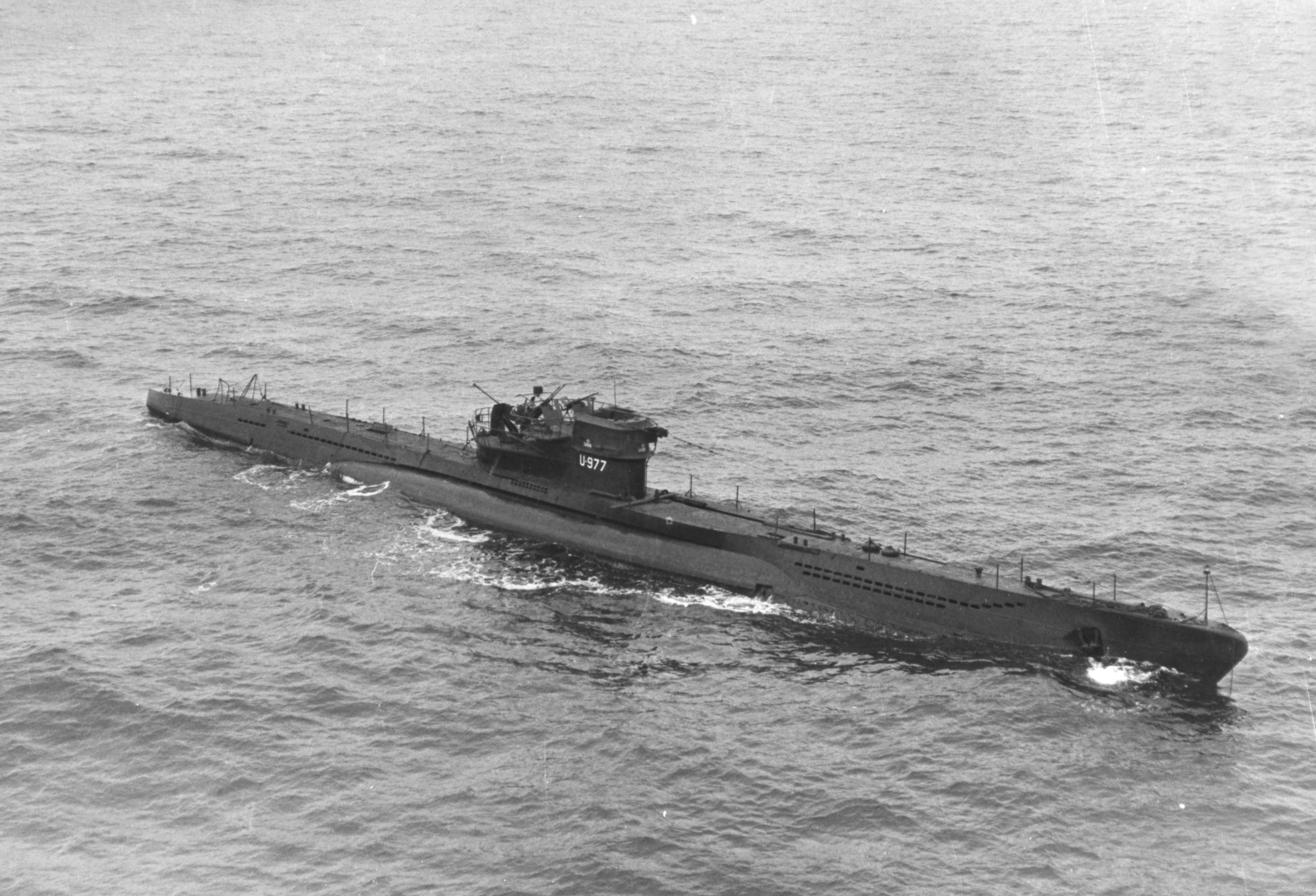
German submarine U-977 as a target ship off Cape Cod, Massachusetts (USA), 13 November 1946

German submarine U-136 was a Type VIIC U-boat of Nazi Germany's Kriegsmarine during World War II.

She was laid down at Vulkan-Vegesackerwerft in Bremen on 2 October 1940 as yard number 15, launched on 5 July 1941, and commissioned on 30 August with Kapitänleutnant Heinrich Zimmermann in command.

Her service career began with the commencement of crew training with the 6th U-boat Flotilla on her commissioning date. She became operational on 1 January 1942, also with the 6th flotilla.

She sank five ships with a total of 23,649 gross register tons (GRT) and two warships totalling 1,850 tons. She also damaged one ship of 8,955 GRT.

== Design ==
German Type VIIC submarines were preceded by the shorter Type VIIB submarines. U-136 had a displacement of 769 tonnes (757 long tons) when at the surface and 871 tonnes (857 long tons) while submerged. She had a total length of 67.10 m (220 ft 2 in), a pressure hull length of 50.50 m (165 ft 8 in), a beam of 6.20 m (20 ft 4 in), a height of 9.60 m (31 ft 6 in), and a draught of 4.74 m (15 ft 7 in). The submarine was powered by two MAN M6V 40/46 four-stroke, six-cylinder supercharged diesel engines producing a total of 2,800 to 3,200 metric horsepower (2,060 to 2,350 kW; 2,760 to 3,160 shp) for use while surfaced and two Brown, Boveri & Cie GG UB 720/8 double-acting electric motors producing a total of 750 metric horsepower (550 kW; 740 shp) for use while submerged. She had two shafts and two 1.23 m (4 ft) propellers. The boat was capable of operating at depths of up to 230 metres (750 ft).

The submarine had a maximum surface speed of 17.7 knots (32.8 km/h; 20.4 mph) and a maximum submerged speed of 7.6 knots (14.1 km/h; 8.7 mph). When submerged, the boat could operate for 80 nautical miles (150 km; 92 mi) at 4 knots (7.4 km/h; 4.6 mph); when surfaced, she could travel 8,500 nautical miles (15,700 km; 9,800 mi) at 10 knots (19 km/h; 12 mph). U-136 was fitted with five 53.3 cm (21 in) torpedo tubes (four fitted at the bow and one at the stern), fourteen torpedoes, one 8.8 cm (3.46 in) SK C/35 naval gun, 220 rounds, and an anti-aircraft gun. The boat had a complement between forty-four and sixty.

== Service history ==
=== First patrol ===
Her first patrol was unusual in that it was divided into three parts. Part one saw the boat depart Kiel on 22 January 1942 and arrive at Kristiansand in Norway on the 24th. Part two was from Kristiansand to Bergen, also in Norway. Part three involved the boat crossing the North Sea and negotiating the passage between the Faroe and Shetland Islands into the Atlantic Ocean. While doing so, she sank HMS Arbutus on 5 February and HMCS Spikenard on the 11th. She also sank MV Empire Comet on the 17th. She then sailed to St. Nazaire in occupied France, arriving on 1 March.

=== Second patrol ===
During U-136's second patrol, the boat damaged Axtell J. Byles off the US North Carolina coast on 19 April 1942 and sank Empire Drum about 280 nmi (520 km; 320 mi) southeast of New York on the 24th. All the crew survived; one of them, the third engineer, was found floating with a part of the ship's cargo tucked under each arm—it was TNT.

=== Third patrol and loss ===
The boat's third and last patrol began with her departure from St. Nazaire on 29 June 1942. On 11 July she was sunk with all hands (45 men), by depth charges from the Free French destroyer Léopard, the British frigate HMS Spey, and the British sloop HMS Pelican west of Madeira.

=== Wolfpacks ===
U-136 took part in two wolfpacks, namely:

- Schlei (1 – 12 February 1942)
- Hai (3 – 11 July 1942)

== Summary of raiding history ==
Date	Name	Nationality	Tonnage (Note: Merchant ship tonnages are in gross register tons. Military vessels are listed by tons displacement.)	Fate
5 February 1942	HMS Arbutus	Royal Navy	925	Sunk
11 February 1942	Heina	Norway	4,028	Sunk
11 February 1942	HMCS Spikenard	Royal Canadian Navy	925	Sunk
17 February 1942	Empire Comet	United Kingdom	6,914	Sunk
19 April 1942	Axtell J. Byles	United States	8,955	Damaged
24 April 1942	Empire Drum	United Kingdom	7,244	Sunk
28 April 1942	Arundo	Netherlands	5,163	Sunk
8 May 1942	Mildred Pauline	Canada	300	Sunk

== Bibliography ==
- Busch, Rainer; Röll, Hans-Joachim (1999). German U-boat commanders of World War II : a biographical dictionary. Translated by Brooks, Geoffrey. London, Annapolis, Md: Greenhill Books, Naval Institute Press. ISBN 1-55750-186-6.
- Busch, Rainer; Röll, Hans-Joachim (1999). Deutsche U-Boot-Verluste von September 1939 bis Mai 1945 [German U-boat losses from September 1939 to May 1945]. Der U-Boot-Krieg (in German). Vol. IV. Hamburg, Berlin, Bonn: Mittler. ISBN 3-8132-0514-2.
- Gröner, Erich; Jung, Dieter; Maass, Martin (1991). U-boats and Mine Warfare Vessels. German Warships 1815–1945. Vol. 2. Translated by Thomas, Keith; Magowan, Rachel. London: Conway Maritime Press. ISBN 0-85177-593-4.
- Kemp, Paul (1999). U-Boats Destroyed - German Submarine Losses in the World Wars. London: Arms & Armour. ISBN 1-85409-515-3.
