= MV Sand Star =

History
- Name: Empire Dyke (1942–43); Prinses Margriet (1943–54); Sand Star (1954-66)
- Owner: Ministry of War Transport (1942–43); Dutch Government (1943–54); South Coast Shipping Co Ltd (1954-66)
- Operator: G Gibson & Co Ltd (1942–43); Netherland Shipping & Trading Committee Ltd (1943–54); South Coast Shipping Co Ltd (1954-56); Wm Cory & Sons Ltd (1956–66)
- Port of registry: (United Kingdom) Newcastle upon Tyne, UK (1942-43); Netherlands (1943-54); United Kingdom (1954-66)
- Builder: Clelands (Successors) Ltd
- Yard number: 56
- Launched: 15 January 1942
- Completed: April 1942
- Out of service: 4 March 1966
- Identification: United Kingdom Official Number 165828 (1942-43, 1954-66); Code Letters BDTK (1942–43)
- Fate: Sank

General characteristics
- Class & type: Coaster (1942–54); Dredger (1954–66)
- Tonnage: 489 GRT; 251 NRT
- Length: 164 ft 7 in (50.17 m)
- Beam: 26 ft 6 in (8.08 m)
- Draught: 10 feet 7 3/4 inches (3.245 m)
- Depth: 20 ft 5 in (6.22 m)
- Installed power: 116 nhp
- Propulsion: 2SCSA Diesel engine
- Crew: 8

Sand Star was a 489 GRT dredger that was built in 1943 as the coaster Empire Dyke Clelands (Successors) Ltd, Wallsend, Northumberland, United Kingdom for the Ministry of War Transport (MoWT). She was transferred to the Netherlands in 1943 and renamed Prinses Margriet. In 1954, she was sold to the United Kingdom and renamed Sand Star. She served until 1966 when she sank following a collision.

== Description ==
The ship was built in 1942 by Clelands (Successors) Ltd, Wallsend, Northumberland. She was yard number 56.

The ship was 164 feet 7 inches (50.17 m) long, with a beam of 26 feet 6 inches (8.08 m). She had a depth of 8 feet 8 inches (2.64 m) and a draught of 10 feet 7 3/4 inches (3.245 m). She was assessed at 489 GRT, 251 NRT.

The ship was propelled by a 116 nhp two-stroke Single Cycle, Single Action diesel engine, which had six cylinders of 10 1/2 inches (270 mm) diameter by 13 1/2 inches (340 mm) stroke driving a single screw propeller. The engine was built by Crossley Bros Ltd, Leeds, Yorkshire.

== History ==
Empire Dyke was built in 1943 by Clelands (Successors) Ltd, Wallsend, Northumberland, for the MoWT. She was completed in April. The United Kingdom Official Number 165828 and Code Letters BDTK were allocated. Her port of registry was Newcastle upon Tyne and she was placed under the management of G Gibson & Co Ltd. Little is known of her wartime service, although she was a member of Convoy FN 808, which departed from Southend, Essex on 8 September 1942 and arrived at Methil, Fife two days later.

In 1943, Empire Dyke was transferred to the Dutch Government and renamed Prinses Margriet. She was placed under the management of the Netherland Shipping & Trading Committee Ltd. In June and July 1944, Prinses Margriet was employed around the south coast of the United Kingdom, sailing in various ETC and FTC convoys.

In 1954, Prinses Margriet was sold to South Coast Shipping Co Ltd and renamed Sand Star. She was placed under the management of Burness Shipping Co Ltd. In 1955, Sand Star was converted to a dredger. Management passed to Wm Cory & Sons Ltd in 1956. On 4 March 1966, Sand Star collided with the 2,100 GRT coaster Caroline M in Southampton Water and sank. All eight crew were rescued by Caroline M. She was raised in May and scrapped in September at Thos. W. Ward Grays, Essex.
