= SS Brick Quinto =

History
- Name: Empire Daughter (1943-46); Glanrhyd (1946-48); Noeldale (1948-49); Kinnaird Head (1949-61); Brick Quinto (1961-76)
- Owner: Ministry of War Transport (1943-45); Ministry of Transport (1945-46); Harries Brothers & Co Ltd (1946-48); Tavistock Shipping Co Ltd (1948-49); Henry & McGregor Ltd (1946-61); Gino Gardella (1961-76)
- Operator: Stephenson, Clarke & Associated Companies Ltd (1943-46); Harries Brothers & Co Ltd (1946-48); Tavistock Shipping Co Ltd (1948-49); Henry & McGregor Ltd (1946-61); Gino Gardella (1961-76)
- Port of registry: Grangemouth, United Kingdom (1944-46); (United Kingdom) Swansea (1946-48); (United Kingdom) London (1948-49); (United Kingdom) Leith (1949-61); Italy (1961-76)
- Builder: Grangemouth Dockyard Co Ltd
- Launched: 27 December 1943
- Completed: April 1944
- Identification: United Kingdom Official Number 169105 (1943-61); Code Letters GCSQ (1944-61)
- Fate: Scrapped

General characteristics
- Type: Cargo ship
- Tonnage: 2,026 GRT; 1,073 NRT>
- Length: 272 ft 0 in (82.91 m)
- Beam: 40 ft 0 in (12.19 m)
- Depth: 17 ft 2 in (5.23 m)
- Propulsion: Triple expansion steam engine

Brick Quinto was a 2,066 GRT collier that was built in 1943 as Empire Daughter by Grangemouth Dockyard Co Ltd, Grangemouth, Stirlingshire, United Kingdom for the Ministry of War Transport (MoWT). In 1946, she was sold into merchant service and renamed Glanrhyd. Further sales in 1948 and 1949 saw her renamed Noeldale and Kinnaird Head respectively. In 1961, she was sold to Italy and renamed Brick Quinto. She served until 1976, when she was scrapped.

== Description ==
The ship was built in 1943 by Grangemouth Dockyard Co Ltd, Grangemouth, Stirlingshire. She was yard number 673.

The ship was 272 feet 0 inches (82.91 m) long, with a beam of 40 feet 0 inches (12.19 m). She had a depth of 17 feet 5 inches (5.31 m) She was assessed at 2,066 GRT. 1,073 NRT.

The ship was propelled by a triple expansion steam engine, which had cylinders of 17 inches (43 cm), 27 inches (69 cm) and 48 inches (120 cm) diameter by 36 inches (91 cm) stroke. The engine was built by North East Marine Engine (1938) Ltd, Newcastle upon Tyne.

== History ==
Empire Daughter was built for the MoWT. She was launched on 27 December 1943 and completed in April 1944. The United Kingdom Official Number 169105 and Code Letters GCSQ were allocated. Her port of registry was Grangemouth. She was placed under the management of Stephenson, Clarke and Associated Companies Ltd.

Empire Daughter was a member of a number of convoys during World War II. She was a member of Convoy FS 1584, which departed from Methil, Fife on 23 September 1944 and arrived at Southend, Essex on 25 September. She was also a member of Convoy TAM 124, which departed from Southend on 31 March 1945 and arrived at Antwerp, Belgium on 1 April; Convoy ATM 135, which departed from Antwerp on 25 April and arrived at Southend on 26 April; and Convoy TAM 171, which departed from Southend on 17 May and arrived at Antwerp that day.

In 1946, Empire Daughter was sold to Harries Brothers & Co Ltd, Swansea, Glamorgan and was renamed Glanrhyd. In 1948, Glanrhyd was sold to Tavistock Shipping Co Ltd, London and renamed Noeldale. In 1949, Noeldale was sold to Henry & Mc Gregor Ltd, Leith, Scotland and renamed Kinnaird Head. In 1961, Kinnaird Head was sold to Gino Gardella, Italy and was renamed Brick Quinto. She served until 1976, when she was scrapped at Savona, Italy.
