= MV Kollbjørg (1941) =

1941 tanker ship

History
- Name: Empire Diamond (1941–42); Norsol (1942–46); Kollbjørg (1946–56); Storo (1956–59)
- Owner: Ministry of War Transport (1941–42); Norwegian Government (1942–46); A/S Kollbjørg (1946–56); Rederi Norland (1956–59); Skjelbreds Rederi A/S (1959)
- Operator: Unknown manager (1941–42); Nortraship (1942–46); O Berg (1946–56); Odmark & Andersson (1956–59); Skjelbreds Rederi A/S (1959)
- Port of registry: United Kingdom (1941–42); Oslo, Norway (1942–56); Sweden (1956–59); (Norway) Kristiansand (1959)
- Builder: Harland & Wolff
- Launched: 10 July 1941
- Completed: November 1941
- Identification: United Kingdom Official Number 168507; Code Letters LNAB (1942–46); Code Letters LLMP (1946–56)
- Fate: Scrapped

General characteristics
- Class & type: Tanker
- Tonnage: 8,236 GRT; 4,708 NRT; 11,970 DWT
- Length: 483 ft 0 in (147.22 m) overall, 465 ft 6 in (141.88 m) between perpendiculars
- Beam: 59 ft 5 in (18.11 m)
- Draught: 34 ft 0 in (10.36 m)
- Depth: 27 ft 6 in (8.38 m)
- Installed power: 3,500 ihp (2,600 kW)
- Propulsion: Diesel engine
- Speed: 12 knots (22 km/h)

Kollbjørg was a 8,236 GRT tanker that was built in 1941 as Empire Diamond by Harland & Wolff, Belfast, United Kingdom for the Ministry of War Transport (MoWT). She was transferred to the Norwegian Government in 1942 and renamed Norsol. In 1946, she was sold into merchant service and renamed Kollbjørg. A sale to Sweden in 1956 saw her renamed Storo, she served until 1959 when she was scrapped.

== Description ==
The ship was built in 1941 by Harland & Wolff, Belfast. She was yard number 940.

The ship was 483 feet 0 inches (147.22 m) long overall (456 feet 6 inches (139.14 m) between perpendiculars), with a beam of 59 feet 5 inches (18.11 m). She had a depth of 27 feet 6 inches (8.38 m) and a draught of 34 feet 0 inches (10.36 m). She was assessed at 8,236 GRT. 4,708 NRT. Her DWT was 11,970.

The ship was propelled by a 3,500 nhp diesel engine, which had 8 cylinders of 650 millimetres (26 in) diameter by 1,400 millimetres (55 in) stroke driving a single screw propeller. The engine was built by Harland and Wolff. It could propel her at 12 knots (22 km/h).

== History ==
Empire Diamond was built for the MoWT. Launched on 10 July 1941, she was completed in November. The Official Number 168507 was allocated.

=== World War II ===
Empire Diamond departed from the Belfast Lough on her maiden voyage on 14 November 1941. She was in ballast, and joined Convoy ON 36, which had departed from Liverpool, Lancashire on 13 November and dispersed at sea on 26 November. Her destination was Halifax, Nova Scotia, Canada, which was reached on 29 November. Having loaded a cargo of petrol, she departed from Halifax on 3 December as a member of Convoy HX 163, which arrived at Liverpool on 19 December. She left the convoy and sailed to the Clyde, arriving that day.

Empire Diamond departed from the Clyde on 31 December, joining Convoy ON 52, which departed from Liverpool that day and dispersed at sea on 11 January 1942. She then sailed to Galveston, Texas, United States, arriving on 27 January. Empire Diamond departed from Galveston on 6 February for Houston, Texas, arriving the next day and departing on 9 February for Halifax, where she arrived on 21 February. Carrying a cargo of petrol, she joined Convoy HX 177, which departed on 25 February and arrived at Liverpool on 9 March. She left the convoy at the Belfast Lough, joining Convoy BB 147 which arrived at Milford Haven, Pembrokeshire on 10 March. She sailed on to Avonmouth, Somerset, arriving on 12 March.

Empire Diamond departed from Avonmouth on 18 March for Newport, Monmouthshire, arriving later that day. On 30 March, she was transferred to the Norwegian Government, and renamed Norsol. She was placed under the management of Nortraship. Her port of registry was Oslo and the Code Letters LNAB were allocated. Norsol sailed the next day for Milford Haven, arriving on 1 April. She departed on 3 April to join Convoy ON 83, which departed from Liverpool on 4 April and arrived at Halifax on 17 April. Her intended destination was Port Arthur, Texas, but she returned, arriving at the Belfast Lough on 4 April. She departed for Port Arthur on 16 April, joining Convoy ON 87, which departed from Liverpool that day and dispersed at 36°03′N 46°15′W on 26 April. Norsol then sailed to Beaumont, Texas, United States, where she arrived on 6 May. She sailed a week later for Key West, Florida. On 14 May, Norsol rescued two survivors from David McKelvy, which had been torpedoed and set on fire by U-506 the previous day. They were taken to Key West. She arrived on 17 May and sailed four days later. Norsol may have been a member of Convoy KN 102, which arrived at the Hampton Roads, Virginia on 26 May. She arrived at New York the next day and then sailed to Boston, Massachusetts, She then joined Convoy BX 21, which departed on 29 May and arrived at Halifax two days later. She sailed that day for Belfast Lough, joining Convoy HX 192, which arrived at Liverpool on 11 June. She was carrying a cargo of petrol. Arrival at Belfast Lough was on 10 June, with departure the next day for Swansea, Glamorgan, as a member of Convoy BB 185, which arrived at Milford Haven the next day, Swansea was reached that day.

Norsol departed from Swansea on 17 June bound for New York. via Milford Haven, from where she departed on 18 June to join Convoy ON 105, which departed from Liverpool on 19 June and arrived at Halifax on 30 June. She arrived at Belfast Lough on 19 June, departing on 18 July to join Convoy ON 113 which departed from Liverpool the previous day and arrived at Halifax on 31 July. Norsol sailed on to New York, arriving on 2 August. She departed six days later for the Hampton Roads, from where she departed on 13 August with Convoy KS 530, which arrived at Key West on 18 August. She detached from the convoy and sailed to New Orleans, Louisiana, arriving on 21 August. She then sailed to Pilottown, Corpus Christi, Texas, Galveston, Texas, and back to Pilottown, from where she departed on 30 August for Key West, arriving on 3 September. She then sailed to New York, from where she departed on 17 September as a member of Convoy HX 208, which arrived at Liverpool on 2 October. Norsol was commended by the Convoy Commodore for her good signalling and station keeping. She then sailed to Swansea, joining either Convoy BB 225 or BB 226 as far as Milford Haven.

Norsol departed from Swansea on 7 October and sailed to Milford Haven and then to Belfast Lough, from where she joined Convoy ON 137, which departed from Liverpool on 9 October and arrived at New York on 29 October. She then joined Convoy NG 318, which departed from New York on 31 October and arrived at Guantanamo Bay, Cuba on 7 November. She departed that day as a member of Convoy GAT 20, which arrived at Trinidad on 12 November. She left the convoy at Curaçao, Territory of Curaçao, arriving on 10 November. Norsol departed from Curaçao six days later to join Convoy TAG 21, which had departed from Trinidad on 14 November and arrived at Guantanamo Bay on 19 November. She departed that day as a member of Convoy GN 21, which arrived at New York on 25 November. She joined Convoy HX 217, which departed on 27 November and arrived at Liverpool on 14 December. She was carrying a cargo of aviation fuel, which was delivered to the Stanlow Refinery, Ellesmere Port, Cheshire.

Norsol was a member of Convoy ON 155, which departed from Liverpool on 19 December and arrived at New York on 6 January 1943. She detached from the convoy at 43°33′N 58°30′W on 1 January and sailed to Guantanamo Bay, arriving on 8 January. She departed two days later as a member of Convoy GAT 36, which arrived at Trinidad on 16 January. She left the convoy at Curaçao, arriving on 15 January and sailing two days later to join Convoy GAT 37, which had departed from Guantanamo Bay on 14 January and arrived at Trinidad on 20 January. She departed from Trinidad on 23 January as a member of Convoy TB 3, which arrived at Bahia, Brazil on 9 February. She detached from the convoy on 26 January and sailed to Takoradi, Gold Coast, arriving on 7 February. Norsol departed four days later for Lagos, Nigeria, arriving on 12 February. She sailed for Accra, Gold Coast on 15 February, arriving the next day. Five days later, she sailed for Takoradi, arriving on 22 February and departing four days later for Trinidad, which was reached on 12 March. She departed form Trinidad on 15 March as a member of Convoy TAG 48, which arrived at Guantanamo Bay on 20 March. She left the convoy at Curaçao, arriving on 17 March and departing five days later to join Convoy TAG 49, which had departed from Trinidad on 20 March and arrived at Guantanamo Bay on 24 March. Norsol then joined Convoy GN49, which sailed that day and arrived at New York on 31 March. She was a member of Convoy HX 233, which departed from New York on 6 April and arrived at Liverpool on 21 April. She was carrying a cargo of Avgas, which was delivered to the Stanlow Refinery before she continued to Manchester, Lancashire.

Norsol departed from Liverpool on 6 April as a member of Convoy ON180, which arrived at New York on 14 May. Carrying a cargo of avgas, she departed from New York on 31 May as a member of Convoy HX 242, which arrived at Liverpool on 15 June. She left the convoy at Belfast Lough, joining Convoy BB 300, which departed on 15 June and arrived at Milford Haven the next day. She then sailed to Avonmouth, arriving later that day.

Norsol departed from Avonmouth on 21 June for Milford Haven. She sailed from Milford Haven on 23 June to join Convoy ON 190, which departed from Liverpool on 23 June and arrived at New York on 9 July. On 2 July, she was involved in a collision with the Liberty ship Joseph Leidy. She departed from New York on 27 August as a member of Convoy HX 254, which arrived at Liverpool on 12 September. She arrived at the Clyde on 10 September and then sailed to Bowling, West Dunbartonshire, arriving on 12 September.

Norsol departed from Bowling on 13 September and sailed to Ardrossan, Ayrshire and then to the Clyde, from where she departed on 15 September to join Convoy ON 202, which departed from Liverpool that day and arrived at New York on 1 October. She left the convoy at the Delaware Capes that day and sailed to Philadelphia, Pennsylvania. She departed from Philadelphia on 4 October and sailed to New York, arriving the next day. Carrying a cargo of avgas and petrol, she departed from New York on 11 October as a member of Convoy HX 261, which arrived at Liverpool on 26 October.

Norsol was a member of Convoy ON 209, which departed from Liverpool on 31 October and arrived at New York on 17 November. She departed four days later for the Hampton Roads, from where she joined Convoy UGS 25, which departed on 24 November and arrived at Port Said, Egypt on 21 December. She left the convoy at Augusta, Sicily, Italy, arriving on 17 December. She departed on 22 December as a member of Convoy AH 14, which arrived at Bari on 24 December. She left the convoy at Taranto that day.

Norsol departed from Taranto on 5 January 1944 to join Convoy HA 16, which departed from Bari that day and arrived at Augusta on 7 January. She then joined Convoy GUS 27, which had departed from Port Said on 5 January and arrived at the Hampton Roads on 4 February. She then sailed to New York, arriving that day. Norsol departed from New York on 10 February for the Hampton Roads, from where she joined Convoy UGS 33, which departed on 13 February and arrived at Port Said on 12 March. She left the conoy at Augusta, arriving on 8 March and departing four days later as a member of Convoy AH 30, which arrived at Brindisi on 14 March. She left convoy at Bari that day. On 20 March, Norsol sailed to Brindisi, from where she departed under escort two days later for Augusta, arriving on 23 March. On 25 March, she joined Convoy MKS 44, which had departed from Port Said on 20 March and arrived at Gibraltar on 1 April. She left the convoy at Algiers, Algeria, arriving on 29 March. She departed from Algiers on 4 April, joining Convoy GUS 35, which had departed from Port Said on 25 March and arrived at the Hampton Roads on 22 April. She sailed to New York, arriving that day.

Norsol departed from New York on 27 April for Philadelphia, arriving the next day and departing on 30 April for the Hampton Roads. She then join Convoy UGS 41, which departed on 3 May and ar0irved at Port Said on 30 May. She left the convoy at Algiers, arriving on 22 May. She departed on 2 June, joining Convoy GUS 41, which had departed from Port Said on 24 May and arrived at the Hampton Roads on 19 June. She reached her destination of New York later that day. Norsol departed from New York on 22 June for the Hampton Roads, arriving the next day. She then joined Convoy UGS 46, which departed on 24 June and arrived at Port Said on 20 July. She left the convoy at Praia Bay, Azores, Portugal on 6 July, departing two days later to join Convoy GUS 44, which had departed from Port Said on 24 June and arrived at the Hampton Roads on 18 July. She then sailed to Philadelphia, arriving that day.

Norsol departed from Philadelphia on 20 July for the Hampton Roads, arriving the next day. She then joined Convoy UGS 49, which sailed on 24 July and arrived at Port Said on 19 August. She left the convoy at Casablanca, Morocco, On 9 August. She sailed the next day, joining Convoy GUS 48, which had departed from Port Said on 3 August and arrived at the Hampton Roads on 28 August. She then sailed to Philadelphia, from where she departed on 30 August for the Hampton Roads, arriving the next day. Norsol was a member of Convoy UGS 53, which departed on 2 September and arrived at Port Said on 28 September. She left the convoy at Algiers, arriving on 20 September and departing five days later to join Convoy MKS 62, which had departed from Port Said on 16 September and arrived at Gibraltar on 27 September. She left the convoy at Oran, Algeria the next day. Norsol departed from Oran on 1 October, joining Convoy GUS 53, which had departed from Port Said on 22 September and arrived at the Hampton Roads on 17 October. She then sailed to New York.

Norsol departed from New York on 21 October, joining Convoy UGS 58, which departed from the Hampton Roads the next day and arrived at Port Said on 22 November. She called at Oran and arrived at Augusta on 14 November, joining Convoy AH 79, which departed that day and arrived at Bari two days later. She departed from Bari on 19 November for Malta, arriving on 23 November and sailing that day to join Convoy UGS 59, which had departed from the Hampton Roads on 1 November and arrived at Port Said on 27 November. She then sailed to Haifa, Palestine, arriving the next day. Norsol departed from Haifa on 2 December and sailed to Oran via Augusta and Bari, arriving on 21 December. She joined Convoy GUS 62, which departed on 23 December and arrived at the Hampton Roads on 10 January 1945, from where she sailed to New York, arriving that day. She was a member of Convoy HX 334, which departed from New York on 23 January and arrived at Liverpool on 6 February. She was carrying a cargo of avgas, which was delivered to the Stanlow Refinery, Ellesmere Port.

Having discharged her cargo, Norsol anchored in the Mersey on 9 February, awaiting the departure of Convoy ON 284 from Liverpool, which occurred on 11 February. The convoy arrived at New York on 1 March. Laden with avgas, she departed from New York on 4 March as a member of Convoy HX 342, which arrived at Liverpool on 19 March. She departed four days later to join Convoy ON 292, which had departed from Southend, Essex on 22 March and arrived at New York on 8 April. She arrived at the Hampton Roads on 9 April, departing on 14 April as a member of Convoy UGS 86, which arrived at Gibraltar on 28 April. Norsol continued past Gibraltar and sailed to Bari via Augusta, arriving on 4 May.

=== Post-war ===
Norsol departed from Augusta on 10 May for Oran, arriving four days later. She was a member of Convoy GUS 90, which departed from Oran on 17 May and arrived at the Hampton Roads on 2 June. She left the convoy at the Delaware Capes. She sailed three days later for Gibraltar and the Mediterranean, but returned to the Delaware Capes, sailing again on 9 June. Passing Gibraltar on 21 June, she arrived at Naples, Italy on 25 June, she sailed the next day for Livorno and Vado Ligure, from where she departed on 1 July for Oran. Norsol sailed two days later for New York, arriving on 15 July and departing five days later for Philadelphia, arriving on 21 July. She sailed on 26 July for Southend, where she arrived on 8 August, before continuing to London.

Norsol departed from Thames Haven, Essex on 9 September for Port Said, arriving on 20 September and then proceeding to Suez, Egypt that day. She departed from Suez and sailed to Abadan, Iran, arriving on 1 October and sailing two days later for Aden, where she arrived on 10 October. Norsol departed from Aden on 13 October for Abadan, via Massowah, Eritrea and Port Sudan, Sudan, arriving on 26 October and departing two days later for Melbourne, Australia, where she arrived on 23 November.

Norsol departed from Melbourne on 25 November for Sydney, arriving two days later. She departed on 1 December for Abadan, where she arrived on 25 December, departing three days later for Suez, arriving on 8 January 1946. She departed that day for Liverpool via Port Said, passing Gibraltar on 16 January and arriving at Liverpool on 22 January. Norsol departed from Liverpool on 15 February for Abadan, via Port Said and Suez, arriving on 10 March. She sailed three days later for Suez, Port Said and Southampton, Hampshire, from where she departed on 8 April for Baton Rouge, Louisiana, United States via New Orleans. Norsol sailed from Baton Rouge on 27 April for Rotterdam, Netherlands.

In 1946, Norsol was sold to A/S Kollbjørg and renamed Kollbjørg. She was operated under the management of Odd Berg, Oslo. The Code Letters LLMP were allocated. In 1956, Kollbjørg was sold to Rederi Norland, Sweden and renamed Storo. She was operated under the management of Odmark & Andersson. In 1959, Storo was sold to Skjelbreds Rederi A/S, Kristiansand, Norway, who sold her to shipbreakers O Kees & Co, Hong Kong. She arrived at Hong Kong on 20 November 1959 for scrapping.
