= HMS Goathland =

British naval ship

History

United Kingdom
- Name: HMS Goathland
- Ordered: 23 August 1940
- Builder: Fairfield, Govan
- Laid down: 30 January 1941
- Launched: 3 February 1942
- Commissioned: 6 November 1942
- Identification: Pennant number: L27
- Fate: Mined 24 July 1944; Constructive Total Loss; Scrapped February 1946

General characteristics
- Class & type: Type III Hunt-class destroyer
- Displacement: 1,050 long tons (1,067 t) standard, 1,490 long tons (1,514 t) full load
- Length: 264 ft 3 in (80.54 m) pp, 280 ft (85.34 m) oa
- Beam: 31 ft 6 in (9.60 m)
- Draught: 7 ft 9 in (2.36 m)
- Propulsion: 2 Admiralty 3-drum boilers; 2 shaft Parsons geared turbines, 19,000 shp (14,000 kW)
- Speed: 27 kn (50 km/h; 31 mph)
- Range: 3,700 nmi (6,900 km; 4,300 mi) at 14 kn (26 km/h; 16 mph)
- Complement: 168
- Armament: 4 × QF 4 in Mark XVI guns on twin mounts Mk. XIX; 4 × QF 2 pdr Mk. VIII (1 × quad mount); 3 × 20 mm Oerlikons; 2 × 21 in (533 mm) torpedo tubes; 70 depth charges, 4 throwers, 2 racks

HMS Goathland was a Type III Hunt-class destroyer of the British Royal Navy that took part in the Second World War. The destroyer was built by Fairfield at their Govan, Scotland shipyard in 1941 to 1942, completing in November 1942.

Goathland was deployed in the English Channel on operations against German shipping and anti-E-boat patrols, and between September 1943 and January 1944 was converted to a headquarters ship for amphibious operations. Goathland took part in the Normandy Landings on 6 June 1944, and was mined off the Normandy beaches on 24 July 1944. While Goathland remained afloat, the ship was declared a constructive total loss and not repaired. She was scrapped in February 1946.

== Construction and design ==
The Hunt class was meant to fill the Royal Navy's need for a large number of small destroyer-type vessels capable of both convoy escort and operations with the fleet. The Type III Hunts differed from the previous Type II ships in replacing a twin 4-inch gun mount by two torpedo tubes to improve their ability to operate as destroyers. The Type III Hunts were 264 feet 3 inches (80.54 m) long between perpendiculars and 280 feet (85.34 m) overall, with a beam was 31 feet 6 inches (9.60 m) and draught 7 feet 9 inches (2.36 m). Displacement was 1,050 long tons (1,067 t) standard and 1,490 long tons (1,514 t) under full load. Two Admiralty boilers raising steam at 300 pounds per square inch (2,100 kPa) and 620 °F (327 °C) fed Parsons single-reduction geared steam turbines that drove two propeller shafts, generating 19,000 shaft horsepower (14,000 kW) at 380 rpm. This gave a design maximum speed of 27 knots (50 km/h; 31 mph). 345 long tons (351 t) of oil fuel were carried, giving a range of 3,700 nautical miles (6,900 km; 4,300 mi) at 15 knots (28 km/h; 17 mph). Type III Hunts had a complement of 168 officers and other ranks, but after conversion to an assault group headquarters ship, this increased to 284, including RAF and army personnel.

Main gun armament was four 4 inch (102 mm) QF Mk XVI dual purpose (anti-ship and anti-aircraft) guns in two twin mounts, with a quadruple 2-pounder "pom-pom" and three Oerlikon 20 mm cannon providing close-in anti-aircraft fire. Two 21-inch (533 mm) torpedo tubes were fitted in a single twin mount, while two depth charge chutes, four depth charge throwers and 70 depth charges comprised the ship's anti-submarine armament. During conversion to an assault group headquarters ship, an additional 2-pounder was mounted in the ship's bow to protect against enemy motor torpedo boats, and the Oerlikon mounts were replaced by three twin mounts. Type 291 and Type 285 radar was fitted, as was Type 128 sonar.

Goathland was one of 15 Type III Hunts ordered on 23 August 1940 as part of the 1940 War Emergency Programme in the last order placed for Hunt-class destroyers. She was laid down at Fairfield's Govan, Glasgow shipyard on 30 January 1941, as yard number 694. The destroyer was damaged in a German air raid on 13 March 1941, delaying construction. Goathland was launched on 3 February 1942 and was completed on 6 November that year. Goathland was named after a Yorkshire fox hunt, and was the first ship of that name to serve with the Royal Navy. She was allocated the Pennant number L27.

== Service ==
After commissioning and workup, Goathland joined the 15th Destroyer Flotilla based at Plymouth. In January–February 1943, Goathland took part in attempts to intercept the German auxiliary cruiser Togo. These operations culminated when Togo and accompanying escorts was spotted off Gravelines on the evening of 10 February, and Goathland was one of five destroyers patrolling off Beachy Head (Note: Goathland, Bleasdale, Cleveland, Eskdale and Glaisdale.) that were ordered to intercept the German force, but Togo was attacked and damaged by Allied aircraft, and put into Boulogne, causing the attack by Goathland's group of destroyers to be called off. Other duties included searches for crews of missing aircraft, and patrols against German E-boats.

Crew of Goathland after the action of 28 April 1943

On the night of 27/28 April 1943, Goathland and the destroyer Albrighton were ordered to intercept a German convoy of two merchant ships escorted by two subchasers and a patrol vessel off the coast of Brittany. They found the convoy in the Bay of Morlaix early on 28 April, and despite bright moonlight, managed to catch the convoy by surprise when they launched attack, with Goathland hitting the Italian steamer Butterfly with two torpedoes. The two destroyers became separated, and while Goathland received minor damage from shell splinters, Albrighton had her steering gear knocked out and was temporarily immobilised before the steering gear was repaired and the ship broke off the engagement. Butterfly and the German subchaser UJ1402 were sunk by the British ships.

On the night of 28/29 May 1943, Goathland was one of four destroyers (Note: Goathland, Garth, Wensleydale and the Polish-manned Krakowiak.) that were carrying out an anti-E-boat sweep when they, together with several Motor Gun Boats (MGBs) and Motor Launches (MLs), clashed with German E-boats west of Portland. Wenslydale, two of the MGBs and one ML sustained minor damage. On the night of 2/3 September 1943, Goathland and the destroyer Limbourne engaged German E-Boats near Guernsey, with Limbourne claiming one E-Boat possibly sunk and another damaged.

On 23 September 1943, Goathland commenced modification at Liverpool into an Assault Group Headquarters Ship. These were intended to support the upcoming invasion of France, by providing communications for a brigade until the army unit could set up a headquarters ashore. As such the ship needed to accommodate additional staff for the headquarters role and additional communications equipment. Modification work continued to January 1944. Goathland then worked up in her new role, taking part in several exercises in the months leading up to the invasion. On 6 June 1944, Goathland took part in the Normandy landings, operating off Sword Beach and controlling the landing of the 8th Infantry Brigade. After the initial landings were complete, Goathland became the headquarters ship for Captain, Northbound Sailings, who was responsible for the organisation of convoys from the invasion beaches back to British ports, combining this daytime duty with night-time patrols off the beachhead.

On 24 July 1944, Goathland was on patrol off the Normandy beaches when a ground mine exploded under the ship. The ship's aft magazine and fuel tank flooded, causing her to heel over to starboard, and there was extensive shock damage to the ship's machinery and bending of the propeller shafts, immobilising the ship. Goathland was towed back to Portsmouth and when the damage to the ship was surveyed, it was concluded that the ship was beyond economic repair, and Goathland was paid off as a constructive total loss. The ship was laid up at Inveraray from October 1944, and at the Gareloch from February 1945. She was scrapped by the West of Scotland Shipbreaking Company at Troon in February 1946.
