= Greek destroyer Adrias (L67) =

Greek naval vessel (1942–1945)

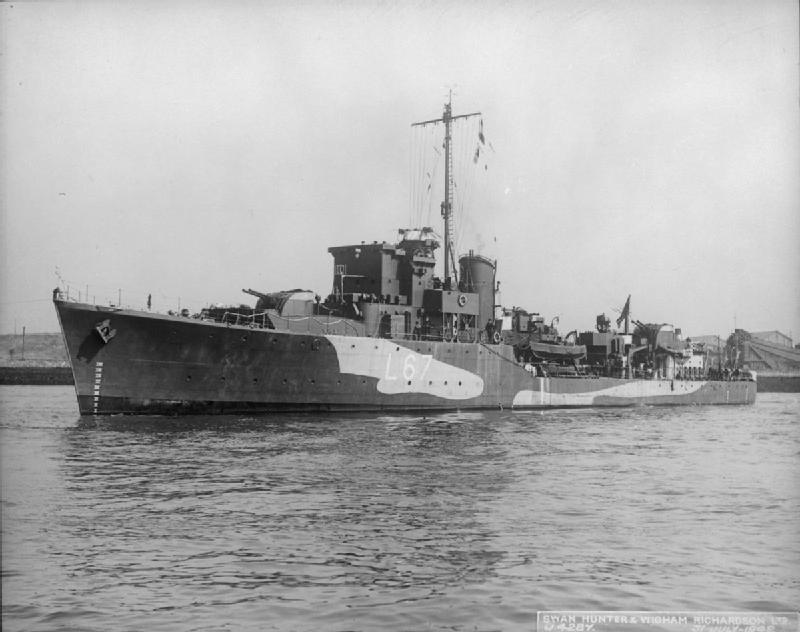
- Adrias on the River Tyne, 31 July 1942. Shortly after she was taken over by the Hellenic Navy

History

United Kingdom
- Name: Border
- Namesake: Border Hunt
- Builder: Swan Hunter, Tyne and Wear, United Kingdom
- Laid down: 1 May 1941
- Launched: 3 February 1942

Greece
- Name: Adrias - ΒΠ Αδρίας
- Namesake: Adria/Adriatic Sea
- Acquired: 20 July 1942
- Commissioned: 5 August 1942
- Decommissioned: 1945
- Identification: Pennant number: L67
- Fate: Returned to UK and sold for scrap

General characteristics
- Class & type: Type III Hunt-class destroyer
- Displacement: Full load 1,490 tons; Standard 1,050 tons
- Length: 85.3 m (280 ft)
- Beam: 11.4 m (37 ft)
- Draft: 2.4 m (7 ft 10 in)
- Propulsion: Boilers: 2 Admiralty three-drum boilers, Engines: 2 shaft Parsons turbine, Shafts: 2 (twin screw ship), Power: 19,000 shp, (14.2 MW)
- Speed: 26-knot (48 km/h) maximum; 20-knot (37 km/h) maximum operational
- Range: 2,350 nautical miles (4,350 km) at 20.0 knots (37 km/h)
- Complement: 170
- Armament: 4 × 4-inch (102 mm) (2 × 2) guns, one 4 × 40 mm A/A QF 2-pounder pompom gun, 3 × 20 mm A/A, 2 × 21-inch (533 mm) T/T, one depth charge track

Adrias (Greek: ΒΠ Αδρίας) was a Type III Hunt-class destroyer that was originally built for the Royal Navy as HMS Border but never commissioned. Before her completion, she was loaned to the Royal Hellenic Navy on 20 July 1942 and commissioned as Adrias on 5 August 1942 in order to relieve heavy losses of ships sustained by the Royal Hellenic Navy during the German invasion of 1941 and throughout the war. Adrias took her name from the ancient Greek town of Adria in Italy, at the mouth of the Po river, after which the Adriatic Sea is named (Herodotus vi. 127, vii. 20, ix. 92; Euripides, Hippolytus, 736).

Command of Adrias was accepted by Cmdr. Ioannis Toumbas in Newcastle, England, on 20 July 1942. Upon completion of the training period on 26 August, while sailing under foggy conditions with only the left engine functioning, she ran aground near Scapa Flow. The damage took four months to repair. No responsibility was attributed to the captain for the accident. In the beginning of January, 1943, after the completion of repairs, Adrias sailed to the Mediterranean where she participated in missions escorting convoys.

== Service ==
On 27 January 1943, while positioned 360 nautical miles (667 km) NW off Cape Finisterre Adrias was believed to have sunk the German submarine U-553 (British Admiralty's signal presumed her possibly sunk). When the war ended the loss of the German submarine was officially confirmed to have occurred on 27 January. However, the name of the ship that caused the sinking was not mentioned. During that same operation on 13 February 1943, Adrias sunk or seriously damaged U-623 (the last report from that submarine was dated 9 February 1943).

Adrias took part in numerous convoy escorts in the Mediterranean as well as in the Sicily landing operations, where on the night of 20 July 1943, in cooperation with British escort destroyer HMS Quantock she successfully confronted 3 German torpedo boats during a night engagement and sunk two of them. On 20 September 1943 Adrias represented Greece when a force of four Allied ships accepted the surrender of a contingent of the Italian Royal Navy (out of Taranto) that was sailing towards Malta following the armistice with Italy.

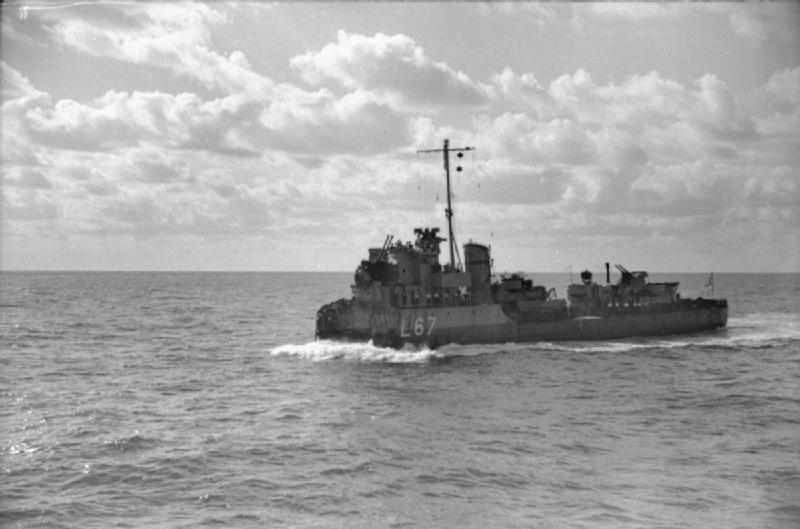
Adrias on her way to Alexandria

On 22 October 1943, during operations in the Dodecanese, while near the island of Kalymnos with the British destroyer HMS Hurworth, Adrias struck a mine. The explosion tore her bow off. The English Flotilla Commander onboard Hurworth ordered Cmdr. Toumbas to abandon ship. Hurworth, while trying to come to Adrias's rescue, also hit a mine and sunk taking 133 men with her. In spite of the damage suffered, Adrias took on the survivors of Hurworth (among them her CO) and managed to reach the nearby coast of Gümüşlük in neutral Turkey with 21 men of her crew dead and 30 wounded. After some minor repairs, the ship sailed on 1 December for Alexandria, despite her missing bow. After a trip of 730 nautical miles (1,350 km), of which 300 were within the range of Luftwaffe's Junkers Ju 88 bombers based in occupied Greece, (the threat of them forced her to sail only at night despite her limited maneuverability), she managed to reach Alexandria on 6 December (day of the Feast of St. Nicholas, patron saint of seamen) where she was enthusiastically greeted by the British Fleet and other Allied ships. This achievement was considered a brilliant example of seamanship, and provided a morale boost to the Royal Hellenic Navy and other allied ships in the Mediterranean.

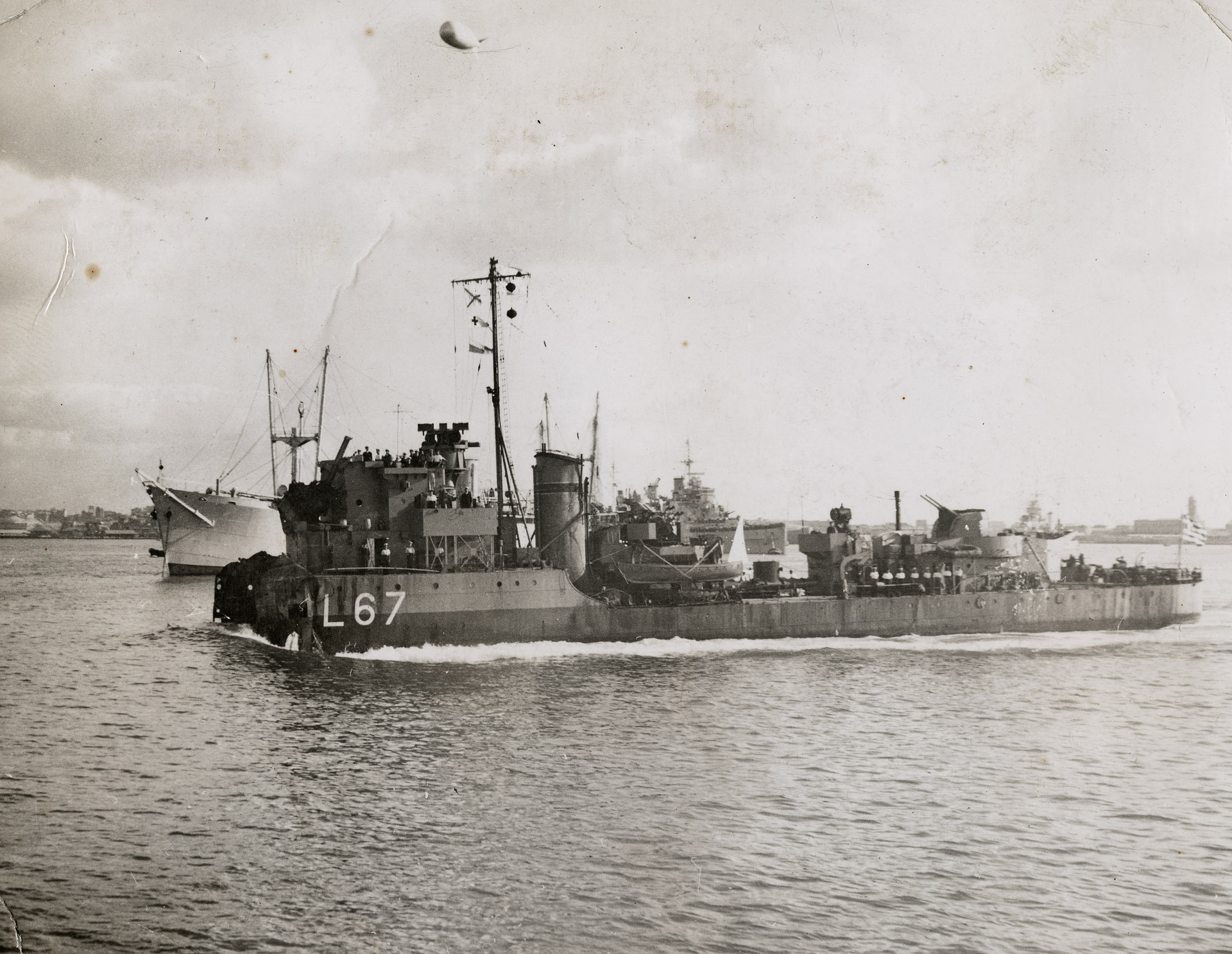
Adrias at Alexandria harbour, 6 December 1943

After the liberation of Greece from the Germans, Adrias, with her bow temporarily repaired, arrived in Faliro with the rest of the ships of the Hellenic Fleet. The ship was never fully repaired due to the termination of war operations in the Mediterranean and sailed to England where she was returned to the Royal Navy. Adrias was scrapped shortly thereafter. Of the same class of ships serving in the Hellenic Navy were: Adrias (D06) formerly HMS Tanatside (loaned to Hellenic Navy as a replacement of this ship), Hastings formerly HMS Catterick loaned to Hellenic Navy in 1946, Kanaris built as HMS Hatherleigh, Miaoulis built as HMS Modbury, Pindos built as HMS Bolebroke.

The Hellenic Navy gave the same name to commemorate this ship to Standard type frigate Adrias (F-459) in 1994.

== Publications ==
- Colledge, J. J.; Warlow, Ben (2006) [1969]. Ships of the Royal Navy: The Complete Record of All Fighting Ships of the Royal Navy from the 15th Century to the Present (3rd Rev ed.). London: Chatham Publishing. ISBN 978-1-86176-281-8. OCLC 67375475.
- English, John (1987). The Hunts: A History of the Design, Development and Careers of the 86 Destroyers of This Class Built for the Royal and Allied Navies During World War II. Cumbria, UK: World Ship Society. ISBN 0-905617-44-4.
