= HDMS Rolf Krake =

HDMS Rolf Krake is the name of the following ships of the Royal Danish Navy, named for Rolf Krake:

- HDMS Rolf Krake (1863), an ironclad scrapped in 1907
- HDMS Rolf Krake (F342), a Hunt-class destroyer acquired from the Royal Navy in 1952, scrapped in 1966
