= HMS Garth =

Two ships of the Royal Navy have borne the name HMS Garth.

- HMS Garth (1917) was a Hunt-class minesweeper launched in 1917 and sold in 1923.
- HMS Garth (L20) was a Hunt-class destroyer launched in 1940 and scrapped in 1958.
