= HMS Lamerton =

Type II Hunt-class destroyer of the Royal Navy, later the Indian Navy

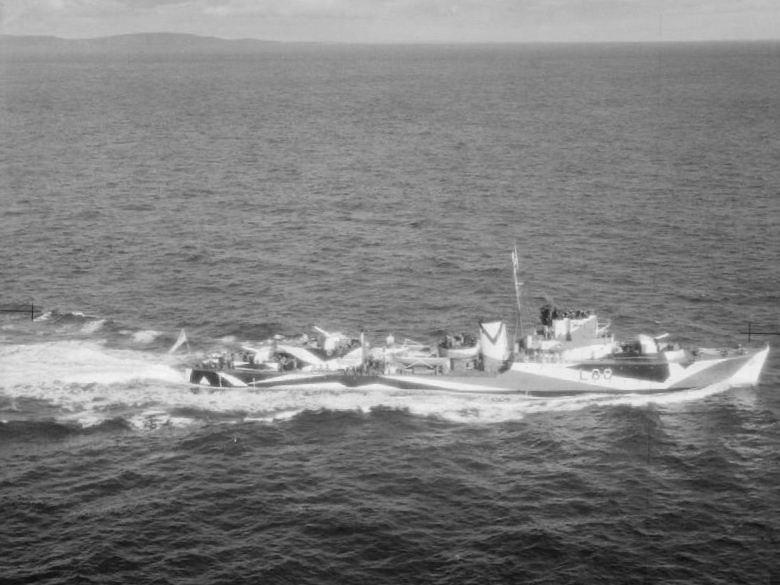
- Aerial photograph of HMS Lamerton in September 1941

History

United Kingdom
- Name: HMS Lamerton
- Ordered: 3 September 1939
- Builder: Swan Hunter
- Laid down: 10 April 1940
- Launched: 14 December 1940
- Commissioned: 16 August 1941
- Identification: Pennant number: L88
- Honours and awards: Atlantic, 1941–42; Arctic, 1942; North Africa, 1942–43; Sicily, 1943; Salerno, 1943; Mediterranean, 1944; Aegean, 1943; Adriatic, 1944
- Fate: Loaned, then sold, to Indian Navy

India
- Name: INS Gomati
- Namesake: Gomti River
- Acquired: April 1958
- Commissioned: 24 April 1953
- Decommissioned: 1975
- Identification: Pennant number: D93
- Fate: Scrapped

General characteristics
- Class & type: Type II Hunt-class destroyer
- Displacement: 1,050 long tons (1,070 t) standard; 1,430 long tons (1,450 t) full load
- Length: 85.3 m (279 ft 10 in) o/a
- Beam: 9.6 m (31 ft 6 in)
- Draught: 2.51 m (8 ft 3 in)
- Propulsion: 2 Admiralty 3-drum boilers; 2 shaft Parsons geared turbines, 19,000 shp
- Speed: 27 knots (31 mph; 50 km/h); 25.5 kn (29.3 mph; 47.2 km/h) full
- Range: 3,700 nmi (6,900 km) at 14 kn (26 km/h)
- Complement: 164
- Armament: 6 × QF 4 in Mark XVI guns on twin mounts Mk. XIX; 4 × QF 2 pdr Mk. VIII on quad mount MK.VII; 2 (later 4) × 20 mm Oerlikons on single mounts P Mk. III; 110 depth charges, 2 throwers, 3 racks

HMS Lamerton was a Type II Hunt-class destroyer of the Royal Navy. She was sold to the Indian Navy in 1952, where she served as INS Gomati.

Following the war, early in 1946, she was reduced to Reserve status at Harwich.

== Royal Navy ==
Lamerton was ordered on 3 September 1939 under the 1939 War Emergency Build Programme. She was laid down as Job No. J4142. She was commissioned on 16 August 1941.

=== Operation Torch ===
Lamerton was present at the Allied invasion of North Africa, known as Operation Torch, as part of Force H. At 1045 on 6 November 1942, after passing through the Strait of Gibraltar, the screen of Force H was augmented by the arrival of Lamerton, along with Acute, Algerine, Alarm, Albacore, Cadmus, Speedwell, Hussar, ORP Błyskawica, Wilton, and Wheatland, whilst Ibis, Enchantress, Clare, Broke, Malcolm, Wrestler and Vanoc were detached to join convoy KMSA 1.

At 1230 on 6 November, the Spanish fishing vessel Jesus Dei Gran was sighted to the south-east. Vice Admiral Burrough ordered Lamerton to board her and to send her under armed guard to Gibraltar. The crew, according to Burrough, were "very friendly and in no way resented this interruption of their peaceful occupation".

At 2230 on 7 September, Bulolo - the command ship - and the ships of B Sector, consisting of Keren, Winchester Castle, Otranto, Sobieski, Awatea, Strathnaver, Cathay, and escorted by Palomares, Acute, Alarm, Albacore, Lamerton, Wheatland, Wilton, Błyskawica, Hoy, Incholm, Mull, and Motor Launches 444, 238 and 307, were stopped in position 36°52.5'N., 02°49'E. There was a moderate north-easterly breeze, slight sea, clear sky and good visibility. Cape Caxine and all coastal lights were visible.

== Indian Navy ==
Along with Bedale and Chiddingfold, Lamerton was leased to India in 1952, as recompense for the Royal Navy not supplying a cruiser which was originally planned. The three ships became the 22nd Destroyer Squadron, with Bedale (now INS Godavari) as the leader. They would all require refits which were expected to cost approximately £120,000 and take around eight months. The ships were initially loaned to India on seven conditions:

1. India would be responsible for any work required before taking over the ships, including installing any equipment
2. Armament and logistic support would be provided free of charge, but equivalent amounts were to be returned at the end of the loan period
3. The standard of maintenance, and the period between refits, would be the same as when in Royal Navy service
4. All additions and alterations were to be at India's expense, and subject to the approval of the Admiralty
5. When the vessels were returned, they should be returned with stores, and in good condition (allowing for wear and tear)
6. In the event of any loss, compensation would be payable
7. That the loan would be for three years initially, subject to extension by an agreement: but the vessels would be returned if the UK needed them in an emergency - although the Royal Navy had plenty of frigates, NATO had a shortage of them.

The transfer deal was agreed by Clement Attlee on 22 October 1951, and the Indian government were informed on the same day. She was commissioned into the Indian Navy on 24 April 1953, with the commissioning ceremony being performed by Shrimati Saraswati Kher, wife of Shri Kher, the Indian High Commissioner. Unusually, she was still named Lamerton at this time, rather than Gomati, and her commissioning orders were issued by a British Admiral, Sir Maurice Mansergh. At the Spithead Review in 1953, despite being in the Royal Navy, it still flew the White Ensign and carried its original name, along with the two other ships of the Indian 22nd Destroyer Squadron, and the INS Delhi, Tir and Ranjit, which were flying Indian colours. It was not until 18 June 1953 that the ships took their Indian names at a ceremony in Liverpool, with a 'breaking of coconuts' rather than the breaking of bottles of champagne being carried out by the wife of Captain G S Kapoor.

The first commander was Lieutenant Commander Inder Singh, who later rose to the rank of Commodore. The Executive Officer was Lieutenant R N Batra.

The lease was extended in August 1956, and she was sold to India in April 1958.

She was deployed as a training ship until 1975, when she was struck from the active list, before being sold for scrapping.

== Publications ==
- Colledge, J. J.; Warlow, Ben (2006) [1969]. Ships of the Royal Navy: The Complete Record of All Fighting Ships of the Royal Navy from the 15th Century to the Present (3rd Rev ed.). London: Chatham Publishing. ISBN 978-1-86176-281-8. OCLC 67375475.
- The Hunts: a history of the design, development and careers of the 86 destroyers of this class built for the Royal and Allied Navies during World War II, John English, World Ship Society, 1987, ISBN 0-905617-44-4
