= HMS Lauderdale =

Destroyer of the Royal Navy

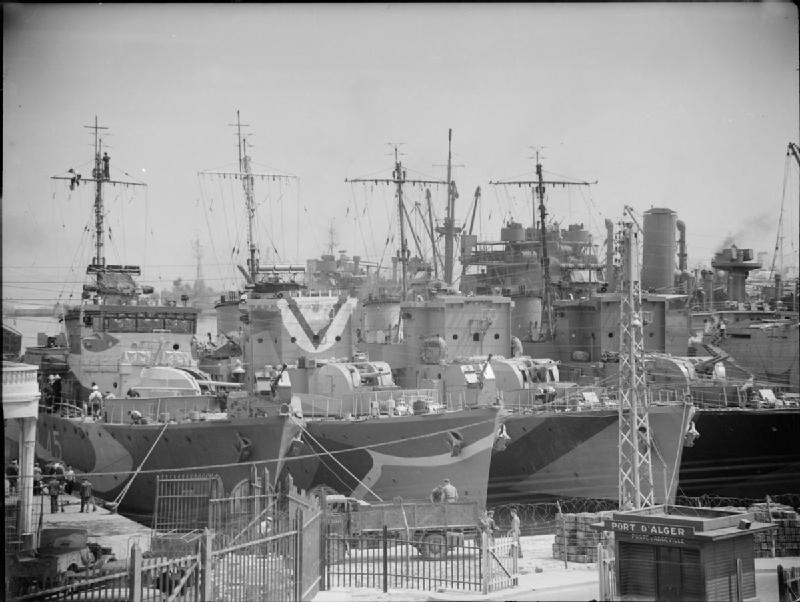
- HMS Lauderdale at Algiers Harbour decorated with a 'V', c. 1943

History

United Kingdom
- Name: HMS Lauderdale
- Ordered: 4 September 1939
- Builder: John Isaac Thornycroft
- Laid down: 12 December 1939
- Launched: 5 August 1941
- Commissioned: August 1942
- Identification: Pennant number: L95
- Honours and awards: Atlantic 1942; North Sea 1942; Sicily 1943; Mediterranean 1943; South France 1944; Adriatic 1944
- Fate: Loaned to the Royal Hellenic Navy in 1946
- Badge: On a Field Red two antlers, suspended from the tines a bugle horn, stringed Gold.

Greece
- Name: Aigaion
- Namesake: Aegean Sea
- Fate: Returned to the Royal Navy December 1959; Scrapped in Greece 1960

General characteristics
- Class & type: Hunt-class destroyer
- Displacement: 1,050 long tons (1,070 t) standard; 1,435 long tons (1,458 t) full load
- Length: 85.3 m (279 ft 10 in) o/a
- Beam: 10.16 m (33 ft 4 in)
- Draught: 3.51 m (11 ft 6 in)
- Propulsion: 2 Admiralty 3-drum boilers; 2 shaft Parsons geared turbines, 19,000 shp
- Speed: 27 knots (31 mph; 50 km/h); 25.5 kn (29.3 mph; 47.2 km/h) full
- Range: 2,350 nmi (4,350 km) at 20 kn (37 km/h)
- Complement: 168
- Armament: 4 × QF 4 in Mark XVI guns on twin mounts Mk. XIX; 4 × QF 2 pdr Mk. VIII on quad mount MK.VII; 2 × 20 mm Oerlikons on single mounts P Mk. III; 2 × 21 in (533 mm) torpedo tubes; 110 depth charges, 4 throwers, 3 racks

HMS Lauderdale was a Hunt-class destroyer of the Royal Navy. Ships of this class were designed as cheap, easily built vessels for convoy escort and antisubmarine duties. She was named like her sisters after a fox hunt, in her case one in Berwickshire. War bonds were issued to finance the building of warships. During Warship Week held in 1942 the civil community of Berwickshire adopted the ship. She has been the only Royal Navy warship to carry this name.

== Service history ==
On commissioning she was allocated for duty in the Western Approaches and crossed the Atlantic to Canada for trials - the only Hunt Class vessel to make the crossing. At the end of March 1942 she returned to Londonderry and undertook North Sea convoy escort duty for the rest of the year.

In 1943 she was allocated for service in the Mediterranean, including support of the allied landings on Sicily in July of that year. In 1944 she continued operations in the Mediterranean and was allocated to support the landings in the South of France. She ended the year in the Adriatic Sea supporting operations there.

In 1945 Lauderdale was allocated for service in the Far East and underwent a refit at Simonstown, South Africa.

== Greek service ==
In 1946 she was transferred to the Royal Hellenic Navy and renamed Aigaion. She was removed from the effective list and returned to British ownership on 12 December 1959 and scrapped in Greece in 1960.

== Publications ==
- Colledge, J. J.; Warlow, Ben (2006) [1969]. Ships of the Royal Navy: The Complete Record of All Fighting Ships of the Royal Navy from the 15th Century to the Present (3rd Rev ed.). London: Chatham Publishing. ISBN 978-1-86176-281-8. OCLC 67375475.
- English, John (1987). The Hunts: a history of the design, development and careers of the 86 destroyers of this class built for the Royal and Allied Navies during World War II. England: World Ship Society. ISBN 0-905617-44-4.
