= HMS Southwold =

British warship

Coordinates: 35°53′N 14°35′E

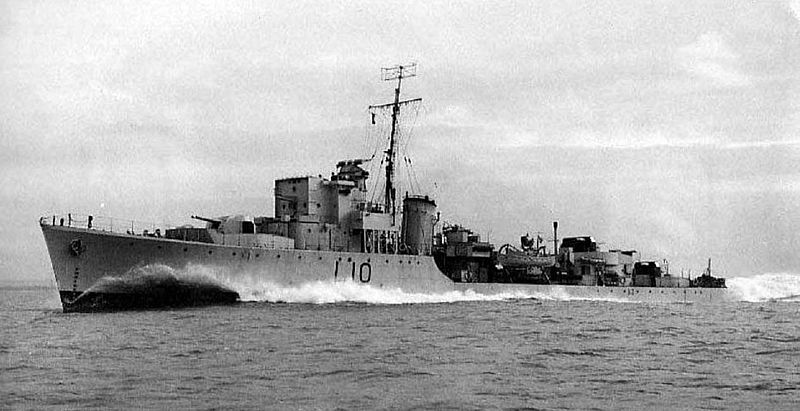

History

United Kingdom
- Name: HMS Southwold
- Ordered: 20 December 1939
- Builder: J. Samuel White
- Laid down: 18 June 1940
- Launched: 29 May 1941
- Commissioned: 9 October 1941
- Honours and awards: Battle honours for: Sirte 1942; Malta Convoys 1942; Libya 1942
- Fate: Hit a mine and sunk on 24 March 1942
- Badge: On a Field Red, in front of two hunting horns in saltire Gold, a castle White

General characteristics
- Class & type: Type II Hunt-class destroyer
- Displacement: 1,050 long tons (1,070 t) standard; 1,430 long tons (1,450 t) full load
- Length: 85.3 m (279 ft 10 in) o/a
- Beam: 9.6 m (31 ft 6 in)
- Draught: 2.51 m (8 ft 3 in)
- Propulsion: 2 Admiralty 3-drum boilers; 2 shaft Parsons geared turbines, 19,000 shp (14,200 kW)
- Speed: 27 knots (31 mph; 50 km/h); 25.5 kn (29.3 mph; 47.2 km/h) full
- Range: 3,600 nmi (6,700 km) at 14 kn (26 km/h)
- Complement: 164
- Armament: 6 × QF 4 in Mark XVI guns on twin mounts Mk. XIX; 4 × QF 2 pdr Mk. VIII on quad mount MK.VII; 2 × 20 mm Oerlikons on single mounts P Mk. III; 110 depth charges, 2 throwers, 3 racks

HMS Southwold was a Type II British Hunt-class destroyer built for the Royal Navy during World War II. She served in the Mediterranean for a few months until she was sunk off Malta in March 1942.

== History ==
Southwold was ordered on 20 December 1939, and was built by J. Samuel White and Company of East Cowes as part of the 1939 emergency program. Her keel was laid on 18 June 1940 with Job number J6274, and the ship was launched on 29 May of the following year. The vessel was completed on 9 October 1941.

After she was completed, Southwold went to Scapa Flow for trials, after which she joined the Mediterranean Fleet. On 16 November 1941 Southwold joined convoy WS12Z at the ocean escort Clyde Assembly point. The ship detached from the convoy on 14 December and made an independent passage from Mombasa to Alexandria.

On 5 January 1942 she joined the 5th Destroyer Flotilla for patrol and convoy escort duties. She deployed a supply of stores and embarked troops to Tobruk. On 12 February she was part of the Malta Convoy MW9B but the convoy was under heavy air attack so it returned to Alexandria.

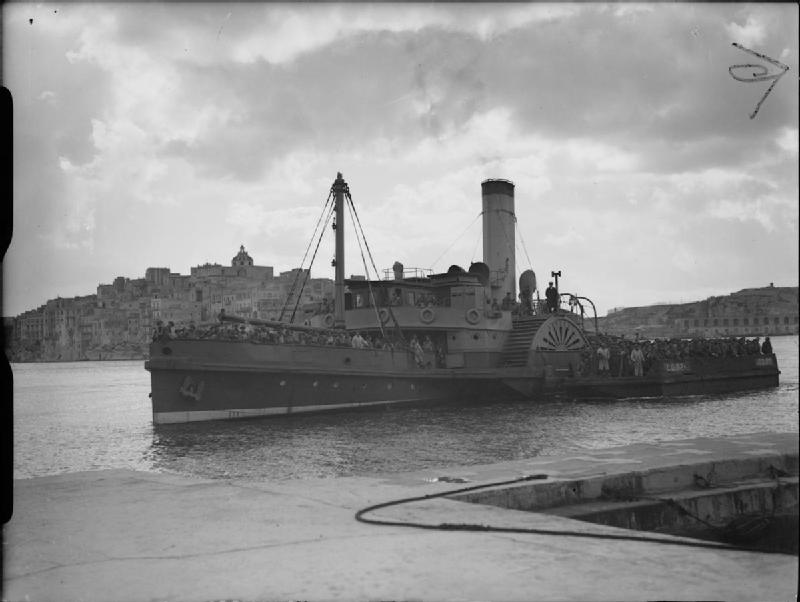
The tug Ancient which towed the damaged Southwold just before her hull split

On 20 March 1942, she carried out an anti-submarine sweep along planned path for Malta relief convoy MW10 along with some other destroyers. On 21 March, she joined this same convoy and took part in the Second Battle of Sirte a day later. On the 23rd she and HMS Beaufort left the convoy to escort HMS Breconshire to Malta.

On 24 March, Southwold was attempting to pass a line to Breconshire when she activated a British mine and there was an explosion in which an officer and four ratings were killed . She sustained major structural damage and the engine room flooded while electrical supplies failed. She was towed by the tug Ancient but the hull split and she began to sink. The survivors were rescued by HMS Dulverton.

== Wreck ==
The wreck of Southwold lies in two sections about 1.5 miles (2.4 km) of Marsaskala Bay, Malta. The bow is the largest piece, about 40 metres (130 ft) in length, and it lies on its starboard side at a depth of 70 metres (230 ft). The stern, which is located about 300 metres (980 ft) away from the bow, is about 28 metres (92 ft) long and it lies upright in 72 metres (236 ft) of water.

== Publications ==
- Colledge, J. J.; Warlow, Ben (2006) [1969]. Ships of the Royal Navy: The Complete Record of All Fighting Ships of the Royal Navy from the 15th Century to the Present (3rd Rev ed.). London: Chatham Publishing. ISBN 978-1-86176-281-8. OCLC 67375475.
- English, John (1987). The Hunts: a history of the design, development and careers of the 86 destroyers of this class built for the Royal and Allied Navies during World War II. England: World Ship Society. ISBN 0-905617-44-4.
