= HMS Blean =

Destroyer of the Royal Navy

Coordinates: 35°55′N 1°50′W

- Blean in dazzle camouflage

History

United Kingdom
- Name: HMS Blean
- Ordered: 28 July 1940
- Builder: Hawthorn Leslie, Hebburn-on-Tyne
- Laid down: 22 February 1941
- Launched: 15 January 1942
- Commissioned: 23 August 1942
- Identification: Pennant number: L47
- Fate: Torpedoed on 11 December 1942

General characteristics
- Type: Type III Hunt-class destroyer
- Displacement: 1,050 long tons (1,070 t) standard; 1,435 long tons (1,458 t) full load
- Length: 85.3 m (279 ft 10 in) o/a
- Beam: 10.16 m (33 ft 4 in)
- Draught: 3.51 m (11 ft 6 in)
- Propulsion: 2 Admiralty 3-drum boilers; 2 shaft Parsons geared turbines, 19,000 shp (14,000 kW)
- Speed: 27 knots (50 km/h; 31 mph); 25.5 knots (47.2 km/h; 29.3 mph) full
- Range: 2,350 nmi (4,350 km) at 20 kn (37 km/h)
- Complement: 168
- Armament: 4 × QF 4-inch (102 mm) Mark XVI on twin mounts Mk. XIX; 4 × QF 2-pounder Mk. VIII on quad mount MK.VII; 2 × 20 mm Oerlikons on single mounts P Mk. III; 2 × 21 inch (533 mm) torpedo tubes; 110 depth charges, 4 throwers, 3 racks

HMS Blean was a Type III Hunt-class destroyer of the Royal Navy. She was named after the Blean Beagles Hunt at the village of Blean just north of Canterbury. She had the shortest career of any of the Hunt-class destroyers.

Built at Hebburn-on-Tyne by Hawthorn Leslie, she was laid down on 22 February 1941, launched on 15 January 1942 and commissioned on 23 August 1942.

== Service history ==
After working up at Scapa Flow followed by some repairs on the Thames she escorted a convoy to Gibraltar arriving on 2 November 1942. She then joined the 58th Destroyer Division escorting Operation Torch convoys. While escorting the British convoy MKF-4 off the Algerian coast, Blean was torpedoed by U-443 on 11 December 1942 11 miles (18 km) north-west of Oran. The U-boat aimed one torpedo against her and then one against the convoy, but both hit Blean and she sank within four minutes with the loss of 89 men.

A memorial to her was unveiled in the church of St. Cosmus and St. Damian in the village of Blean on 10 December 2006.

== Publications ==
- Colledge, J. J.; Warlow, Ben (2006) [1969]. Ships of the Royal Navy: The Complete Record of All Fighting Ships of the Royal Navy from the 15th Century to the Present (3rd Rev ed.). London: Chatham Publishing. ISBN 978-1-86176-281-8. OCLC 67375475.
- English, John (1987). The Hunts: A history of the design, development and careers of the 86 destroyers of this class built for the Royal and Allied Navies during World War II. World Ship Society. ISBN 0-905617-44-4.
