= German submarine U-443 =

German World War II submarine

Coordinates: 36°55′N 2°25′E

History

Nazi Germany
- Name: U-443
- Ordered: 13 April 1940
- Builder: Schichau-Werke, Danzig
- Yard number: 1498
- Laid down: 10 February 1941
- Launched: 31 January 1942
- Commissioned: 18 April 1942
- Fate: Sunk on 23 February 1943

General characteristics
- Class & type: Type VIIC submarine
- Displacement: 769 tonnes (757 long tons) surfaced; 871 t (857 long tons) submerged
- Length: 67.10 m (220 ft 2 in) o/a; 50.50 m (165 ft 8 in) pressure hull
- Beam: 6.20 m (20 ft 4 in) o/a; 4.70 m (15 ft 5 in) pressure hull
- Height: 9.60 m (31 ft 6 in)
- Draught: 4.74 m (15 ft 7 in)
- Installed power: 2,800–3,200 PS (2,100–2,400 kW; 2,800–3,200 bhp) (diesels); 750 PS (550 kW; 740 shp) (electric)
- Propulsion: 2 shafts; 2 × diesel engines; 2 × electric motors
- Speed: 17.7 knots (32.8 km/h; 20.4 mph) surfaced; 7.6 knots (14.1 km/h; 8.7 mph) submerged
- Range: 8,500 nmi (15,700 km; 9,800 mi) at 10 knots (19 km/h; 12 mph) surfaced; 80 nmi (150 km; 92 mi) at 4 knots (7.4 km/h; 4.6 mph) submerged
- Test depth: 230 m (750 ft); Crush depth: 250–295 m (820–968 ft)
- Complement: 4 officers, 40–56 enlisted
- Armament: 5 × 53.3 cm (21 in) torpedo tubes (four bow, one stern); 14 × torpedoes; 1 × 8.8 cm (3.46 in) deck gun (220 rounds); 1 x 2 cm (0.79 in) C/30 AA gun

Service record
- Part of: 8th U-boat Flotilla; 18 April 1942 – 30 September 1942; 9th U-boat Flotilla; 1 October 1942 – 31 December 1942; 29th U-boat Flotilla; 1 January 1943 – 23 February 1943
- Identification codes: M 44 676
- Commanders: Kptlt. Konstantin von Puttkamer; 18 April 1942 – 23 February 1943
- Operations: 3 patrols: 1st patrol: 1 October – 4 November 1942; 2nd patrol: 29 November – 22 December 1942; 3rd patrol: 16 – 23 February 1943
- Victories: 3 merchant ships sunk (19,435 GRT); 1 warship sunk (1,087 tons)

German submarine U-443 was a Type VIIC U-boat built for Nazi Germany's Kriegsmarine for service during World War II.

She was laid down at Schichau-Werke, Danzig, on 10 February 1941, launched on 31 January 1942 and commissioned on 18 April with Oberleutnant zur See Konstantin von Puttkamer in command. She served with the 8th U-boat Flotilla for training, then with the 9th flotilla from 1 October 1942 until 31 December 1942, and the 29th flotilla from 1 January 1943 until 23 February for operations.

U-443 completed three patrols, sinking three merchant ships totalling 19,435 gross register tons (GRT) and one warship of 1,087 GRT.

== Design ==
German Type VIIC submarines were preceded by the shorter Type VIIB submarines. U-443 had a displacement of 769 tonnes (757 long tons) when at the surface and 871 tonnes (857 long tons) while submerged. She had a total length of 67.10 m (220 ft 2 in), a pressure hull length of 50.50 m (165 ft 8 in), a beam of 6.20 m (20 ft 4 in), a height of 9.60 m (31 ft 6 in), and a draught of 4.74 m (15 ft 7 in). The submarine was powered by two Germaniawerft F46 four-stroke, six-cylinder supercharged diesel engines producing a total of 2,800 to 3,200 metric horsepower (2,060 to 2,350 kW; 2,760 to 3,160 shp) for use while surfaced, two AEG GU 460/8–27 double-acting electric motors producing a total of 750 metric horsepower (550 kW; 740 shp) for use while submerged. She had two shafts and two 1.23 m (4 ft) propellers. The boat was capable of operating at depths of up to 230 metres (750 ft).

The submarine had a maximum surface speed of 17.7 knots (32.8 km/h; 20.4 mph) and a maximum submerged speed of 7.6 knots (14.1 km/h; 8.7 mph). When submerged, the boat could operate for 80 nautical miles (150 km; 92 mi) at 4 knots (7.4 km/h; 4.6 mph); when surfaced, she could travel 8,500 nautical miles (15,700 km; 9,800 mi) at 10 knots (19 km/h; 12 mph). U-443 was fitted with five 53.3 cm (21 in) torpedo tubes (four fitted at the bow and one at the stern), fourteen torpedoes, one 8.8 cm (3.46 in) SK C/35 naval gun, 220 rounds, and a 2 cm (0.79 in) C/30 anti-aircraft gun. The boat had a complement of between forty-four and sixty.

== Service history ==
=== First patrol ===
U-443 began her operational service when she departed Kiel on 1 October 1942 and sailed out into the Atlantic, clearing the northern coast of Scotland. On 9 October in rough weather, a lookout broke his arm. The U-boat sank two ships from Convoy ON 139 in mid-Atlantic on 22 October, but was then forced to submerge where she was held by the escort ships until the convoy had escaped. She subsequently steamed into Brest in occupied France, arriving on 4 November.

=== Second patrol ===
Her second sortie saw her leave Brest on 29 November 1942, penetrate the heavily defended Strait of Gibraltar, sink two more ships in the western Mediterranean and arrive at the Italian port of La Spezia on 22 December.

=== Third patrol and loss ===
The U-boat left La Spezia on 16 February 1943 and headed southwest. She was sunk with all hands on 23 February northwest of Algiers by depth charges from the escort destroyers HMS Bicester, Lamerton and Wheatland.

=== Wolfpacks ===
U-443 took part in two wolfpacks, namely:

- Panther (11 – 16 October 1942)
- Puma (16 – 29 October 1942)

== Summary of raiding history ==
Date	Ship Name	Nationality	Tonnage (Note: Merchant ship tonnages are in gross register tons. Military vessels are listed by tons displacement.)	Fate
22 October 1942	Donax	United Kingdom	8,036	Sunk
22 October 1942	Winnipeg II	United Kingdom	9,807	Sunk
11 December 1942	HMS Blean	Royal Navy	1,087	Sunk
14 December 1942	Edencrag	United Kingdom	1,592	Sunk

== See also ==
- Mediterranean U-boat Campaign (World War II)

== Bibliography ==
- Bishop, Chris (2006). Kriegsmarine U-Boats, 1939-45. London: Amber Books. ISBN 978-1-904687-96-2.
- Busch, Rainer; Röll, Hans-Joachim (1999). German U-boat commanders of World War II : a biographical dictionary. Translated by Brooks, Geoffrey. London, Annapolis, Md: Greenhill Books, Naval Institute Press. ISBN 1-55750-186-6.
- Busch, Rainer; Röll, Hans-Joachim (1999). Deutsche U-Boot-Verluste von September 1939 bis Mai 1945 [German U-boat losses from September 1939 to May 1945]. Der U-Boot-Krieg (in German). Vol. IV. Hamburg, Berlin, Bonn: Mittler. ISBN 3-8132-0514-2.
- Gröner, Erich; Jung, Dieter; Maass, Martin (1991). U-boats and Mine Warfare Vessels. German Warships 1815–1945. Vol. 2. Translated by Thomas, Keith; Magowan, Rachel. London: Conway Maritime Press. ISBN 0-85177-593-4.
- Kemp, Paul (1999). U-Boats Destroyed - German Submarine Losses in the World Wars. London: Arms & Armour. ISBN 1-85409-515-3.
