= HMS Quantock =

Destroyer of the Royal Navy

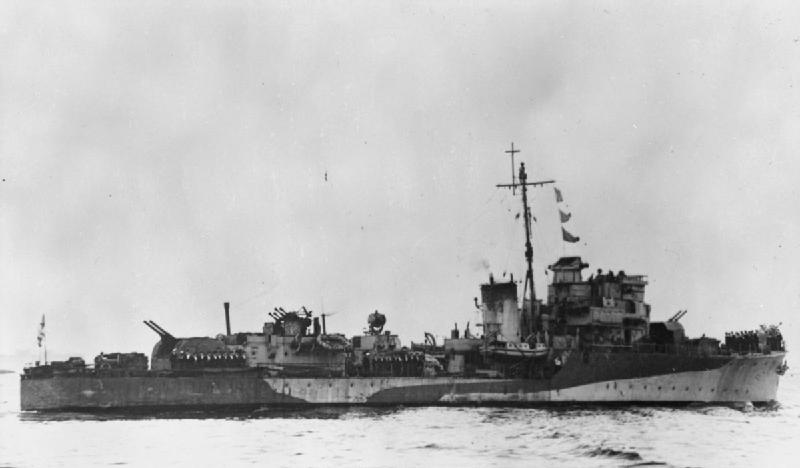
- HMS Quantock c.1941 (IWM)

History

United Kingdom
- Name: HMS Quantock
- Ordered: 11 April 1939
- Builder: Scotts, Greenock
- Laid down: 26 July 1939
- Launched: 22 April 1940
- Commissioned: 6 February 1941
- Identification: Pennant number:L58
- Fate: Sold to Ecuadorian Navy
- Badge: On a Field Green, in front of two antlers in saltire a bugle horn palewise Gold.

History

Ecuador
- Name: Presidente Alfaro
- Acquired: 18 October 1954
- Commissioned: 16 August 1955
- Decommissioned: 1978
- Identification: DD1
- Fate: Scrapped

General characteristics
- Class & type: Type I Hunt-class destroyer
- Displacement: 1,050 long tons (1,070 t) standard; 1,430 long tons (1,450 t) full load
- Length: 85.3 m (279 ft 10 in) o/a
- Beam: 9.6 m (31 ft 6 in)
- Draught: 2.51 m (8 ft 3 in)
- Propulsion: 2 Admiralty 3-drum boilers; 2 shaft Parsons geared turbines, 19,000 shp (14,170 kW)
- Speed: 27.5 knots (31.6 mph; 50.9 km/h); 26 kn (29.9 mph; 48.2 km/h) full
- Range: 3,500 nmi (6,500 km) at 15 kn (28 km/h); 1,000 nmi (1,850 km) at 26 kn (48 km/h)
- Complement: 164
- Armament: 4 × QF 4-inch (102 mm) Mark XVI guns on twin mounts Mk. XIX; 4 × QF 2-pounder (40 mm) Mk. VIII AA guns on quad mount MK.VII; 2 × 20 mm Oerlikon AA guns on single mounts P Mk. III; 50 depth charges, 2 throwers, 1 rack

HMS Quantock was a Type I Hunt-class destroyer of the Royal Navy which served in World War II. She was sold to Ecuador in 1954 where she served as Presidente Alfaro.

== History in the Royal Navy ==
Quantock was ordered on 11 April 1939 under the 1939 War Emergency Build Programme. She was laid down as Job No. J112. She was commissioned in February 1941. She was adopted by the civil community of Ashton-under-Lyne in Lancashire as part of Warship Week in 1942.

She earned battle honours during the Second World War for North Sea 1941-1945, Atlantic 1943, Sicily 1943, Salerno 1943 and Adriatic 1944.

Following the war she was used as an air target training ship, before being transferred to the Reserve Fleet. She remained there until 1954 when she was sold to Ecuador, along with another Hunt-Class destroyer Meynell.

== History in the Ecuadorian Navy ==
Following sale Quantock underwent a refit by J. Samuel White and Company, on the Isle of Wight, which was completed in 1955.

She was commissioned as Presidente Alfaro in August 1955 when she was taken over by the Ecuadorian Navy at Portsmouth Dockyard.

She served until 1978, when she was struck from the active list, before being sold for scrapping.

== Publications ==
Colledge, J. J.; Warlow, Ben (2006) [1969]. Ships of the Royal Navy: The Complete Record of All Fighting Ships of the Royal Navy from the 15th Century to the Present (3rd Rev ed.). London: Chatham Publishing. ISBN 978-1-86176-281-8. OCLC 67375475.
