= HMS Pytchley (L92) =

Destroyer of the Royal Navy

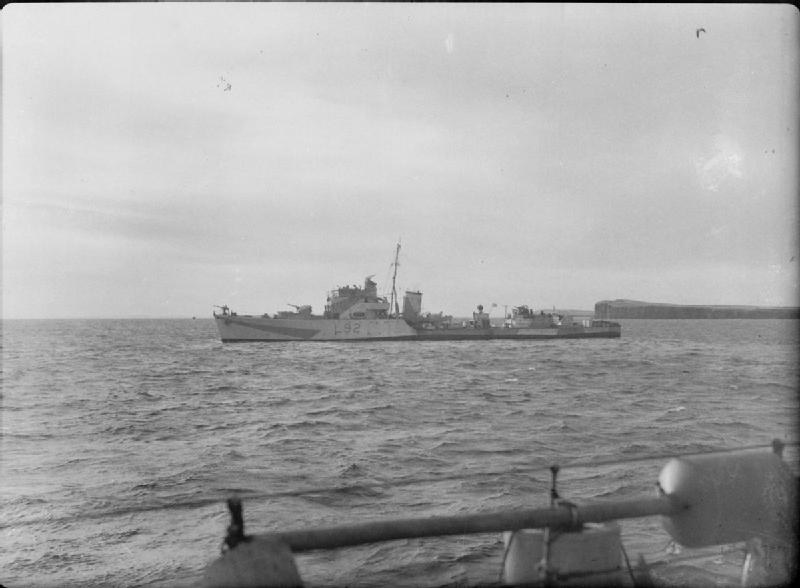
- HMS Pytchley in coastal waters, c1941 (IWM)

History

United Kingdom
- Name: HMS Pytchley
- Ordered: 11 April 1939
- Builder: Scotts Shipbuilding and Engineering Company, Greenock
- Laid down: 26 July 1939
- Launched: 13 February 1940
- Completed: 23 October 1940
- Decommissioned: 1946
- Identification: Pennant number:L92
- Honours and awards: North Sea 1942–45; English Channel 1942–44; Arctic 1943; Normandy 1944
- Fate: Scrapped, 1956
- Badge: On a Field Red two hunting horns in Saltire and a mascle in fret, all Gold

General characteristics
- Class & type: Type I Hunt-class destroyer
- Displacement: 1,050 long tons (1,070 t) standard; 1,430 long tons (1,450 t) full load
- Length: 85.3 m (279 ft 10 in) o/a
- Beam: 9.6 m (31 ft 6 in)
- Draught: 2.51 m (8 ft 3 in)
- Propulsion: 2 Admiralty 3-drum boilers; 2 shaft Parsons geared turbines, 19,000 shp (14,170 kW)
- Speed: 27.5 knots (31.6 mph; 50.9 km/h); 26 kn (29.9 mph; 48.2 km/h) full
- Range: 3,500 nmi (6,500 km) at 15 kn (28 km/h); 1,000 nmi (1,850 km) at 26 kn (48 km/h)
- Complement: 164
- Armament: 4 × QF 4-inch (102 mm) Mark XVI guns on twin mounts Mk. XIX; 4 × QF 2-pounder (40 mm) Mk. VIII AA guns on quad mount MK.VII; 2 × 20 mm Oerlikon AA guns on single mounts P Mk. III; 50 depth charges, 2 throwers, 1 rack

HMS Pytchley was a Type I Hunt-class destroyer of the Royal Navy which served in World War II. She was scrapped in 1956.

== Service history ==
Pytchley was ordered on 11 April 1939 under the 1939 War Emergency Build Programme as job number J111. She was completed on 23 October 1940. She was adopted by the Municipal Borough of Kettering in Northamptonshire as part of Warship Week in 1942.

She earned battle honours during the Second World War for the North Sea 1941–1945, where she spent the majority of her service. During 1941 she struck a mine off Flamborough Head and was subsequently repaired on the River Tyne. In June 1944 she formed part of the naval escort supporting the Normandy landings, providing support during the assault on Gold Beach.

Following the war she was employed as an aircraft target ship in December 1945. She then transferred to the Reserve Fleet at Devonport in 1946.

She remained there until sold to BISCO for scrap. She arrived at the breakers yard at Llanlley on 1 December 1956.

== Publications ==
- Colledge, J. J.; Warlow, Ben (2006) [1969]. Ships of the Royal Navy: The Complete Record of All Fighting Ships of the Royal Navy from the 15th Century to the Present (3rd Rev ed.). London: Chatham Publishing. ISBN 978-1-86176-281-8. OCLC 67375475.
- English, John (1987). The Hunts: A history of the design, development and careers of the 86 destroyers of this class built for the Royal and Allied Navies during World War II. World Ship Society. ISBN 0-905617-44-4.
