= HMS Eggesford =

Destroyer of the Royal Navy

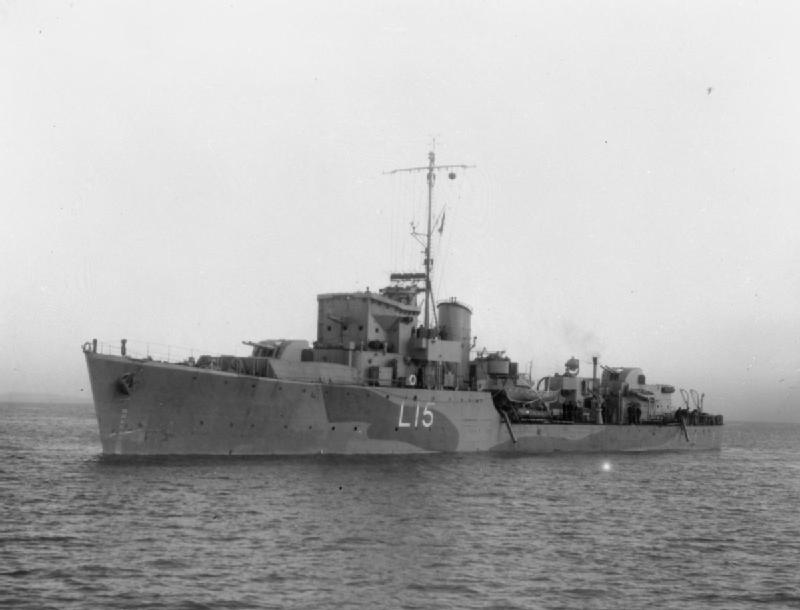
- HMS Eggesford, c. 1943 (IWM)

History

United Kingdom
- Name: HMS Eggesford
- Ordered: 28 July 1940
- Builder: J Samuel White Ltd, Isle of Wight
- Laid down: 23 June 1941
- Launched: 12 September 1942
- Commissioned: 21 January 1943
- Identification: Pennant number: L15
- Fate: Sold to West Germany, 11 November 1957
- Badge: On a Field barry wavy of four White and Blue a goat's head erased Black gorged with a chain Gold, suspended therefrom by a link chain, a bugle horn also Gold

History

West Germany
- Name: Brommy
- Acquired: 11 November 1957
- Commissioned: 14 May 1959
- Decommissioned: 1968
- Identification: Pennant number: F218
- Fate: Sold for scrap 1969

General characteristics
- Class & type: Type III Hunt-class destroyer
- Displacement: 1,050 long tons (1,070 t) standard, 1,490 long tons (1,510 t) full load
- Length: 264 ft 3 in (80.54 m) pp, 280 ft (85.34 m) oa
- Beam: 31 ft 6 in (9.60 m)
- Draught: 7 ft 9 in (2.36 m)
- Propulsion: 2 Admiralty 3-drum boilers; 2 shaft Parsons geared turbines, 19,000 shp (14,000 kW)
- Speed: 27 kn (50 km/h; 31 mph)
- Range: 3,700 nmi (6,900 km; 4,300 mi) at 14 kn (26 km/h; 16 mph)
- Complement: 168
- Armament: 4 × QF 4 in Mark XVI guns on twin mounts Mk. XIX; 5 × QF 2 pdr Mk. VIII (1 × quad mount and 1 × single bow chaser mount); 3 × 20 mm Oerlikons; 2 × 21 in (533 mm) torpedo tubes; 70 depth charges, 4 throwers, 2 racks

HMS Eggesford was a Type III Hunt-class destroyer of the Royal Navy. She entered service in January 1943, carrying out convoy escort, patrol and anti-shipping attacks for most of the rest of the Second World War. In 1957, she was sold to the West German Navy, serving as a training ship for the submarine weapons school until 1968.

== Royal Navy Service ==
HMS Eggesford was one of the Type III Hunt class. These differed from the previous Type II ships in replacing a twin 4-inch gun mount by two torpedo tubes to improve their ability to operate as destroyers. During the Second World War Eggesford was awarded battle honours for Sicily 1943, Salerno 1943, Adriatic 1944 and South France 1944. In July 1945 she sailed for the Far East, but arrived too late for operational service.

At the end of 1945 Eggesford returned to Britain and was allocated to the basic anti-submarine training flotilla. In 1946 she went into reserve and in 1952 was laid up at Penarth before transfer to the West German Navy.

== West German Navy service ==
In May 1956, Eggesford was one of seven frigates selected for transfer to the new West German Navy, being sold on 11 November 1957, and refitted in Liverpool before commissioning in the German Navy on 14 May 1959 as Brommy. In 1962 she was refitted by the Palmers Hebburn works of Vickers-Armstrong and again refitted in 1963.

Brommy decommissioned in 1968 and was sold for scrap in 1969.

== Publications ==
- Blackman, Raymond V.B. (1962). Jane's Fighting Ships 1962–63. Sampson Low, Marston & Co. Ltd.
- Colledge, J. J.; Warlow, Ben (2006) [1969]. Ships of the Royal Navy: The Complete Record of All Fighting Ships of the Royal Navy from the 15th Century to the Present (3rd Rev ed.). London: Chatham Publishing. ISBN 978-1-86176-281-8. OCLC 67375475.
- Critchley, Mike (1982). British Warships Since 1945: Part 3: Destroyers. Liskeard, UK: Maritime Books. ISBN 0-9506323-9-2.
- English, John (2001). Afridi to Nizam: British Fleet Destroyers 1937–43. Gravesend, UK: World Ship Society. OCLC 49841510. ISBN 0-905617-95-0.
- English, John (1987). The Hunts: A history of the design, development and careers of the 86 destroyers of this class built for the Royal and Allied Navies during World War II. World Ship Society. ISBN 0-905617-44-4.
- Gardiner, Robert; Chesneau, Roger, eds. (1980). Conway's All The World's Fighting Ships 1922–1946. London: Conway Maritime Press. ISBN 0-85177-146-7.
- Gardiner, Robert; Chumbley, Stephen, eds. (1995). Conway's All The World's Fighting Ships 1947–1995. Annapolis, Maryland: Naval Institute Press. ISBN 1-55750-132-7.
- Lenton, H.T. (1970). Navies of the Second World War: British Fleet & Escort Destroyers Volume Two. London: Macdonald & Co. ISBN 0-356-03122-5.
- Whitley, M.J. (2000). Destroyers of World War Two: An International Encyclopedia. London: Cassell & Co. ISBN 1-85409-521-8.
