= HMS Cleveland (L46) =

Destroyer of the Royal Navy

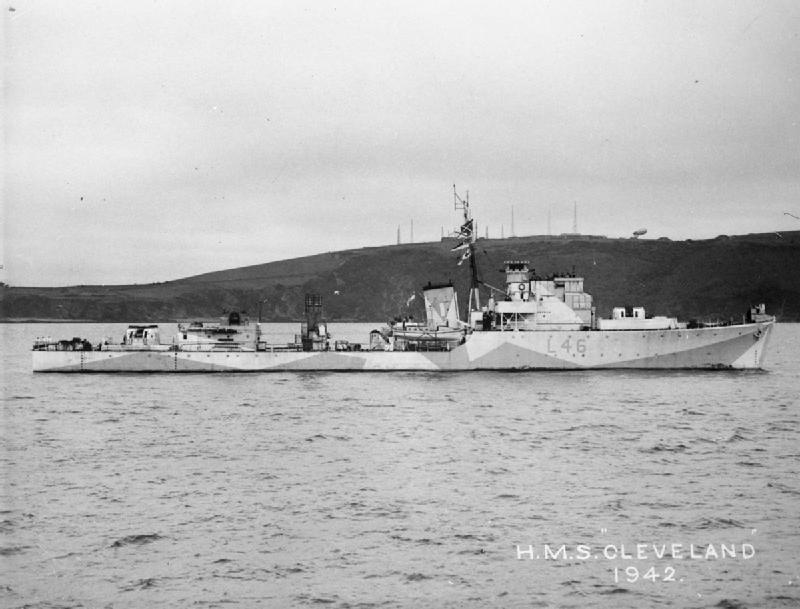
- HMS Cleveland in Plymouth Sound, October 1942

History

United Kingdom
- Name: HMS Cleveland
- Ordered: 21 March 1939
- Builder: Yarrow Shipbuilders, Glasgow
- Yard number: Admiralty Job No.1835
- Laid down: 7 July 1939
- Launched: 24 April 1940
- Completed: 18 September 1940
- Identification: Pennant number: L46
- Honours and awards: Basque Roads 1809; Atlantic 1942; English Channel 1942; North Sea 1943; Sicily 1943; Salerno 1943; South France 1944; Aegean 1944; Adriatic 1944
- Fate: Scrapped in December 1959
- Badge: On a Field per fess wavy Red and Blue, upon a White roundel a huntsman's cap Black in front of a stirrup Red.

General characteristics
- Class & type: Type I Hunt-class destroyer
- Displacement: 1,000 long tons (1,016 t) standard; 1,340 long tons (1,362 t) full load
- Length: 85 m (278 ft 10 in) o/a
- Beam: 8.8 m (28 ft 10 in)
- Draught: 3.27 m (10 ft 9 in)
- Propulsion: 2 Admiralty 3-drum boilers; 2 shaft Parsons geared turbines, 19,000 shp
- Speed: 27.5 knots (31.6 mph; 50.9 km/h); 26 kn (30 mph; 48 km/h) full
- Range: 3,500 nmi (6,500 km) at 15 kn (28 km/h); 1,000 nmi (1,900 km) at 26 kn (48 km/h)
- Complement: 146
- Armament: 4 × QF 4-inch (102 mm) Mark XVI guns on twin mounts Mk. XIX; 4 × QF 2-pounder (40 mm) Mk VIII AA guns on quad mount MK.VII; 2 × 20-mm Oerlikon AA guns on single mounts P Mk. III; 40 depth charges, 2 throwers, 1 rack

HMS Cleveland (L46) was a Type I Hunt-class destroyer of the Royal Navy built by Yarrow Shipbuilders of Scotstoun, and launched on 24 April 1940. She was adopted by the civil community of Middlesbrough then in the North Riding of Yorkshire, as part of the Warship Week campaign in 1942.

== Service history ==
On commissioning in 1940, she completed work ups for service in home waters, both the North Sea and the English Channel, which continued throughout 1941 and 1942. During April 1943, she was nominated for service in the Mediterranean. During that year, she provided cover for the Allied landings in Italy on Sicily (Operation Husky) and at Salerno (Operation Avalanche). During 1944, she was again deployed in the Mediterranean and in the Aegean Sea.

On 29 September 1945, Cleveland steamed from Gibraltar to Devonport and was placed in reserve. She was sold for scrapping and was wrecked at Llangennith beach on the Gower Peninsula in Wales, on 28 June 1957 while under tow to Llanelli, for scrapping. The wreck was stripped and blown up in December 1959. The years of salvage and stripping of the Cleveland on Llangennith beach were captured by an amateur film maker, Evan Morgan from Pontypridd, who compiled a silent film of the process

== Publications ==
- Colledge, J. J.; Warlow, Ben (2006) [1969]. Ships of the Royal Navy: The Complete Record of All Fighting Ships of the Royal Navy from the 15th Century to the Present (3rd Rev ed.). London: Chatham Publishing. ISBN 978-1-86176-281-8. OCLC 67375475.
