= Greek destroyer Miaoulis (L91) =

Hunt-class destroyer

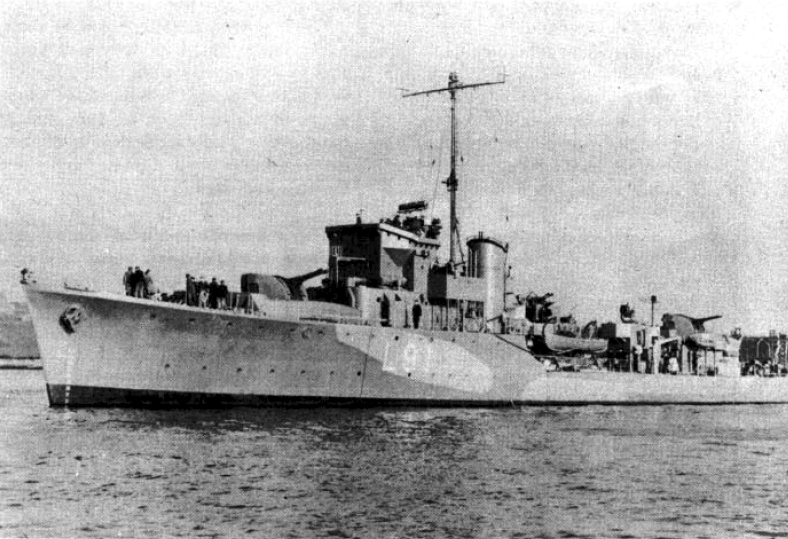
- Miaoulis - ΒΠ Μιαούλης (L91)

History

United Kingdom
- Name: Modbury
- Builder: Swan Hunter and Wigham Richardson Ltd. (Wallsend-on-Tyne)
- Laid down: 5 August 1941
- Launched: 13 April 1942

Greece
- Name: Miaoulis - ΒΠ Μιαούλης
- Namesake: Andreas Miaoulis
- Commissioned: 25 November 1942
- Decommissioned: 1959
- Identification: Pennant number: L91
- Fate: Returned to UK and sold for scrap in 1960

General characteristics
- Class & type: Type III Hunt-class destroyer
- Displacement: Full load 1,490 tons; Standard 1,050 tons
- Length: 85.3 m (280 ft)
- Beam: 11.4 m (37 ft)
- Draft: 2.4 m (7 ft 10 in)
- Propulsion: Boilers: 2 Admiralty 3 drum boilers, Engines: 2 shaft Parsons turbine, Shafts: 2 (twin screw ship), Power: 19,000 shp, (14.2 MW)
- Speed: 26-knot (48 km/h) maximum; 20-knot (37 km/h) maximum operational
- Range: 2,350 nautical miles (4,350 km) at 20.0 knots (37 km/h)
- Complement: 170
- Armament: 4 × 4-inch (102 mm) (2 × 2) guns, one 4 × 40 mm A/A QF 2-pounder pompom gun, 3 × 20 mm A/A, 2 × 21-inch (533 mm) T/T, one depth charge track

Miaoulis (Greek: ΒΠ Μιαούλης) was a Type III Hunt-class destroyer that was originally built for the British Royal Navy as HMS Modbury but never commissioned. Before her completion, she was transferred to the Royal Hellenic Navy and commissioned on 25 November 1942 as Miaoulis in order to relieve heavy losses of ships sustained by the Royal Hellenic Navy during the German invasion of 1941. Miaoulis served in the Mediterranean Theatre throughout the Second World War. On 10 October 1943, during the Dodecanese Campaign, she saved the crew of the British destroyer HMS Panther. She served during the Greek Civil War, was returned to the Royal Navy in 1959 and broken up for scrap in 1960.

== Publications ==
- Colledge, J. J.; Warlow, Ben (2006) [1969]. Ships of the Royal Navy: The Complete Record of All Fighting Ships of the Royal Navy from the 15th Century to the Present (3rd Rev ed.). London: Chatham Publishing. ISBN 978-1-86176-281-8. OCLC 67375475.
