= HMS Catterick =

British naval ship

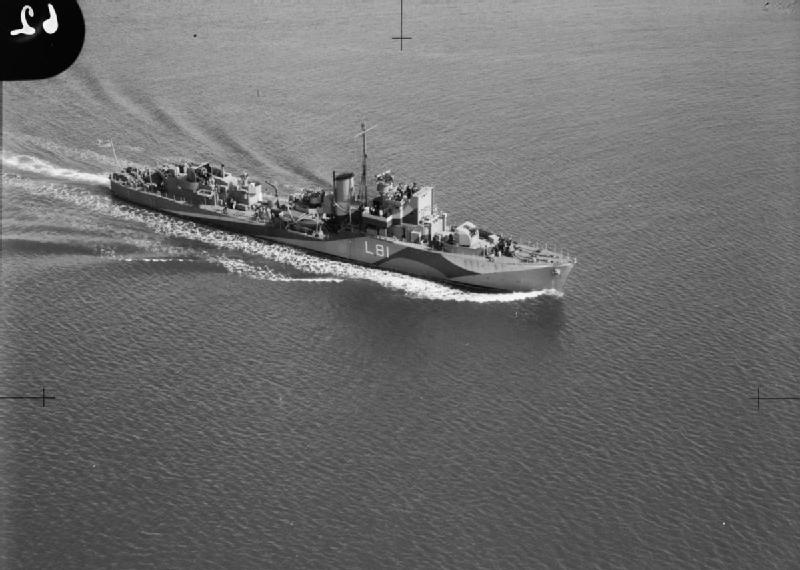

History

United Kingdom
- Name: HMS Catterick
- Ordered: 4 July 1940
- Builder: Vickers-Armstrongs, Barrow
- Laid down: 1 March 1941
- Launched: 22 November 1941
- Commissioned: 12 June 1942
- Identification: Pennant number: L81
- Fate: To Greece 1946

History

Greece
- Name: Admiral Hastings
- Commissioned: 1946
- Stricken: December 1959
- Fate: Scrapped 1963

General characteristics
- Class & type: Type III Hunt-class destroyer
- Displacement: 1,050 long tons (1,067 t) standard, 1,490 long tons (1,514 t) full load
- Length: 264 ft 3 in (80.54 m) pp, 280 ft (85.34 m) oa
- Beam: 31 ft 6 in (9.60 m)
- Draught: 7 ft 9 in (2.36 m)
- Propulsion: 2 Admiralty 3-drum boilers; 2 shaft Parsons geared turbines, 19,000 shp (14,000 kW)
- Speed: 27 kn (50 km/h; 31 mph)
- Range: 3,700 nmi (6,900 km; 4,300 mi) at 14 kn (26 km/h; 16 mph)
- Complement: 168
- Armament: 4 × QF 4 in Mark XVI guns on twin mounts Mk. XIX; 4 × QF 2 pdr Mk. VIII (1 × quad mount); 3 × 20 mm Oerlikons; 2 × 21 in (533 mm) torpedo tubes; 70 depth charges, 4 throwers, 2 racks

HMS Catterick was a Hunt-class destroyer built for use by the British Royal Navy. The ship was built by Vickers-Armstrongs at its Barrow shipyard in 1941–1942, being launched on 22 November 1941 and completed on 12 June 1942.

Catterick served through the remainder of the Second World War, and in 1946 was loaned to the Greek Navy, serving as the Admiral Hastings until stricken in 1959. She was scrapped in 1963.

== Construction and design ==
The Hunt class was meant to fill the Royal Navy's need for a large number of small destroyer-type vessels capable of both convoy escort and operations with the fleet. The Type III Hunts differed from the previous Type II ships in replacing a twin 4-inch gun mount by two torpedo tubes to improve their ability to operate as destroyers. The Type III Hunts were 264 feet 3 inches (80.54 m) long between perpendiculars and 280 feet (85.34 m) overall, with a beam was 31 feet 6 inches (9.60 m) and draught 7 feet 9 inches (2.36 m). Displacement was 1,050 long tons (1,067 t) standard and 1,490 long tons (1,514 t) under full load. Two Admiralty boilers raising steam at 300 pounds per square inch (2,100 kPa) and 620 °F (327 °C) fed Parsons single-reduction geared steam turbines that drove two propeller shafts, generating 19,000 shaft horsepower (14,000 kW) at 380 rpm. This gave a design maximum speed of 27 knots (50 km/h; 31 mph). 345 long tons (351 t) of oil fuel were carried, giving a range of 3,700 nautical miles (6,900 km; 4,300 mi) at 15 knots (28 km/h; 17 mph).

Main gun armament was four 4 inch (102 mm) QF Mk XVI dual purpose (anti-ship and anti-aircraft) guns in two twin mounts, with a quadruple 2-pounder "pom-pom" and three Oerlikon 20 mm cannon providing close-in anti-aircraft fire. Two 21-inch (533 mm) torpedo tubes were fitted in a single twin mount, while two depth charge chutes, four depth charge throwers and 70 depth charges comprised the ship's anti-submarine armament. Type 291 and Type 285 radar was fitted, as was Type 128 sonar.

Catterick was one of the first seven Type III Hunt-class ordered for the Royal Navy on 4 July 1940, as part of the 1940 War Emergency Programme. She was laid down at Vickers-Armstrongs' Barrow shipyard on 1 March 1941, was launched on 22 November that year and completed on 12 June 1942. Catterick was named after a Yorkshire fox hunt, and was the first ship of that name to serve with the Royal Navy. She was allocated the Pennant number L81.

== Service ==
After commissioning, Catterick worked up at Scapa Flow, but this process was interrupted when the destroyer took part in a diversionary operation in support of Convoy PQ 17, in which a fake convoy set out from Scapa with the hope that it would be sighted by German aircraft. The diversion force was not detected by German forces, however. PQ 17 was ordered to scatter due to fears of German surface forces, with 24 ships from the scattered convoy being sunk by German aircraft ands submarines. After completing her work up, Catterick escorted Convoy WS 21 to as far as South Africa, arriving at Simonstown on 26 August. She then joined the 2nd Destroyer Flotilla of the Eastern Fleet, and was deployed on convoy escort duties in South African waters. On 30 November 1942, the German submarine U-177 torpedoed and sank the troopship Llandaff Castle southeast of Lorenço Marques (now Maputo), Mozambique. Catterick and the destroyer Inconstant rescued the survivors from Llandaff Castle on 2 December. Three were killed from a total of 310 passengers and crew aboard the troopship.

In April 1943, Catterick was refitted at Durban, and was then deployed on escorting convoys between Freetown and Capetown. In August 1943, the destroyer escorted the Convoy CF 13 from Freetown to Gibraltar. On 9 September 1943, Catterick took part in Operation Avalanche, the Allied landings at Salerno, escorting the aircraft carriers of Force V. Catterick continued to carry out convoy escort duties in the Mediterranean, serving with the 50th Escort Division until November, then the Mediterranean Hunt Flotilla in November and joining the 18th Destroyer Flotilla based at Malta in December that year.

Catterick continued her escort duties into 1944, and in August 1944 took part in Operation Dragoon, the Allied landings in Southern France, escorting a convoy from Oran to the beachhead. In September–October 1944, Catterick took part in operations to disrupt the German evacuation of the Aegean, and on 8 October, with the cruiser Aurora bombarded the island of Levitha, after which the island's garrison surrendered. In December 1944, Catterick transferred to the 22nd Destroyer Flotilla, based at Alexandria. On 1 May 1945, Catterick, together with the destroyer Kimberley and the Greek Kriti, took part in a raid on German-occupied Rhodes, with Catterick shelling a German-held position. After the end of the fighting in Europe, Catterick returned to Britain to allow her crew to take leave at home, before sailing to Durban for a refit to prepare her for service in the Far East. The refit continued until the end of January 1946 after which, Catterick was sailed to Malta, arriving there on 1 March 1946.

In May 1946, Catterick was transferred on load to Greece, and renamed Admiral Hastings. (Note: After Frank Abney Hastings, a British naval officer who took part in the Greek War of Independence.) (Note: The ship's name in Greek service is written as simply Hastings in some sources.) The ship remained in Greek service until she was stricken on 12 December 1959. She was scrapped at Piraeus in July 1963.
