= HMS Meynell (L82) =

Destroyer of the Royal Navy

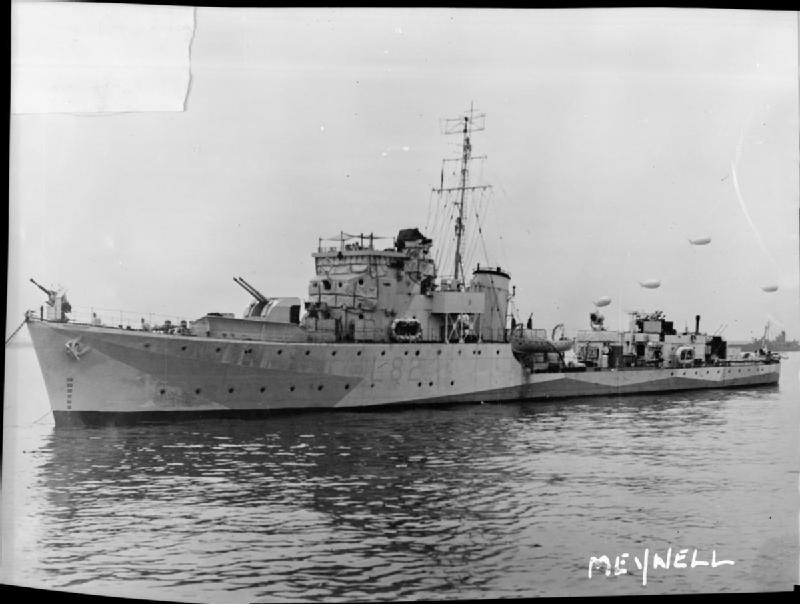
- HMS Meynell in 1941 (IWM)

History

United Kingdom
- Name: HMS Meynell
- Ordered: 11 April 1939
- Builder: Swan Hunter, Wallsend
- Laid down: 10 August 1939
- Launched: 7 June 1940
- Commissioned: 10 December 1940
- Identification: Pennant number:L82
- Fate: Sold to Ecuador, 1954
- Badge: On a Field Red, an escallop Gold charged with a fox's mask Red

Ecuador
- Name: Presidente Velasco Ibarra
- Acquired: 18 October 1954
- Commissioned: 16 August 1955
- Decommissioned: 1978
- Identification: DD2
- Fate: Scrapped

General characteristics
- Class & type: Type I Hunt-class destroyer
- Displacement: 1,050 long tons (1,070 t) standard; 1,430 long tons (1,450 t) full load
- Length: 85.3 m (279 ft 10 in) o/a
- Beam: 9.6 m (31 ft 6 in)
- Draught: 2.51 m (8 ft 3 in)
- Propulsion: 2 Admiralty 3-drum boilers; 2 shaft Parsons geared turbines, 19,000 shp (14,170 kW)
- Speed: 27.5 knots (31.6 mph; 50.9 km/h); 26 kn (29.9 mph; 48.2 km/h) full
- Range: 3,500 nmi (6,500 km) at 15 kn (28 km/h); 1,000 nmi (1,850 km) at 26 kn (48 km/h)
- Complement: 164
- Armament: 4 × QF 4-inch (102 mm) Mark XVI guns on twin mounts Mk. XIX; 4 × QF 2-pounder (40 mm) Mk. VIII AA guns on quad mount MK.VII; 2 × 20 mm Oerlikon AA guns on single mounts P Mk. III; 50 depth charges, 2 throwers, 1 rack

HMS Meynell was a Type I Hunt-class destroyer of the Royal Navy which served in World War II. She was sold to Ecuador in 1954 where she served as Presidente Velasco Ibarra.

== History in the Royal Navy ==
Meynell was ordered on 11 April 1939 from Swan Hunter on the Tyne where she was laid down on 10 August 1939 as Job No. 4117. She was launched on 7 June 1940 and commissioned on 30 December. She was adopted by the civil community of Ashbourne, Derbyshire as part of Warship Week in 1942.

She was part of the 21st Destroyer Flotilla throughout the Second World War and was mostly employed in escorting east coast convoys. In February and March 1943 she was an escort for the arctic convoy JW 53 to Russia and the return convoy RA 53 back to the UK. She also served off Normandy after the landings.

Battle honours awarded were English Channel 1941-1943, North Sea 1941-1945, Arctic 1943 and Normandy 1944.

After the end of the war her armament was removed and she was converted to an aircraft target ship serving in the Mediterranean. However, by the end of 1946 she had been reduced to the reserve, initially at Harwich then subsequently Sheerness and finally Barrow.

In 1954 she was sold to Ecuador.

== History in the Ecuadorian Navy ==
Following sale Meynell underwent a refit by J. Samuel White and Company, on the Isle of Wight, which was completed in 1955.

She was commissioned as Presidente Velasco Ibarra in August 1955.

She served until 1978, when she was struck from the active list, before being sold for scrapping.

== Publications ==
- Colledge, J. J.; Warlow, Ben (2006) [1969]. Ships of the Royal Navy: The Complete Record of All Fighting Ships of the Royal Navy from the 15th Century to the Present (3rd Rev ed.). London: Chatham Publishing. ISBN 978-1-86176-281-8. OCLC 67375475.
- English, John (1987). The Hunts: A history of the design, development and careers of the 86 destroyers of this class built for the Royal and Allied Navies during World War II. World Ship Society. ISBN 0-905617-44-4.
