= Hunt-class destroyer =

Ship class

- HMS Blean, a Type III Hunt-class destroyer

Class overview
- Builders: John Brown & Company; Cammell Laird; Fairfield Shipbuilding and Engineering Company; Hawthorn Leslie and Company; Scotts Shipbuilding and Engineering Company; Alexander Stephen and Sons; Swan Hunter; John I. Thornycroft & Company; J. Samuel White; Vickers-Armstrongs; Yarrow Shipbuilders
- Operators: Royal Navy (72 ships); Royal Hellenic Navy (7); Polish Navy (3); Royal Norwegian Navy (3); Free French Navy (1); After 1945: Federal German Navy (3); Indian Navy (3); Ecuadorian Navy (2); Egyptian Navy (2); Royal Danish Navy (3); Israeli Navy (1)
- Built: 1939–1943
- In commission: 1940–1963
- Completed: 86
- Lost: 23

The Hunt class was a class of escort destroyers built for the Royal Navy during the early stages of the Second World War. The first vessels were ordered in early 1939 as small, economical escorts that could screen the fleet and protect convoys.

The class saw extensive wartime service, particularly in the defence of coastal convoys in the North Sea and English Channel, as well as in operations in the Mediterranean, including the Malta Convoys, the North African campaign, and the invasion of Sicily.

The ships were named after British fox hunts, such as Quorn and Cattistock."

== History ==
Before the Second World War, analysis by the Royal Navy concluded that two types of destroyer were necessary, large, heavily armed vessels designed for fleet operations and smaller, more economical ships for trade protection. Older fleet destroyers were initially reallocated for escort work but they proved unsuited to the role. Their machinery, designed for high-speed manoeuvres, was inefficient at the slower speeds required for convoy escort, significantly reducing their operational range. Their hull forms, built for speed, offered poor sea-keeping at low speeds that was compounded by the addition of new equipment to their superstructures.

A new type of warship was developed, this "fast escort vessel" sacrificed some gun and torpedo armament, as well as some speed, in favour of reduced cost, simplified construction and suitability for mass production. These vessels were later named "escort destroyers". Eighty-six Hunt-class escort destroyers were completed during and shortly after the Second World War. Of these, seventy-two entered service with the Royal Navy and fourteen were transferred to Allied navies under various wartime agreements. A further fourteen ships were transferred to foreign navies in the post-war period.

Wartime transfers
| Name | Recipient navy | Notes |
|---|---|---|
| HMS Haldon | Free French Navy | Renamed FNFL La Combattante |
| HMS Bedale | Free Polish Navy | renamed ORP Ślązak |
| HMS Oakley | Free Polish Navy | Renamed ORP Kujawiak (lost 1942) |
| HMS Silverton | Free Polish Navy | Renamed ORP Krakowiak |
| HMS Bolebroke | Royal Hellenic Navy | Renamed RHS Pindos |
| HMS Border | Royal Hellenic Navy | Renamed RHS Adrias |
| HMS Catterick | Royal Hellenic Navy | Renamed Hastings |
| Hatherleigh | Royal Hellenic Navy | Renamed Kanaris |
| HMS Modbury | Royal Hellenic Navy | Renamed Miaoulis |
| HMS Bramham | Royal Hellenic Navy | Renamed Themistoklis |
| HMS Hursley | Royal Hellenic Navy | Renamed RHS Kriti |
| HMS Glaisdale | Royal Norwegian Navy | Renamed Narvik |
| HMS Eskdale | Royal Norwegian Navy | |
| HMS Badsworth | Royal Norwegian Navy | Renamed Arendal |

== Design ==
The Hunt-class destroyers were based on the 1938 escort sloop Bittern, a 262 ft (80 m) vessel displacing 1,190 tons, powered by 3,300 shp (2,500 kW) on geared steam turbines, capable of speeds up to 18.75 kn (34.73 km/h; 21.58 mph). Her main armament comprised three twin Mark XIX mounts for the 4 in (100 mm) QF Mark XVI dual-purpose gun, which, when engaging aircraft, were directed by the Fuze Keeping Clock anti-aircraft fire control system. The Hunt class was intended to carry a similar armament, with the addition of a quadruple QF 2-pounder Mark VII mount. The hull was designed to be the same length as Bittern, but with a beam reduced by 8 ft (2 m) and increased installed power of 19,000 shp (14,000 kW) to deliver a maximum speed of 27 kn (50 km/h; 31 mph).

The first twenty vessels were ordered in March and April 1939. They were constructed to full Admiralty standards, consistent with contemporary destroyer practice, in contrast to wartime frigate designs, which more closely followed commercial shipbuilding norms. The Hunts presented a significant design challenge. The original concept sacrificed range, beam, and hull size to meet urgent wartime requirements, limiting the class to operations in the North Sea and Mediterranean Sea. These constraints, combined with an overburdened design staff, led to miscalculations. When detailed weight and stability assessments were finally completed, it was found that the design had a centre of gravity higher than expected. As a result, the hull beam had to be increased during construction. Despite this adjustment, the first ships were still found to be up to 70 tons overweight and top-heavy, resulting in dangerously poor stability.

The first twenty ships, already under construction by the time the design flaw was confirmed, had to be modified. The aft 'X' mounting for the 4-inch gun was removed to lower topside weight, and approximately 50 tons of permanent ballast were added to restore some measure of stability. These modified ships became known as the Type I group. The quadruple 2-pounder mount, originally placed abaft the funnel, was moved to the 'X' position on the quarterdeck, which provided a better field of fire.The design deficiency in the Type I Hunt-class destroyers was addressed by modifying the hull dimensions. This involved splitting the hull lengthwise and inserting a 2.5 ft (0.8 m) longitudinal section, increasing the beam to 31 ft 6 in (9.60 m). This improvement provided sufficient stability to carry the originally intended armament without compromising safety. Vessels built to this improved specification formed the Type II group. These also featured a revised bridge layout, with the compass platform extended forward to meet the face of the wheelhouse.

Under the 1939 Emergency War Programme, 36 additional Hunt-class ships were ordered. Of these, three were completed to the original Type I specifications due to construction already being under way when the redesign was implemented. The increased beam of the Type II design also allowed for a substantial rise in depth charge capacity, from 40 charges in the Type I to as many as 110. In the 1940 building programme, it was decided that torpedoes were needed, particularly for operations in the Mediterranean. The next 27 vessels were completed to a further revised design, the Type III group. These ships sacrificed the 'Y' 4-inch gun mounting on the quarterdeck to accommodate a pair of 21-inch torpedo tubes amidships. This modification required the moving of the searchlight to the aft shelter deck. Type III Hunts were readily identifiable by their straight funnels with sloping tops and by the absence of rake in the foremast. Fourteen ships of this group had their stabiliser fins omitted or removed during construction, with the vacant space used for additional fuel oil storage, thereby extending operational range.

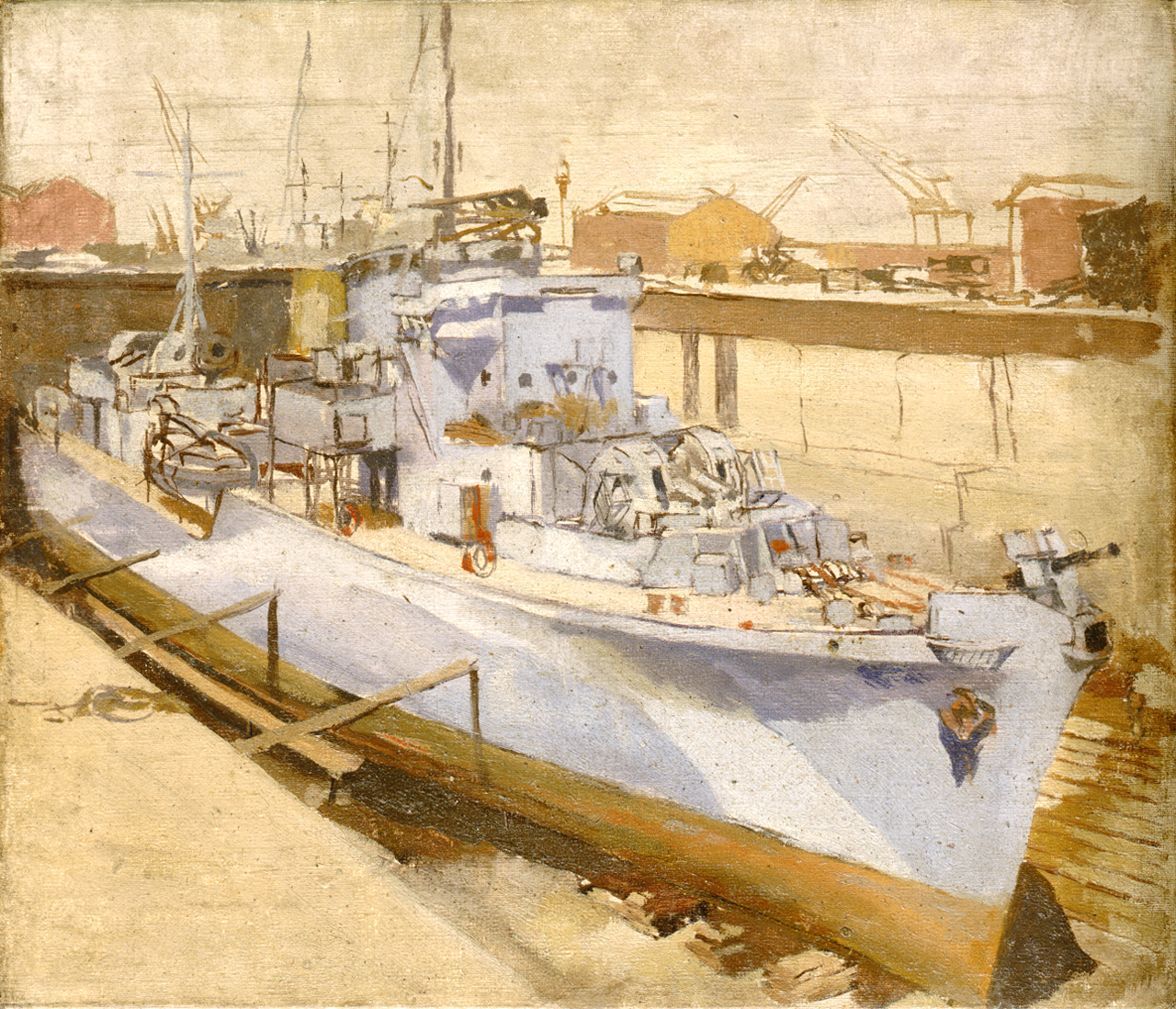
A Hunt-class destroyer in dry dock, painting from the Royal Museums Greenwich

The final two ships of the Hunt class were developed independently from the main series and were based on a private design prepared before the war by John I. Thornycroft & Company. Although initially rejected by the Admiralty in 1938, a revised version was accepted in 1940. These ships became known as the Type IV group. They featured a novel hull form, with a U-shaped forward section incorporating a distinctive double knuckle, and a full centre section with a squared turn at the bilge. This hull configuration was intended to improve low-speed efficiency and reduce rolling, thereby enhancing their effectiveness as gun platforms without the need for ballast or stabilisers. Trials demonstrated an 8 per cent improvement in steaming efficiency at 20 kn (37 km/h; 23 mph), in exchange for only a 2 per cent reduction in maximum speed when proceeding full ahead.

A prominent feature of the Type IV design was the long fo'c'sle, which extended over most of the ship's length. This not only provided significantly improved internal accommodation, a common issue in wartime ships with enlarged crews but also allowed the vessel to be fought almost entirely under cover. The 'X' 4-inch gun mounting was now located at fo'c'sle deck level, rather than on a raised shelter deck as in earlier types. Although the hull was large enough to carry a triple set of 21-inch torpedo tubes, these were also positioned at fo'c'sle deck level, which necessitated the installation of their training gear on a lower deck due to space constraints.

The close-range anti-aircraft armament consisted of a pair of 20 mm Oerlikon guns mounted on the bridge wings and a pair of power-operated twin 0.5-inch Vickers machine guns amidships. The Vickers mountings proved ineffective in service and were soon replaced by the more capable twin Oerlikon Mark V power-operated mountings. The improved accommodation and shelter provided by the extended fo'c'sle were found to be highly beneficial in operational conditions. Crews could remain closed up at action stations for long periods, often in severe weather, with a degree of protection that earlier designs lacked. Although the Type IV was ultimately a developmental cul-de-sac, its features influenced later post-war escort vessel designs. All Hunt-class ships, with the exception of three Type II vessels and the Type IV HMS Brissenden, were originally fitted with fin stabilisers forward to reduce rolling and improve stability as gun platforms. Most of the Type III ships later had these stabilisers removed to increase fuel capacity by 63 long tons (64 t), extending operational endurance.

== Wartime Hunt-class losses ==
Hunt-class destroyers lost in the Second World War
| Name | Year | Cause | Casualties |
|---|---|---|---|
| HMS Exmoor | 1941 | E-boat S30 | 104 killed |
| HMS Airedale | 1942 | 4 Junkers 87 | 45 killed |
| HMS Berkeley | 1942 | Dieppe Raid, Dornier 217 | 16 +Canadian troops |
| HMS Blean | 1942 | U-443 | 89 killed |
| HMS Grove | 1942 | U-77 | 110 killed |
| HMS Eridge | 1942 | Italian MTB MTSM-228 | 5 killed |
| HMS Heythrop | 1942 | U-652 | 15 killed |
| ORP Kujawiak | 1942 | Mine | 13 killed |
| HMS Penylan | 1942 | E-boat S115 | 76 killed |
| HMS Southwold | 1942 | Mine | 5 killed |
| HMS Derwent | 1943 | Torpedo bomber, scrapped | 6 killed |
| HMS Dulverton | 1943 | Hs 293 glider bomb | 78 killed |
| HMS Eskdale | 1943 | E-boats S90, S112 | 25 killed |
| HMS Holcombe | 1943 | U-593 | 84 killed |
| HMS Hurworth | 1943 | Mine | 133 killed |
| HMS Limbourne | 1943 | Torpedo boat T22 | 40 killed |
| HMS Puckeridge | 1943 | U-617 | 6 killed |
| HMS Tynedale | 1943 | U-593 | 66 killed |
| HMS Aldenham | 1944 | Mine | 126 + 2 Yugoslav partisans |
| HMS Goathland | 1944 | Mine, scrapped | 0 |
| HMS Quorn | 1944 | human torpedo | 130 killed |
| HMS Wensleydale | 1944 | Collided with LST 367, scrapped | 0 |
| La Combattante | 1945 | Mine/Seehund KU330 | 68 killed |

== Modifications ==
The Hunt-class destroyer was regarded as a successful and well-balanced design, although limited reserve displacement restricted the scope for modifications. As Oerlikon 20 mm anti-aircraft guns became available, ships were fitted with a pair of single mountings in the bridge wings. The main armament fire control was enhanced by the addition of Type 285 radar, integrated with the Rangefinder-Director Mark I installed on the bridge. For air warning, the initial fit was the Type 286 radar installed at the masthead, which was superseded by Type 291. HMS Cotswold, Silverton, Bleasdale and Wensleydale had their searchlights replaced by the Type 272 radar, a centimetric target indication set developed later in the war.

Ships employed in East Coast convoys or as small headquarters ships during the Normandy landings were equipped with a QF 2-pounder "bow chaser" gun intended for E-boat defence. These included all of the Type Is, except Exmoor and possibly Tynedale, the Type IIs HMS Avon Vale, Cowdray, Lamerton, Lauderdale, and ORP Ślązak, the Type IIIs Albrighton, Bleasdale, Eskdale, Glaisdale, Stevenstone and La Combattante, and the Type IV Brissenden. Later in the war, most Type III ships had their single Oerlikon mounts replaced by powered twin Mark V mountings; some were fitted with two 40 mm Bofors guns, mounted forward of the wheelhouse and on the quarterdeck respectively.

=== Post-war modifications ===
Following the end of the Second World War, a number of Hunt-class destroyers remained in service or were reactivated for emerging Cold War. Several ships underwent modernisation to improve habitability, update equipment, and enhance their utility for secondary roles. Many vessels had their wartime anti-aircraft armament rationalised or reduced, often retaining only a pair of twin 40 mm Bofors guns in powered Mark V mountings. The older 20 mm Oerlikons were generally removed due to their limited effectiveness against post-war threats. Some ships, including HMS Brecon and HMS Catterick, were converted for use as aircraft direction frigates in the early 1950s. These conversions involved the addition of modern air warning and aircraft control equipment, notably the Type 277 height-finder radar and Type 293 target indicator, as well as additional communications fit. Modifications to improve sea keeping and crew comfort included the enclosure of open bridge structures and the upgrading of accommodation and ventilation systems. Ships retained in reserve or placed on extended service often had non-essential wartime fittings stripped to simplify maintenance.

== Ships by Type ==
=== Type I ===
General characteristics Type I
- Displacement: 1,000 long tons (1,000 t) (standard)
- Length: 85 m (278 ft 10 in) (o/a)
- Beam: 8.8 m (28 ft 10 in)
- Draught: 3.27 m (10 ft 9 in)
- Installed power: 2 Admiralty 3-drum boilers; 19,000 shp (14,000 kW)
- Propulsion: 2 shafts; 2 geared steam turbines
- Speed: 27.5 knots (50.9 km/h; 31.6 mph)
- Range: 3,500 nmi (6,500 km; 4,000 mi) at 15 knots (28 km/h; 17 mph)
- Complement: 146
- Armament: 2 × twin QF 4 in (102 mm) dual-purpose guns; 1 × quadruple 2 pdr (40 mm (1.6 in)) AA guns; 2 × single 20 mm (0.8 in) Oerlikon AA guns; 2 × depth charge throwers, 1 rack, 40 depth charges

The first ten of the following were ordered on 21 March 1939, and the other ten on 11 April 1939. Three more were ordered on 4 September 1939 (see below) were intended to be of Type II, but were actually completed to the Type I design.

- Atherstone
  - Builder: Cammell Laird, Birkenhead
  - Laid down: 8 June 1939
  - Launched: 12 December 1939
  - Completed: 23 March 1940
  - Fate: Paid off October 1945 and broken up 25 November 1957.
- Berkeley
  - Builder: Cammell Laird, Birkenhead
  - Laid down: 8 June 1939
  - Launched: 29 January 1940
  - Completed: 6 June 1940
  - Fate: Bombed during the Dieppe Raid 19 August 1942.
- Cattistock
  - Builder: Yarrow, Scotstoun
  - Laid down: 9 June 1939
  - Launched: 22 February 1940
  - Completed: 22 July 1940
  - Fate: paid off 26 March 1946, and broken up 2 July 1957
- Cleveland
  - Builder: Yarrow, Scotstoun
  - Laid down: 7 July 1939
  - Launched: 24 April 1940
  - Completed: 18 September 1940
  - Fate: Paid off September 1945; sold to be broken up 1957, but wrecked en route to the scrap yard.
- Eglinton
  - Builder: Vickers-Armstrongs, Tyne
  - Laid down: 8 June 1939
  - Launched: 28 December 1939
  - Completed: 28 August 1940
  - Fate: Paid off 1945 and broken up 28 May 1956.
- Exmoor
  - Builder: Vickers-Armstrongs, Tyne
  - Laid down: 8 June 1939
  - Launched: 25 January 1940
  - Completed: 1 November 1940
  - Fate: sunk by E-boat S-30, off Lowestoft, 25 February 1941
- Fernie
  - Builder: John Brown & Company, Clydebank
  - Laid down: 8 June 1939
  - Launched: 9 January 1940
  - Completed: 29 May 1940
  - Fate: Aircraft target ship August 1945 to 1947. Paid off 1947, and broken up 7 November 1956.
- Garth
  - Builder: John Brown & Company, Clydebank
  - Laid down: 8 June 1939
  - Launched: 14 February 1940
  - Completed: 1 July 1940
  - Fate: Paid off December 1945 and broken up 15 August 1958.
- Hambledon
  - Builder: Swan Hunter, Wallsend
  - Laid down: 8 June 1939
  - Launched: 12 December 1939
  - Completed: 8 June 1940
  - Fate: Paid off December 1945 and broken up 4 February 1958.
- Holderness
  - Builder: Swan Hunter, Wallsend
  - Laid down: 29 June 1939
  - Launched: 8 February 1940
  - Completed: 10 August 1940
  - Fate: Paid off 20 May 1946 and broken up 20 November 1956.
- Cotswold
  - Builder: Yarrow, Scotstoun
  - Laid down: 11 October 1939
  - Launched: 18 July 1940
  - Completed: 16 November 1940
  - Fate: Paid off 29 June 1946 and broken up 11 September 1957.
- Cottesmore
  - Builder: Yarrow Shipbuilders, Scotstoun
  - Laid down: 12 December 1939
  - Launched: 5 September 1940
  - Completed: 29 December 1940
  - Fate: paid off 28 February 1946, sold to Egypt in 1950 as Ibrahim el Awal, renamed Mohamed Ali el Kebir in 1951, scrapped.

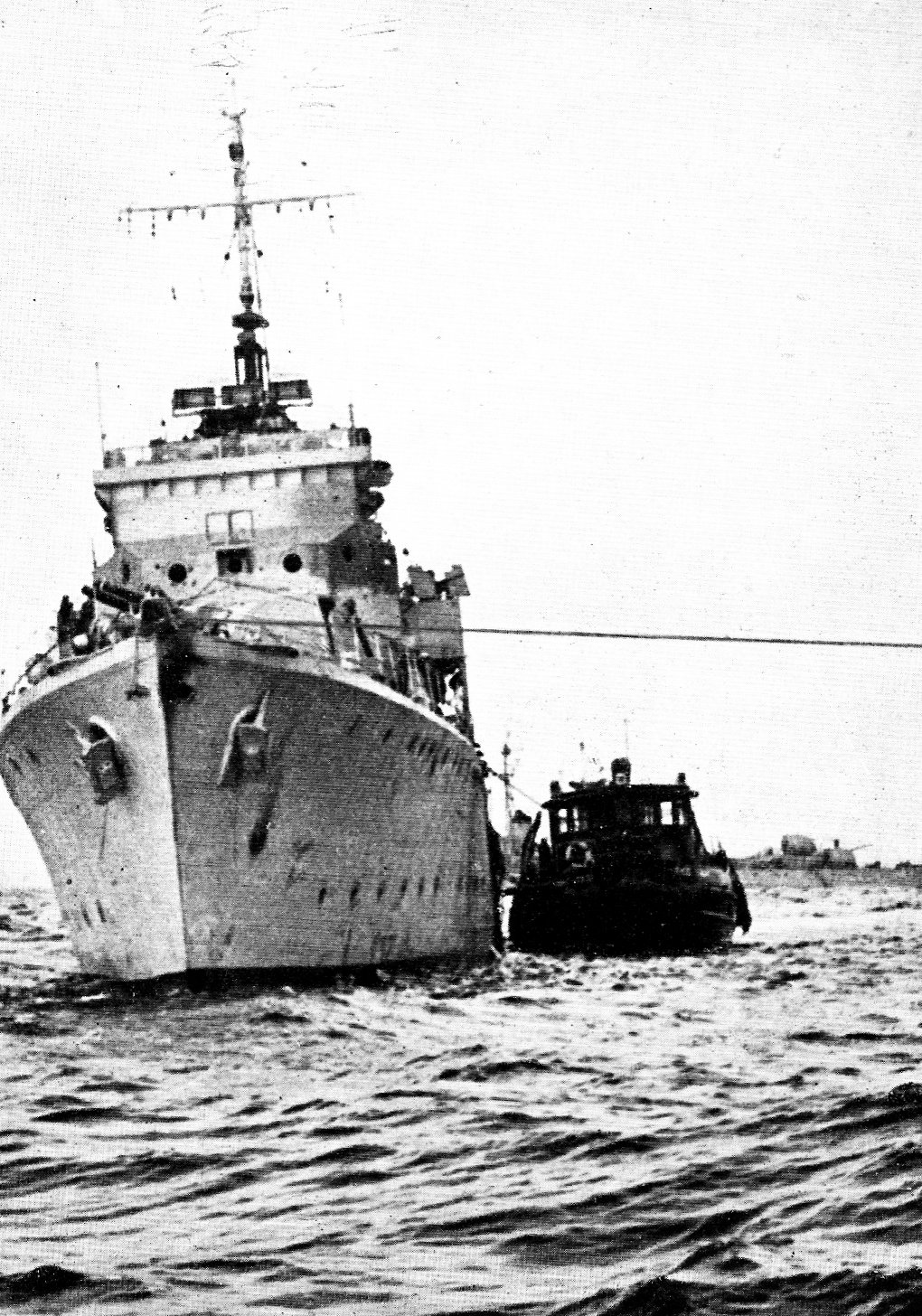
Ibrahim al-Awal, formerly Mendip, captured by Israel from Egypt in 1956

- Mendip
  - Builder: Swan Hunter, Wallsend
  - Laid down: 10 August 1939
  - Launched: 9 April 1940
  - Completed: 12 October 1940
  - Fate: paid off 20 May 1946, sold to Nationalist China 1947 and renamed Lin Fu. Seized prior to delivery and re-sold 1949 to Egypt as Mohamed Ali el Kebir, renamed Ibrahim el Awal in 1951, captured by Israel on 31 October 1956 and commissioned as INS Haifa (K-38), decommissioned 1968, used as training target and sunk by a Gabriel missile.
- Meynell
  - Builder: Swan Hunter, Wallsend
  - Laid down: 10 August 1939
  - Launched: 7 June 1940
  - Completed: 30 December 1940
  - Fate: Aircraft target ship 11 September 1945 to December 1946, when paid off. Sold to Ecuador 1954 and renamed Presidente Velasco Ibarra. 05/05/1978: Stricken and broken up.
- Pytchley
  - Builder: Scotts, Greenock
  - Laid down: 26 July 1939
  - Launched: 13 February 1940
  - Completed: 23 October 1940
  - Fate: Paid off August 1946 and broken up 1 December 1956.
- Quantock
  - Builder: Scotts, Greenock
  - Laid down: 26 July 1939
  - Launched: 22 April 1940
  - Completed: 6 February 1941
  - Fate: paid off December 1945, sold to Ecuador 1954 and renamed Presidente Alfaro.
- Quorn
  - Builder: J. Samuel White, Cowes
  - Laid down: 26 July 1939
  - Launched: 27 March 1940
  - Completed: 21 September 1940
  - Fate: sunk by a human torpedo off Normandy during the D-Day invasion, 2 August 1944
- Southdown
  - Builder: J. Samuel White, Cowes
  - Laid down: 22 August 1939
  - Launched: 5 July 1940
  - Completed: 8 November 1940
  - Fate: Aircraft target ship 8 September 1945 to 1946. Paid off 22 May 1946, and broken up 1 November 1956.
- Tynedale
  - Builder: Stephens, Linthouse
  - Laid down: 27 July 1939
  - Launched: 5 June 1940
  - Completed: 2 December 1940
  - Fate: Sunk by the German submarine U-593 on 12 December 1943.
- Whaddon
  - Builder: Stephens, Linthouse
  - Laid down: 27 July 1939
  - Launched: 16 July 1940
  - Completed: 28 February 1941
  - Fate: Paid off October 1945 and broken up 5 April 1959.

=== Type II ===
General characteristics Type II
- Displacement: 1,050 long tons (1,070 t) standard; 1,430 long tons (1,450 t) full load
- Length: 85.3 m (279 ft 10 in) o/a
- Beam: 9.6 m (31 ft 6 in)
- Draught: 2.51 m (8 ft 3 in)
- Propulsion: 2 Admiralty 3-drum boilers; 2 shaft Parsons geared turbines, 19,000 shp (14,200 kW)
- Speed: 27 kn (31 mph; 50 km/h); 25.5 kn (29.3 mph; 47.2 km/h) full
- Range: 3,600 nmi (6,700 km; 4,100 mi) at 14 kn (26 km/h; 16 mph)
- Complement: 164
- Armament: 6 × QF 4 in Mark XVI guns on twin mounts Mk. XIX; 4 × QF 2 pdr Mk. VIII on quad mount MK.VII; 2 × 20 mm Oerlikons on single mounts P Mk. III; 110 depth charges, 2 throwers, 3 racks

Eighteen were ordered on 4 September 1939 and two more (Lauderdale and Ledbury) on the following day. Three of these were completed with the same armament as the Type I – Blencathra, Brocklesby and Liddesdale. A final batch of sixteen was ordered on 20 December 1939.

- Avon Vale
  - Builder: John Brown & Company, Clydebank
  - Laid down: 12 February 1940
  - Launched: 23 October 1940
  - Completed: 17 February 1941
  - Fate: Paid off post-war; broken up at Sunderland, 15 May 1958
- Badsworth
  - Builder: Cammell Laird, Birkenhead
  - Laid down: 15 May 1940
  - Launched: 17 March 1941
  - Completed: 18 August 1941
  - Fate: Transferred to Royal Norwegian Navy as Arendal; scrapped 1965
- Beaufort
  - Builder: Cammell Laird, Birkenhead
  - Laid down: 17 July 1940
  - Launched: 9 June 1941
  - Completed: 3 November 1941
  - Fate: Sold to Royal Norwegian Navy in 1952 as HNoMS Haugesund; scrapped 1965
- Bedale
  - Builder: R. & W. Hawthorn, Leslie and Company, Hebburn-on-Tyne
  - Laid down: 25 May 1940
  - Launched: 23 July 1941
  - Completed: 9 May 1942
  - Fate: Loaned to Polish Navy as ORP Ślązak in 1942; returned 1946; sold to Indian Navy & commissioned as INS Godavari (D92) in 1953; scrapped 1979
- Bicester
  - Builder: R. & W. Hawthorn, Leslie and Company, Hebburn-on-Tyne
  - Laid down: 29 May 1940
  - Launched: 5 September 1941
  - Completed: 9 May 1942
  - Fate: Scrapped at Grays, 22 August 1956
- Blackmore
  - Builder: Alexander Stephen and Sons, Glasgow
  - Laid down: 10 February 1940
  - Launched: 2 December 1941
  - Completed: 14 April 1942
  - Fate: Transferred to Royal Danish Navy in 1954 as Esbern Snare (F341); scrapped 1966
- Blankney
  - Builder: John Brown & Company, Clydebank
  - Laid down: 17 May 1940
  - Launched: 19 December 1940
  - Completed: 11 April 1941
  - Fate: Scrapped 1957
- Blencathra
  - Builder: Cammell Laird, Birkenhead
  - Laid down: 18 November 1939
  - Launched: 6 August 1940
  - Completed: 14 December 1940
  - Fate: Scrapped at Barrow, 2 January 1957
- Bramham
  - Builder: Cammell Laird, Birkenhead
  - Laid down: 8 August 1940
  - Launched: 25 July 1941
  - Completed: 3 December 1941
  - Fate: Transferred to Royal Hellenic Navy as Themistocles in 1946; scrapped 1960
- Brocklesby
  - Builder: Cammell Laird, Birkenhead
  - Laid down: 14 August 1940
  - Launched: 30 December 1941
  - Completed: 3 April 1942
  - Fate: Sold for scrap 1968
- Calpe
  - Builder: Cammell Laird, Birkenhead
  - Laid down: 20 September 1940
  - Launched: 30 August 1941
  - Completed: 30 December 1941
  - Fate: Transferred to Royal Danish Navy in 1954 as Rolf Krake (F342); scrapped 1966
- Chiddingfold
  - Builder: John Brown & Company, Clydebank
  - Laid down: 15 July 1940
  - Launched: 19 August 1941
  - Completed: 22 November 1941
  - Fate: Sold to Indian Navy; commissioned as INS Ganga (D94) in 1953; scrapped circa 1975
- Cowdray
  - Builder: John Brown & Company, Clydebank
  - Laid down: 10 September 1940
  - Launched: 27 March 1942
  - Completed: 4 June 1942
  - Fate: Scrapped 1959
- Croome
  - Builder: Cammell Laird, Birkenhead
  - Laid down: 5 November 1940
  - Launched: 30 September 1941
  - Completed: 22 November 1941
  - Fate: Scrapped 1957
- Dulverton
  - Builder: Cammell Laird, Birkenhead
  - Laid down: 8 October 1940
  - Launched: 23 April 1941
  - Completed: 3 September 1941
  - Fate: Scuttled by HMS Belvoir after being hit by a Hs 293 glider bomb, 13 November 1943
- Eridge
  - Builder: Cammell Laird, Birkenhead
  - Laid down: 25 October 1940
  - Launched: 23 March 1941
  - Completed: 16 September 1941
  - Fate: Sold for scrap 1946
- Exmoor
  - Builder: John Brown & Company, Clydebank
  - Laid down: 6 August 1939
  - Launched: 20 February 1940
  - Completed: 20 June 1940
  - Fate: Transferred to Royal Danish Navy in 1954 as Valdemar Sejr (F343); scrapped 1966
- Farndale
  - Builder: John Brown & Company, Clydebank
  - Laid down: 28 September 1940
  - Launched: 11 April 1942
  - Completed: 12 September 1942
  - Fate: Scrapped at Blyth, 4 December 1962
- Grove
  - Builder: John Brown & Company, Clydebank
  - Laid down: 21 November 1940
  - Launched: 28 April 1942
  - Completed: 14 August 1942
  - Fate: Sunk by U-77, 12 June 1942
- Heythrop
  - Builder: John Brown & Company, Clydebank
  - Laid down: 10 January 1941
  - Launched: 30 September 1942
  - Completed: 23 January 1943
  - Fate: Sunk by U-652, 20 March 1942
- Hursley
  - Builder: John Brown & Company, Clydebank
  - Laid down: 25 February 1941
  - Launched: 10 October 1942
  - Completed: 15 February 1943
  - Fate: Transferred to Royal Hellenic Navy as Kriti
- Hurworth
  - Builder: R. & W. Hawthorn, Leslie and Company, Hebburn-on-Tyne
  - Laid down: 20 March 1940
  - Launched: 8 November 1940
  - Completed: 20 March 1941
  - Fate: Sank after hitting a mine, 22 October 1943
- Lamerton
  - Builder: R. & W. Hawthorn, Leslie and Company, Hebburn-on-Tyne
  - Laid down: 28 March 1941
  - Launched: 18 September 1942
  - Completed: 16 February 1943
  - Fate: Sold to Indian Navy; commissioned as INS Gomati (D93) in 1953
- Lauderdale
  - Builder: Alexander Stephen and Sons, Glasgow
  - Laid down: 14 April 1941
  - Launched: 12 November 1942
  - Completed: 8 March 1943
  - Fate: Loaned to Royal Hellenic Navy as Aigaion in 1946; discarded 1959
- Ledbury
  - Builder: Alexander Stephen and Sons, Glasgow
  - Laid down: 1 May 1941
  - Launched: 15 December 1942
  - Completed: 10 April 1943
  - Fate: Scrapped 1958
- Liddesdale
  - Builder: Vickers-Armstrongs, Tyne
  - Laid down: 10 May 1941
  - Launched: 20 March 1943
  - Completed: 7 August 1943
  - Fate: Broken up 1948
- Middleton
  - Builder: Cammell Laird, Birkenhead
  - Laid down: 3 June 1940
  - Launched: 16 March 1942
  - Completed: 8 August 1942
  - Fate: Scrapped 1958
- Oakley (i)
  - Builder: Cammell Laird, Birkenhead
  - Laid down: 15 June 1940
  - Launched: 21 May 1942
  - Completed: 15 August 1942
  - Fate: Transferred to Polish Navy as Kujawiak; sunk after hitting mine 16 June 1942
- Oakley (ii)
  - Builder: Cammell Laird, Birkenhead
  - Laid down: 20 July 1941 (as Tickham)
  - Launched: 14 June 1942
  - Completed: 10 November 1942
  - Fate: Sold to West Germany in 1958; served as Gneisenau; broken up 1972
- Puckeridge
  - Builder: Alexander Stephen and Sons, Glasgow
  - Laid down: 14 July 1941
  - Launched: 27 March 1943
  - Completed: 3 August 1943
  - Fate: Sunk by U-boat U-617, 6 September 1943

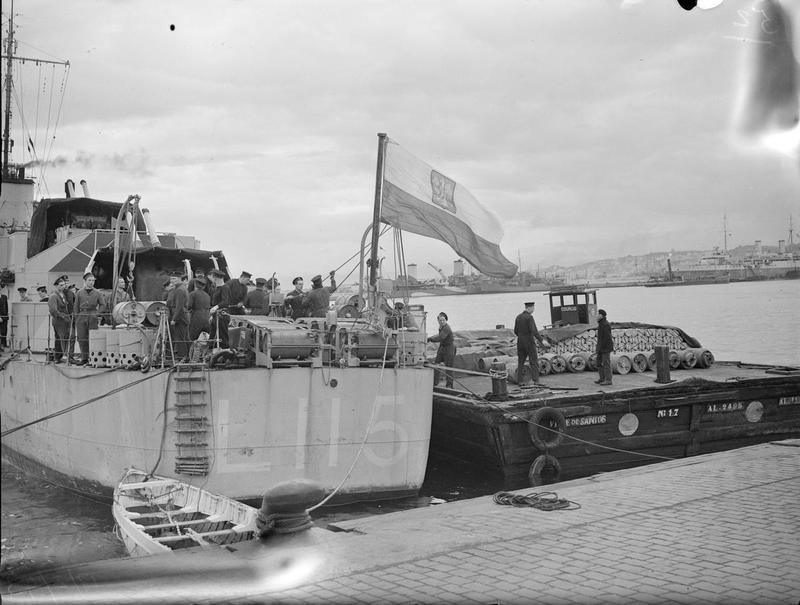
ORP Krakowiak (L115)

- Silverton
  - Builder: John Brown & Company, Clydebank
  - Laid down: 15 August 1941
  - Launched: 18 June 1943
  - Completed: 14 September 1943
  - Fate: Transferred to Polish Navy as Krakowiak
- Southwold
  - Builder: John Brown & Company, Clydebank
  - Laid down: 10 March 1939
  - Launched: 17 October 1939
  - Completed: 20 January 1940
  - Fate: Sunk by a mine, 24 March 1942
- Tetcott
  - Builder: Alexander Stephen and Sons, Glasgow
  - Laid down: 12 August 1941
  - Launched: 23 July 1943
  - Completed: 20 November 1943
  - Fate: Scrapped 1957
- Wheatland
  - Builder: Alexander Stephen and Sons, Glasgow
  - Laid down: 28 August 1941
  - Launched: 5 August 1943
  - Completed: 12 November 1943
  - Fate: Scrapped 1959
- Wilton
  - Builder: Yarrow Shipbuilders, Scotstoun
  - Laid down: 18 September 1941
  - Launched: 21 October 1943
  - Completed: 1 February 1944
  - Fate: Scrapped 1958
- Zetland
  - Builder: Alexander Stephen and Sons, Glasgow
  - Laid down: 30 July 1940
  - Launched: 23 March 1942
  - Completed: 29 July 1942
  - Fate: Loaned to Norway 1952; sold to Norway 1956; scrapped 1965

=== Type III ===
General characteristics Type III
- Displacement: 1,050 long tons (1,070 t) standard; 1,435 long tons (1,458 t) full load
- Length: 85.3 m (279 ft 10 in) o/a
- Beam: 10.16 m (33 ft 4 in)
- Draught: 3.51 m (11 ft 6 in)
- Propulsion: 2 Admiralty 3-drum boilers; 2 shaft Parsons geared turbines, 19,000 shp (14,000 kW)
- Speed: 27 kn (31 mph; 50 km/h); 25.5 kn (29.3 mph; 47.2 km/h) full
- Range: 2,350 nmi (4,350 km) at 20 kn (37 km/h)
- Complement: 168
- Armament: 4 × QF 4 in Mark XVI guns on twin mounts Mk. XIX; 4 × QF 2 pdr Mk. VIII on quad mount MK.VII; 2 × 20 mm Oerlikons on single mounts P Mk. III; 2 × 21 in (533 mm) torpedo tubes; 110 depth charges, 4 throwers, 3 racks
- Notes: cost £352,000

- Airedale
  - Builder: Builder: John Brown & Company, Clydebank
  - Laid down: 27 November 1939
  - Launched: 17 July 1940
  - Completed: 9 December 1940
  - Fate: Lost 30 June 1942 after aerial attack
- Albrighton
  - Builder: Builder: John Brown & Company, Clydebank
  - Laid down: 8 January 1940
  - Launched: 17 August 1940
  - Completed: 4 January 1941
  - Fate: Transferred to Federal German Navy in 1959 as Raule, scrapped in Hamburg in 1969
- Aldenham
  - Builder: Cammell Laird, Birkenhead
  - Laid down: 7 March 1941
  - Launched: 20 November 1941
  - Completed: 29 March 1942
  - Fate: Mined and lost 12 December 1944
- Belvoir
  - Builder: Cammell Laird, Birkenhead
  - Laid down: 2 April 1941
  - Launched: 18 December 1941
  - Completed: 5 May 1942
  - Fate: Scrapped at Borrowstounness ("Bo'ness") October 1957
- Blean
  - Builder: Hawthorn Leslie, Hebburn
  - Laid down: 24 May 1941
  - Launched: 28 January 1942
  - Completed: 26 May 1942
  - Fate: Lost 30 December 1942, torpedoed by U-443
- Bleasdale
  - Builder: Vickers-Armstrongs, Barrow-in-Furness
  - Laid down: 16 July 1941
  - Launched: 27 February 1942
  - Completed: 3 June 1942
  - Fate: Scrapped at Blyth in September 1956
- Bolebroke
  - Builder: Swan Hunter, Wallsend
  - Laid down: 16 December 1941
  - Launched: 28 September 1942
  - Completed: 9 March 1943
  - Fate: Transferred to Greece as Pindos scrapped in 1960
- Border
  - Builder: Swan Hunter, Wallsend
  - Laid down: 9 January 1942
  - Launched: 1 October 1942
  - Completed: 19 March 1943
  - Fate: Transferred to Greece as Adrias, written off after mine damage October 1943
- Catterick
  - Builder: Vickers-Armstrongs, Barrow-in-Furness
  - Laid down: 15 September 1942
  - Launched: 21 May 1943
  - Completed: 26 July 1943
  - Fate: Bought by Greece in 1946 as Hastings, scrapped at Piraeus June 1963
- Derwent
  - Builder: Vickers-Armstrongs, Barrow-in-Furness
  - Laid down: 5 October 1942
  - Launched: 19 June 1943
  - Completed: 3 August 1943
  - Fate: Torpedoed by aircraft and written off March 1943
- Easton
  - Builder: J. Samuel White, Cowes
  - Laid down: 15 March 1940
  - Launched: 14 June 1941
  - Completed: 3 September 1941
  - Fate: Scrapped at Rosyth in January 1953
- Eggesford
  - Builder: J. Samuel White, Cowes
  - Laid down: 1 May 1940
  - Launched: 21 February 1941
  - Completed: 15 June 1941
  - Fate: Sold to Federal German Navy in 1959 as Brommy, scrapped in 1969

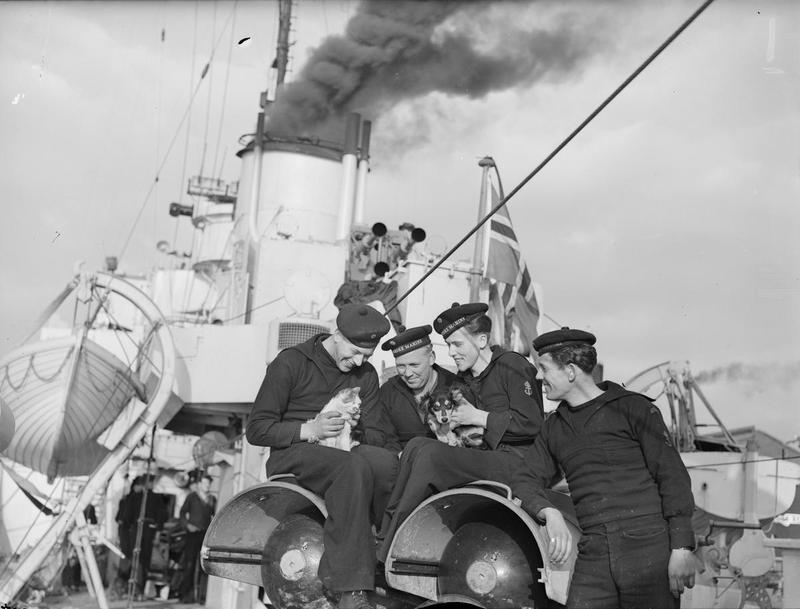
Eskdale - Hunt Class Destroyer Loaned To the Norwegian Navy

- Eskdale
  - Builder: Cammell Laird, Birkenhead
  - Laid down: 17 June 1940
  - Launched: 20 February 1941
  - Completed: 15 June 1941
  - Fate: Transferred to Royal Norwegian Navy, torpedoed by S 65 or S 112 on 13–14 April 1943
- Glaisdale
  - Builder: Cammell Laird, Birkenhead
  - Laid down: 2 September 1940
  - Launched: 23 June 1941
  - Completed: 7 October 1941
  - Fate: Transferred to Royal Norwegian Navy; bought by Norway in 1946 as Narvik, scrapped in 1963
- Goathland
  - Builder: Fairfield, Govan
  - Laid down: 12 June 1940
  - Launched: 9 May 1941
  - Completed: 12 September 1941
  - Fate: Lost after mine damage in July 1944
- Haldon
  - Builder: Fairfield, Govan
  - Laid down: 25 May 1940
  - Launched: 13 March 1941
  - Completed: 3 June 1941
  - Fate: Transferred to Free French Navy as La Combattante, lost to mine February 1945
- Hatherleigh
  - Builder: Vickers-Armstrongs, Barrow-in-Furness
  - Laid down: 22 August 1940
  - Launched: 15 May 1941
  - Completed: 25 September 1941
  - Fate: Transferred to Greece as Kanaris, returned to the Royal Navy and scrapped in 1960
- Haydon
  - Builder: Vickers-Armstrongs, Barrow-in-Furness
  - Laid down: 10 November 1941
  - Launched: 20 July 1942
  - Completed: 20 December 1942
  - Fate: Scrapped at Dunston-on-Tyne, May 1958
- Holcombe
  - Builder: Stephens, Linthouse
  - Laid down: 15 September 1940
  - Launched: 20 May 1941
  - Completed: 9 October 1941
  - Fate: Torpedoed by U-593 on 12 December 1943
- Limbourne
  - Builder: Stephens, Linthouse
  - Laid down: 25 September 1940
  - Launched: 30 May 1941
  - Completed: 22 October 1941
  - Fate: Torpedoed by German torpedo boat T22 on 22 October 1943
- Melbreak
  - Builder: Swan Hunter, Wallsend
  - Laid down: 2 December 1941
  - Launched: 9 September 1942
  - Completed: 1 February 1943
  - Fate: Scrapped at Grays, November 1956
- Modbury
  - Builder: Swan Hunter, Wallsend
  - Laid down: 28 January 1942
  - Launched: 11 October 1942
  - Completed: 21 February 1943
  - Fate: Transferred to Greece as Miaoulis returned to the Royal Navy and scrapped in 1960
- Penylan
  - Builder: Vickers-Armstrongs, Barrow-in-Furness
  - Laid down: 7 January 1942
  - Launched: 27 August 1942
  - Completed: 11 December 1942
  - Fate: Torpedoed by S 115 on 3 December 1942
- Rockwood
  - Builder: Vickers-Armstrongs, Barrow-in-Furness
  - Laid down: 14 August 1940
  - Launched: 10 April 1941
  - Completed: 3 August 1941
  - Fate: Written off after hit by Henschel Hs 293 glider bomb in November 1943
- Stevenstone
  - Builder: J. Samuel White, Cowes
  - Laid down: 6 June 1940
  - Launched: 18 March 1941
  - Completed: 14 June 1941
  - Fate: Scrapped at Dunston, September 1959
- Talybont
  - Builder: J. Samuel White, Cowes
  - Laid down: 9 June 1941
  - Launched: 25 March 1943
  - Completed: 4 November 1943
  - Fate: Sold for scrapping in 1961
- Tanatside
  - Builder: Yarrow Shipbuilders, Scotland
  - Laid down: 4 February 1942
  - Launched: 7 November 1942
  - Completed: 20 April 1943
  - Fate: Bought by Greece in 1946 as Adrias, scrapped in 1964
- Wensleydale
  - Builder: Yarrow Shipbuilders, Scotland
  - Laid down: 21 February 1942
  - Launched: 5 December 1942
  - Completed: 18 May 1943
  - Fate: Written off after collision November 1944

=== Type IV ===
General characteristics Type IV
- Displacement: 1,175 long tons (1,194 t) standard; 1,561 long tons (1,586 t) full load
- Length: 90.22 m (296 ft 0 in) o/a
- Beam: 9.6 m (31 ft 6 in)
- Draught: 3.51 m (11 ft 6 in)
- Propulsion: 2 Admiralty 3-drum boilers; 2 shaft Parsons geared turbines, 19,000 shp (14,000 kW)
- Speed: 26 kn (30 mph; 48 km/h); 25.5 kn (29.3 mph; 47.2 km/h) full
- Range: 950 nmi (1,760 km) at 25 kn (46 km/h) (Brecon); 1,175 nmi (2,176 km) at 25 kn (46 km/h) (Brissinden)
- Complement: 170
- Armament: 6 × QF 4 in Mark XVI guns on twin mounts Mk. XIX; 4 × QF 2 pdr Mk. VIII on quad mount MK.VII; 2 × 20 mm Oerlikons on single mounts P Mk. III; 4 × 0.5 in Vickers machine guns on twin mounts Mk. V, later replaced by 4 × 20 mm Oerlikons on twin mounts Mk. V; 3 × 21 in (533 mm) torpedo tubes; 40 depth charges, 2 throwers, 1 rack

These very distinct vessels were built to a radically different private design by Thornycroft at Southampton, ordered on 28 July 1940.

- Brecon
  - Laid down: 27 February 1941
  - Launched: 27 June 1942
  - Completed: 18 December 1942
  - Fate: Paid off 4 December 1945 and broken up on 17 September 1962 at Faslane.
- Brissenden
  - Laid down: 28 February 1941
  - Launched: 15 September 1942
  - Completed: 12 February 1943
  - Fate: Paid off 19 June 1948 and broken up on 3 March 1965 at Dalmuir.

== Bibliography ==
- Brown, David (1995) [1990]. Warship Losses of World War Two (2nd rev. ed.). Arms and Armour Press. ISBN 978-1-85409-278-6.
- Brown, David K. (2000). Nelson to Vanguard: Warship Design and Development, 1923–1945. London: Chatham Publishing. ISBN 1-86176-136-8.
- Campbell, N. J. M. (1980). "Great Britain (including Empire Forces)". In Chesneau, Roger (ed.). Conway's All the World's Fighting Ships 1922–1946. Conway Maritime Press. pp. 2–85. ISBN 0-85177-146-7.
- Colledge, J. J.; Warlow, Ben (2006) [1969]. Ships of the Royal Navy: The Complete Record of All Fighting Ships of the Royal Navy from the 15th Century to the Present (3rd Rev ed.). London: Chatham Publishing. ISBN 978-1-86176-281-8. OCLC 67375475.
- Critchley, Mike (1982). British Warships Since 1945: Part 3, Destroyers. Maritime Books. ISBN 0-9506323-9-2.
- Evans, Arthur S. (2010). Destroyer Down: An Account of HM Destroyer Losses 1939–1945. Pen & Sword Maritime. ISBN 978-1-84884-270-0.
- Friedman, Norman (2008). British Destroyers & Frigates: The Second World War and After. Seaforth Publishing. ISBN 978-1-84832-015-4.
- Winser, John de D. (1999). B.E.F. Ships Before, at and After Dunkirk. World Ship Society. ISBN 0-905617-91-6.
