= ORP Ślązak (L26) =

Hunt-class destroyer in service with the Polish Navy

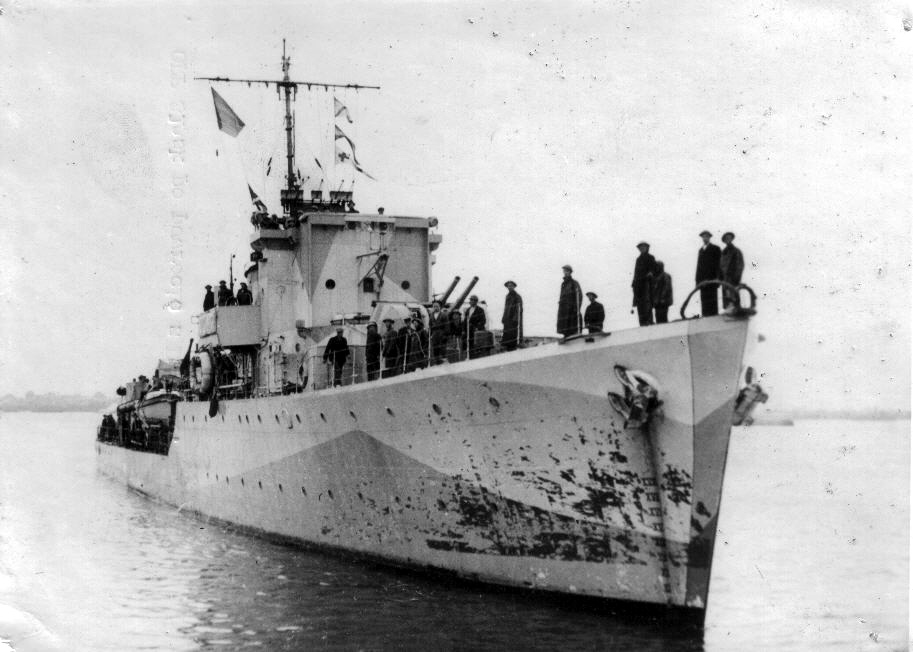
- Ślązak returning home after the Dieppe Raid

History

United Kingdom
- Name: HMS Bedale
- Builder: Hawthorn Leslie, Newcastle
- Laid down: 25 May 1940
- Launched: 23 July 1941
- Fate: Transferred to Poland 1942, returned 1946, transferred to India 1953

Poland
- Name: ORP Ślązak
- Commissioned: 17 April 1942
- Decommissioned: 28 September 1946
- Identification: Pennant number: L26
- Fate: Returned to Royal Navy 1946

India
- Name: INS Godavari
- Namesake: Godavari River
- Acquired: April 1959
- Commissioned: 27 April 1953
- Out of service: 1976, after running ashore in the Maldives
- Identification: Pennant number: D92
- Fate: Scrapped in 1979

General characteristics
- Class & type: Hunt-class destroyer
- Displacement: 1050 tons standard; 1490 tons full load
- Length: 85.3 m (280 ft)
- Beam: 9.6 m (31 ft)
- Draught: 2.4 m (7 ft 10 in)/3.9 m (13 ft)
- Installed power: 19,000 hp (14,200 kW)
- Propulsion: 2 shaft steam turbines
- Speed: 27 kn (50 km/h; 31 mph)
- Range: 2,500 nmi (4,600 km; 2,900 mi) at 20 kn (37 km/h; 23 mph); 3,700 nmi (6,900 km; 4,300 mi) at 14 kn (26 km/h; 16 mph)
- Complement: 160
- Armament: 6 × 102 mm QF 4 inch Mk XVI naval guns (3 twin turrets); 4 × 40 mm pom-pom cannons; 2 to 4 20 mm Anti-Aircraft cannons; 2 depth charge launchers; 4 depth charge throwers

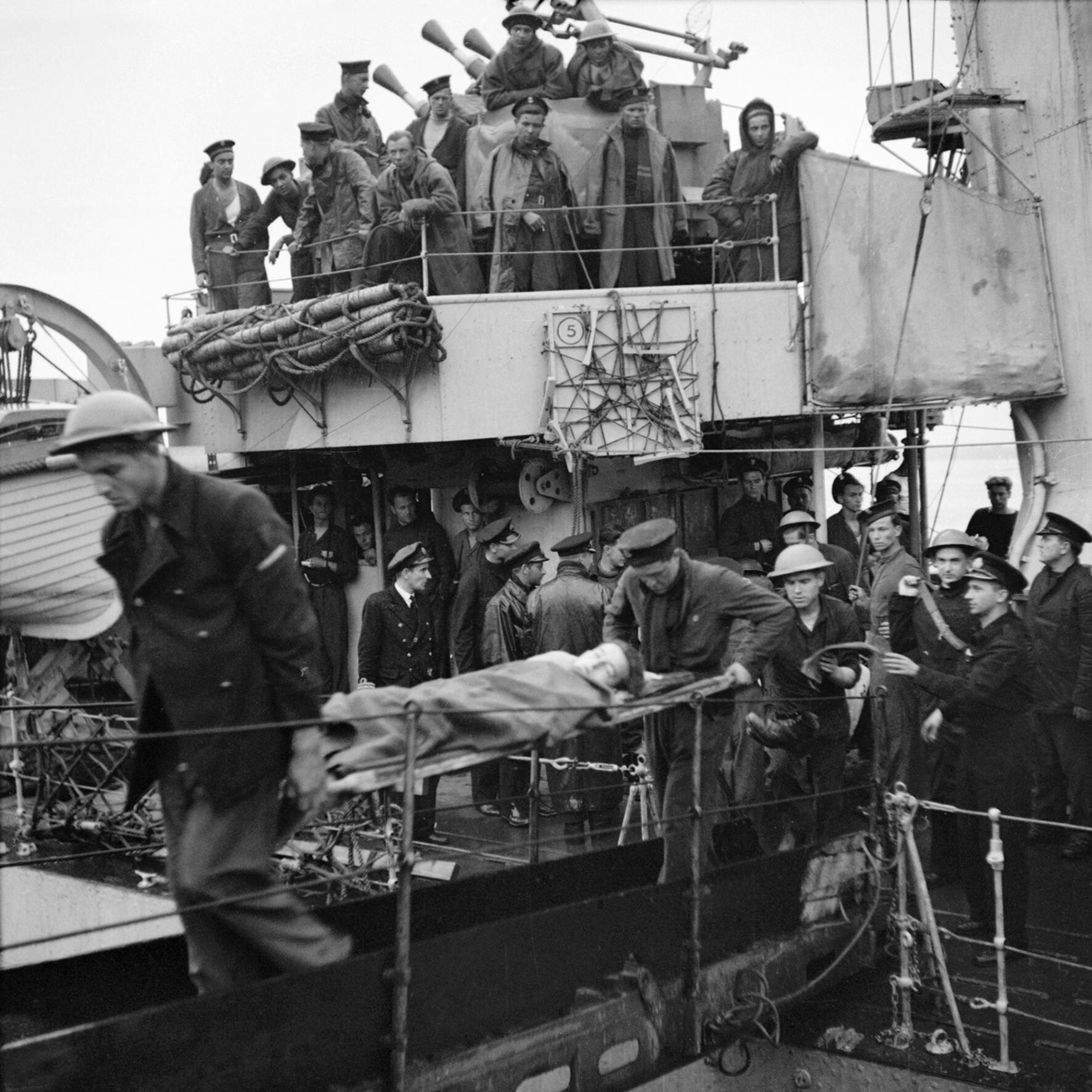
Wounded soldiers evacuated from Ślązak after the Dieppe Raid

ORP Ślązak (Polish for Silesian) was a World War II Hunt-class destroyer. Initially laid down in 1940 for the Royal Navy as HMS Bedale, in 1942 she was commissioned by the Polish Navy in the West.

After World War II, she was leased to the Indian Navy in 1953, where she served as a training ship until 1976. She was scrapped in 1979.

== History as ORP Ślązak ==
Ślazak was commissioned on 17 April 1942. During the Second World War she took part in 32 patrols and escorted 104 convoys. Ślązak was one of eight Hunt-class ships that took part in the Dieppe Raid. At Dieppe she saved 85 soldiers of the Royal Regiment of Canada, trapped at the beach after landing. During the invasion of Normandy she was supporting the landing at Sword. She was the lead destroyer for the lead flotilla of minesweepers that morning, which was symbolic because the invasion of Poland by German forces had initiated the conflict. As a convoy escort her crew shot down five enemy aircraft (and possibly three more).

After the war she was decommissioned in 1946 and transferred back to the Royal Navy.

== History as INS Godavari ==
HMS Bedale was leased to the Indian Navy in 1952. She underwent a refit by the Cammell Laird shipyard at Birkenhead, and was commissioned as INS Godavari on 27 April 1953. In April 1959, the lease was converted into a sale. Along with INS Gomati and INS Ganga she formed part of the 22nd Destroyer squadron.

She served as a training ship until 23 March 1976 when she ran aground in the Maldives and was damaged beyond repair. INS Godavari was eventually scrapped in 1979.

== Publications ==
- Borowiak, Mariusz (2018). Hunt-class Destroyers in Polish Navy Service. Kagero Publishing. ISBN 978-83-66148-10-9.
- Colledge, J. J.; Warlow, Ben & Bush, Steve (2020). Ships of the Royal Navy: The Complete Record of all Fighting Ships of the Royal Navy from the 15th Century to the Present (5th revised and updated ed.). Seaforth Publishing. ISBN 978-1-5267-9327-0.
- English, John (1987). The Hunts: A History of the Design, Development and Careers of the 86 Destroyers of This Class Built for the Royal and Allied Navies during World War II. World Ship Society. ISBN 0-905617-44-4.
- Friedman, Norman (2008). British Destroyers & Frigates: The Second World War and After. Seaforth Publishing. ISBN 978-1-84832-015-4.
- Lenton, H. T. (1998). British & Empire Warships of the Second World War. Naval Institute Press. ISBN 1-55750-048-7.
- Whitley, M. J. (2000). Destroyers of World War Two: An International Encyclopedia. Cassell & Co. ISBN 1-85409-521-8.
