= HMS Bleasdale =

Destroyer of the Royal Navy

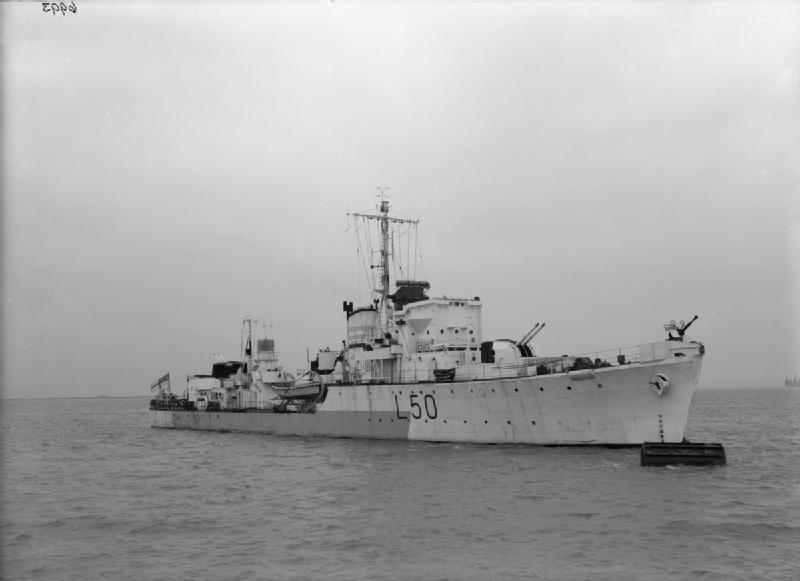
- Bleasdale on the Medway, c1943 (IWM)

History

United Kingdom
- Name: HMS Bleasdale
- Ordered: 19 July 1940
- Builder: Vickers-Armstrongs, Newcastle
- Laid down: 31 October 1940
- Launched: 23 July 1941
- Completed: 16 April 1942
- Identification: Pennant number L50
- Honours and awards: English Channel 1942-44; Dieppe 1942; North Sea 1943–45; Normandy 1944; Atlantic 1944
- Fate: Scrapped in 1956
- Badge: On a Field Red, a hunting horn and crozier in saltire, both Gold.

General characteristics
- Class & type: Hunt-class destroyer
- Displacement: 1,050 long tons (1,070 t) standard; 1,435 long tons (1,458 t) full load
- Length: 85.3 m (279 ft 10 in) o/a
- Beam: 10.16 m (33 ft 4 in)
- Draught: 3.51 m (11 ft 6 in)
- Propulsion: 2 Admiralty 3-drum boilers; 2 shaft Parsons geared turbines, 19,000 shp (14,000 kW)
- Speed: 27 knots (31 mph; 50 km/h); 25.5 kn (29.3 mph; 47.2 km/h) full
- Range: 2,350 nmi (4,350 km) at 20 kn (37 km/h)
- Complement: 168
- Armament: 4 × QF 4-inch (102 mm) Mark XVI guns on twin mounts Mk. XIX; 4 × QF 2-pounder (40 mm) Mk. VIII AA guns on quad mount MK.VII; 2 × 20 mm Oerlikon AA guns on single mounts P Mk. III; 2 × 21-inch (533 mm) torpedo tubes; 110 depth charges, 4 throwers, 3 racks

HMS Bleasdale was a Hunt-class destroyer of the Royal Navy. She was a member of the third subgroup of the class, and saw service in the Second World War. All the ships of this class were named after British fox hunts. She was the first Royal Navy warship with this name, after the Bleasdale hunt in Lancashire. In 1942 she was adopted by the civil community of Garstang in Lancashire, as part of Warship Week.

== Service history ==
On commissioning Bleasdale served in the English Channel. In 1942 she was allocated as part of the Naval escort force for the unsuccessful Dieppe Raid in July 1942. In 1943 she remained in the English Channel. In 1944 she served mostly in the English Channel and was part of the escort force for the assault and landings in Normandy, as part of the D-Day operations. She provided gunfire support on Juno Beach.

In 1945 she was nominated for service in the Far East and underwent refit before passage. She was at Port Swetteneham in the Far East when the Japanese surrender was signed. She returned to the UK and was paid off at Chatham and placed in reserve on 16 November 1945.

In February 1946 she was recommissioned for the Nore Local Flotilla and the following year too part in Operation 'Big Bang' for the demilitarization of German defences at Heligoland. On 21 April 1952 she was again placed into reserve at Sheerness.

She was subsequently placed on the disposal list sold for scrap to Hughes Bolckow. She arrived at their ship breaking yard at Blyth on 14 September 1956.

== Sources ==
- Colledge, J. J. & Warlow, Ben, Ships of the Royal Navy: The Complete Record of all Fighting Ships of the Royal Navy from the 15th Century to the Present, Newbury, 2010
- English, John, The Hunts – A history of the design, development and careers of the 86 destroyers of this class built for the Royal and Allied Navies during World War II, Cumbria, 1987 (World Ship Society)
- Whitley, M. J., Destroyers of World War Two – an international encyclopedia, London, 1988
- Gardiner, Robert (ed.), Conway's All the World's Fighting Ships 1922–1946, London, 1987
