= 365th Infantry Division =

- 365. Infanterie-Division
- Active: 10 March 1940 – 1 August 1940
- Country: Nazi Germany
- Branch: Army (Wehrmacht)
- Type: Infantry
- Size: Division
- Engagements: None

The 365th Infantry Division (German: 365. Infanterie-Division) was an infantry division of the Heer, the ground forces of Nazi Germany, during World War II. It was active between March and August 1940.

== History ==
The 365th Infantry Division was formed on 10 March 1940 as a Landesschützen division of the ninth wave of deployment. Its staff personnel was drawn from the Oberfeldkommandantur Tarnow (which had in turn been formed on 14 October 1939 from the Feldkommandanturen 570 and 647). The division initially consisted of three infantry regiments, numbered 647, 648 and 649; Infantry Regiment 648 was initially staffed with only two battalions whereas the other two regiments had three each, for a total of eight battalions in the divisions. Additionally, the 365th Infantry Division commanded an artillery battery, a bicycle squadron and a signals company.

On 15 June 1940, Infantry Regiment 648 belatedly received a third battalion, bringing the division to a regular nine battalions of strength. On 24 June, the division was tasked to start the assembly of a dedicated artillery regiment (named Artillery Regiment 365), but this assembly was interrupted when the division itself was dissolved on 1 August 1940. The divisional staff went on to later form the Oberfeldkommandantur 365 in Lviv (German-occupied Ukraine), whereas the regiments were shuffled to Ulm for purposes of further usages. There, the personnel of the former 365th Infantry Division formed seven independent home guard battalions (German: Heimat-Wach-Bataillone) to guard prisoners of war. On 1 January 1941, these battalions became the Landesschützen battalions 414, 416, and 432 through 438.

The division was commanded throughout its entire tenure of service by Konrad Haase, who later went on to achieve notoriety during his service with 302nd Infantry Division as the German commander during the ill-fated Allied Dieppe Raid in 1942.
