= Operation Jubilee order of battle =

Military units that participated in the 1942 Dieppe raid

Operation Jubilee was the Allied code name for the raid at Dieppe on the French coast on August 19, 1942. The following order of battle lists the significant military units that participated in the battle, or were available as reserve.

== Allied ==
=== Ground forces ===
The landing force commander was Major-General John Roberts, the commander of the 2nd Canadian Infantry Division.

- 2nd Canadian Infantry Division
  - 4th Canadian Infantry Brigade - Brigadier Sherwood Lett
    - The Essex Scottish Regiment
    - The Royal Hamilton Light Infantry
    - The Royal Regiment of Canada
  - 5th Canadian Infantry Brigade
    - Three platoons of The Black Watch (Royal Highland Regiment) of Canada
    - Mortar Platoon of The Calgary Highlanders (Note: Did not disembark; served as anti-aircraft gunners on LCT; two sergeants shot down a German aircraft, earning Mentions in Despatches)
  - 6th Canadian Infantry Brigade - Brigadier William Southam
    - Les Fusiliers Mont-Royal (Floating reserve)
    - The Queen's Own Cameron Highlanders of Canada
    - The South Saskatchewan Regiment
    - No. 6 Defence Platoon (Lorne Scots)
  - 14th Army Tank Regiment (The Calgary Regiment [Tank])
  - Detachment of 3rd Light Anti-Aircraft Regiment, Royal Canadian Artillery (RCA)
  - Detachment of 4th Field Regiment, RCA
  - The Toronto Scottish Regiment (Machine Gun)
- No. 3 Commando (British Army), John Durnford-Slater
- No. 4 Commando (British Army), Lt-Col Simon Fraser, 15th Lord Lovat
- No. 10 Inter-Allied Commando (French speakers attached to other units.as interpreters)
- The Royal Marines Commando
- No. 30 Commando (intelligence gathering)

In addition a detachment of the 1st U.S. Ranger Battalion was assigned as observers to various units

=== Naval forces ===
The naval forces were under the command of Captain John Hughes-Hallett RN.

Eight Hunt-class destroyers:

- Albrighton
- Berkeley- support to Calpe, controlled low fighter cover squadrons under Acting Squadron Leader, J. H. Scott, also "First Rescue Ship"
- Bleasdale
- Brocklesby
- Calpe - Headquarters ship
- Fernie - reserve HQ ship
- Garth
- ORP Ślązak (Polish Navy)
- HMS Locust - gun boat, "Cutting Out Force" carrying RM Commandos
- 9th Minesweeper Flotilla
- 13th Minesweeper Flotilla
- Nine landing ships, infantry each with a number of landing craft
  - HMS Duke of Wellington "Landing Ship, Infantry (Hand-Hoisting)",
  - HMS Glengyle - Landing Ship, Infantry (Large)
  - HMS Invicta - Landing ship, Infantry (Small)
  - HMS Prince Charles
  - HMS Prince Leopold
  - HMS Princess Beatrix - Landing Ship, Infantry (Medium)
  - HMS Princess Astrid
  - HMS Prins Albert
  - HMS Queen Emma

Supporting elements came from Royal Navy Coastal Forces

- 12 Motor Gun Boats
- 4 Steam Gun Boats of the 1st SGB Flotilla.
- 20 Motor Launches

=== Air forces ===
The Allied air forces were under the command of Air Vice Marshal Trafford Leigh-Mallory. The Deputy Senior Air Staff Officer in the group, Group Captain Harry Broadhurst flew "air observation" at Dieppe.

- 11 Group RAF Fighter Command
  - 48 Spitfire squadrons
    - No. 19 Squadron RAF
    - No. 41 Squadron RAF
    - No. 43 Squadron RAF
    - No. 64 Squadron RAF, Spitfire IX, Hornchurch
    - No. 66 Squadron RAF
    - No. 71 Squadron RAF (one of the three "Eagle Squadrons" flown by Americans in the RAF), RAF Gravesend
    - No. 81 Squadron RAF
    - No. 87 Squadron RAF
    - No. 91 Squadron RAF
    - No. 111 Squadron RAF
    - No. 121 (Eagle) Squadron RAF RAF Southend
    - No. 122 Squadron RAF, Hornchurch
    - No. 124 Squadron RAF, Spitfire HF VI
    - No. 129 Squadron RAF
    - No. 130 Squadron RAF
    - No. 131 Squadron RAF
    - No. 133 (Eagle) Squadron RAF Lympne
    - No. 134 Squadron RAF
    - No. 154 Squadron RAF
    - No. 165 Squadron RAF
    - No. 222 Squadron RAF
    - No. 232 Squadron RAF
    - No. 242 Squadron RAF
    - 302 "City of Poznań" Polish Fighter Squadron
    - 303 "Kościuszko" Polish Fighter Squadron
    - 306 "City of Toruń" Polish Fighter Squadron
    - 308 "City of Kraków" Polish Fighter Squadron
    - No. 310 (Czechoslovak) Squadron, Spitfire Vb
    - No. 312 (Czechoslovak) Squadron, Spitfire Vb
    - 317 "City of Wilno" Polish Fighter Squadron, Spitfire Vb
    - No. 331 (Norwegian) Squadron, Spitfire Vb
    - No. 332 (Norwegian) Squadron, Spitfire Vb
    - No. 340 (GC/IV/2 Ile de France) Squadron (French), Spitfire Vb, Hornchurch
    - No. 350 (Belgian) Squadron (Belgian), Spitfire Vb
    - No. 401 Squadron RCAF, Lympne
    - No. 403 Squadron RCAF
    - No. 411 Squadron RCAF
    - No. 412 Squadron RCAF
    - No. 416 Squadron RCAF
    - No. 501 Squadron RAF
    - No. 602 Squadron RAF
    - No. 610 Squadron RAF
    - No. 611 Squadron RAF
    - No. 616 Squadron RAF
  - Eight squadrons for ground attack
    - No. 3 Squadron RAF Hurricane IIC
    - No. 32 Squadron RAF Hurricane IIB, IIC, S/L Thorn
    - No. 43 Squadron RAF Hurricane, RAF Tangmere, S/L Danny Le Roy du Vivier (Belgian)
    - No. 87 Squadron RAF Hurricane
    - No. 174 Squadron RAF Hurricane
    - No. 175 Squadron RAF Hurricane
    - No. 245 Squadron RAF Hurricane
    - No. 253 Squadron RAF Hurricane
  - Three Hawker Typhoon squadrons
    - No. 56 Squadron RAF
    - No. 266 Squadron RAF Typhoon IB, West Malling
    - No. 609 Squadron RAF Typhoon IB, West Malling
- RAF Army Cooperation Command, No. 35 Wing
  - No. 26 Squadron RAF - Mustang I, RAF Gatwick
  - No. 239 Squadron RAF - Mustang I
  - No. 400 Squadron RCAF - Mustang I, W/Cdr Waddell
  - No. 414 Squadron RCAF -Mustang I, W/Cdr Begg
- RAF Army Cooperation Command, No. 36 Wing
  - No. 13 Squadron RAF Bristol Blenheim light bomber (laying smoke)
- RAF Army Cooperation Command, No. 32 Wing
  - No. 614 Squadron RAF Bristol Blenheim light bomber (laying smoke)
- A squadron with Bristol Beaufighter
- No 418 (City of Edmonton) Squadron RCAF Douglas Boston
- No. 2 Group RAF (RAF Bomber Command)
  - No. 88 Squadron RAF Boston III, RAF Ford (tactical bombing)
  - No. 107 Squadron RAF Boston III, RAF Ford (tactical bombing)
  - No. 226 Squadron RAF Boston III, RAF Thruxton. (laying smoke)
- USAAF Eighth Air Force
  - 97th Bombardment Group (B-17Es), Grafton Underwood
    - 340th Bombardment Squadron
    - 341st Bombardment Squadron
    - 342nd Bombardment Squadron
    - 414th Bombardment Squadron
  - 31st Fighter Group (Spitfires)
    - 307th Fighter Squadron
    - 308th Fighter Squadron
    - 309th Fighter Squadron

The RAF Air Sea Rescue Service also operated some aircraft.

== German ==
=== Heer ===
- 302nd Static Infantry Division (Generalleutnant Konrad Haase), part of LXXXI Army Corps, Army Group D, defending the coast at Dieppe.
  - 570th Infantry Regiment
  - 571st Infantry Regiment
  - 572nd Infantry Regiment
  - 302nd Artillery Regiment
  - 302nd Reconnaissance Battalion
  - 302nd Antitank Battalion
  - 302nd Engineer Battalion
- 216th Battery
- 813th Battery
- 2/770 Army Coastal Battery
- Heavy Flak Group

Reserves not participating in the battle:

- 676th Infantry Regiment of the 332nd Static Infantry Division
- 10th Panzer Division
- SS Infantry Brigade Leibstandarte Adolf Hitler

=== Luftwaffe ===
- Jagdgeschwader 2 (2nd Fighter Wing)
- Jagdgeschwader 26 (26th Fighter Wing)
- Kampfgeschwader 2 (2nd Bomber Wing)
- II./Kampfgeschwader 40 (II. Group/40th Bomber Wing)
- 1.(F)/123 Reconnaissance

== Footnotes ==
- Roskill, S. W. (1962) [1957]. The War at Sea 1939–1945: Period of Balance. History of the Second World War United Kingdom Military Series. Vol. II (repr. 3rd ed.). London: HMSO. OCLC 929331838.
- Schoeman, Michael (December 1969), "Air Umbrella - Dieppe", Military History Journal, vol. 1, no. 5, The South African Military History Society
