= HMS Berkeley (L17) =

Destroyer of the Royal Navy

Coordinates: 49°59′N 01°02′E

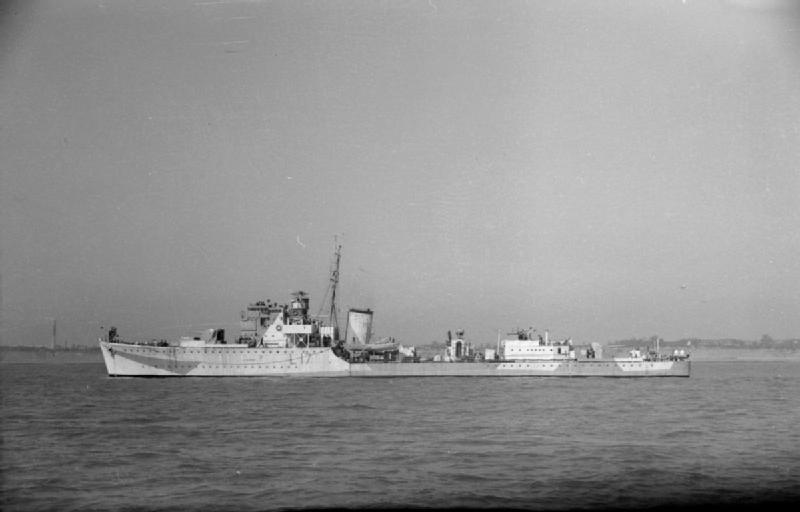

History

United Kingdom
- Name: HMS Berkeley
- Namesake: A fox hunt in Gloucestershire, England
- Builder: Cammell Laird, Birkenhead
- Laid down: 8 June 1939
- Launched: 29 January 1940
- Completed: 6 June 1940
- Commissioned: 6 June 1940
- Identification: Pennant number: L17
- Motto: Dieu avec nous
- Honours and awards: North Sea 1942; English Channel 1942; Dieppe 1942
- Fate: Scuttled 19 August 1942
- Badge: On a Field Gold. Upon a Red roundel, in front of two hunting horns in saltire gold and a cross patee white.

General characteristics
- Class & type: Hunt-class destroyer
- Displacement: 1,000 long tons (1,016 t) standard; 1,340 long tons (1,362 t) full load
- Length: 280 ft (85 m)
- Beam: 29 ft (8.8 m)
- Draught: 10 ft 9 in (3.28 m)
- Propulsion: Two x Admiralty 3 drum boilers; Two shaft Parsons geared turbines; 19,000 shp (14,000 kW)
- Speed: 27.5 knots (50.9 km/h; 31.6 mph)
- Range: 3,500 nmi (6,480 km) at 15 knots (28 km/h) / 1,000 nmi (2,000 km) at 26 knots (48 km/h)
- Complement: 146
- Armament: 4 × QF 4-inch (102 mm) Mark XVI guns on twin mounts Mk. XIX; 4 × QF 2-pounder (40 mm) Mk. VIII guns on quad mount MK.VII; 2 × 20 mm Oerlikons on single mounts P Mk. III; 40 depth charges, 2 throwers, 1 rack

HMS Berkeley was a Type I Hunt-class destroyer of the Royal Navy. She was a member of the first subgroup of the Hunt class and saw service in World War II before being bombed at Dieppe and then scuttled by HMS Albrighton.

== Design ==
The Hunt-class was meant to fill the Royal Navy's need for a large number of small destroyer-type vessels capable of both convoy escort and operations with the fleet, and were designed with a heavy anti-aircraft armament of six 4-inch anti-aircraft guns and a speed of 29 knots (33 mph; 54 km/h). An error during design, which was only discovered once the first ship of the class Atherstone was built, meant that the ships as designed were dangerously unstable. To restore stability, the first 23 Hunts, including Berkeley, were modified by removing a twin 4-inch mount, cutting down the ships' superstructure and adding ballast. These ships were known as Type I Hunts. Later ships in the class had their beam increased, which allowed them to carry the originally intended armament, and were known as Type II Hunts.

Berkeley was 264 feet 3 inches (80.54 m) long between perpendiculars and 280 feet (85.34 m) overall. The ship's beam was 29 feet 0 inches (8.84 m) and draught 7 feet 9 inches (2.36 m). Displacement was 1,000 long tons (1,000 t) standard and 1,360 long tons (1,380 t) under full load. Two Admiralty boilers raising steam at 300 pounds per square inch (2,100 kPa) and 620 °F (327 °C) fed Parsons single-reduction geared steam turbines that drove two propeller shafts, generating 19,000 shaft horsepower (14,000 kW) at 380 rpm. This gave a speed of 27.5 knots (50.9 km/h; 31.6 mph).

The ship's main gun armament was four 4 inch (102 mm) QF Mk XVI dual purpose (anti-ship and anti-aircraft) guns in two twin mounts, with one mount forward and one aft. Additional close-in anti-aircraft armament was provided by a quadruple 2-pounder "pom-pom" mount. Type I Hunts were later modified by adding two single Oerlikon 20 mm cannon on the bridge wings. Up to 40 depth charges could be carried. The ship had a complement of 146 officers and men.

== Construction ==
Berkeley was one of the first 10 Hunt-class destroyers ordered on 21 March 1939 as part of the 1939 Construction Programme. The ship was laid down on 8 June 1939 at Cammell Laird's Birkenhead shipyard as Admiralty Job No. J3302. She was launched on 29 January 1940 and completed on 6 June 1940, with the pennant number L17. Berkeley, named after one of two Gloucestershire Fox Hunts, was the first ship of that name to serve with the Royal Navy.

== Career ==
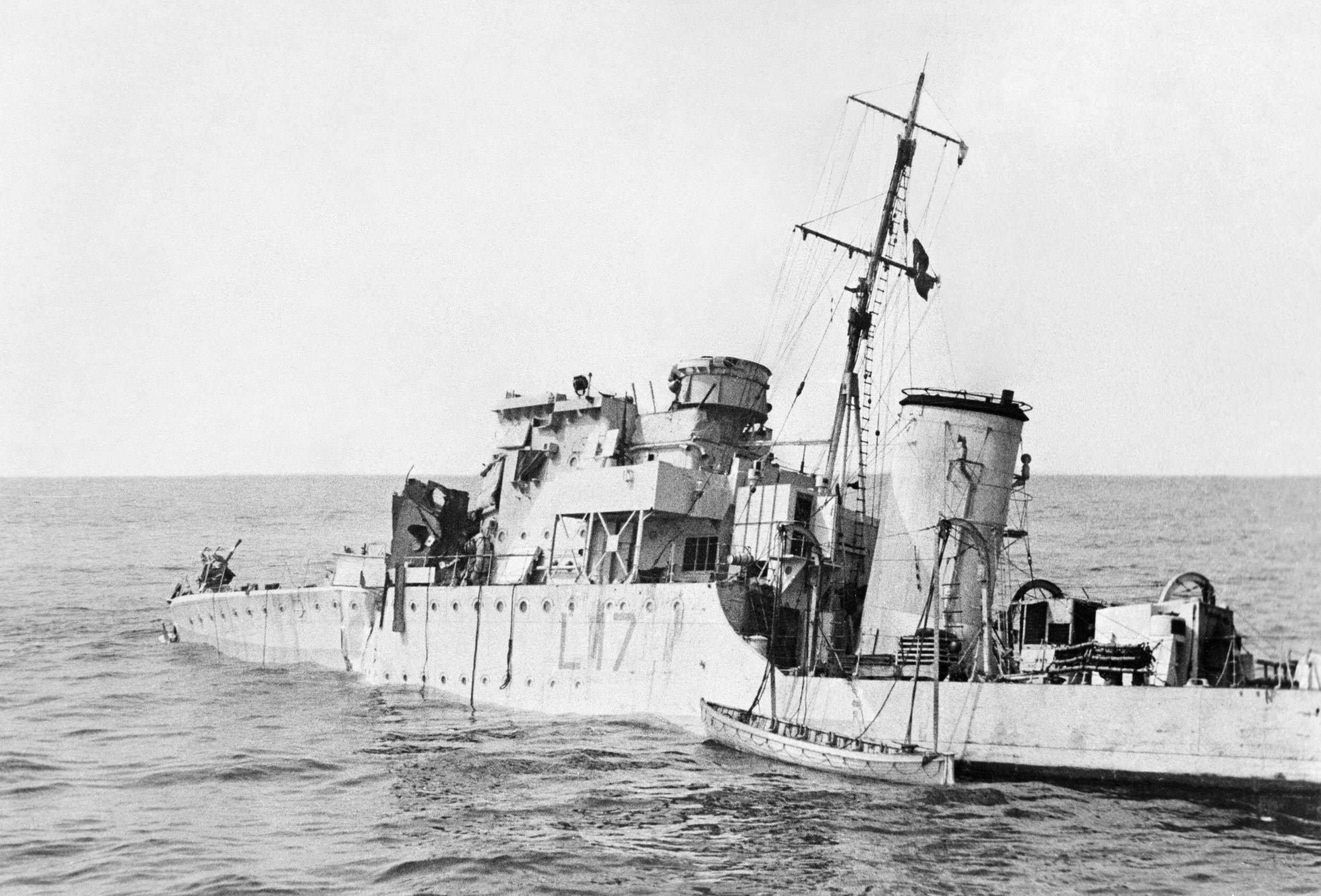
Berkeley after having been bombed on 19. August 1942.

Berkeley interrupted her work up to take part in participated in Operation Aerial, the evacuation of the remnants of the British Expeditionary Force from ports in western France. Berkeley ferried senior naval officers to St Nazaire to help organise evacuations from there, and then sent to Bordeaux to act as a radio link to Paul Reynaud and the French government. After the Fall of France, she evacuated the remaining British embassy staff as well as Władysław Raczkiewicz and Polish and Czech troops.

Following completion of her work up, Berkeley joined the 1st Destroyer Flotilla based at Portsmouth, with duties of convoy escort in the English Channel and the North Sea. In August 1940, Berkeley escorted minelayers during minelaying Operation SN32. On the night of 8/9 September 1940, Berkeley, together with the destroyers Atherstone, Beagle, Bulldog and Fernie, carried out a sweep along the French coast between Le Touquet and Cap d'Antifer against reported concentrations of German invasion shipping. No contact was made with the enemy. On 20 December 1940, she received minor damage when a mine exploded 30 yd (27 m) off her port side when in the outer Medway. She was repaired at Chatham Dockyard.

After the repairs were completed, Berkeley resumed convoy escort duties in January 1941. On 22 February, she escorted HMS Icarus during the minelaying Operation JK off the French coast. For the rest of the year, Berkeley escorted convoys and patrolled the English Channel. On 15 February 1942, she participated in the unsuccessful attempt to intercept the German battleships Scharnhorst and Gneisenau during the Channel Dash. Six Hunt-class destroyers were at sea on 15 January, taking part in exercises with the six old fleet destroyers of the 15th and 21st Destroyer Flotillas. When the force was ordered to intercept the German ships, the Hunts were sent back to port as they carried no torpedoes, and so could not cause significant damage to the German heavy units.

Lieutenant James Yorke became her commander on 27 March 1942. Berkeley continued convoy escort duties until July 1942, when she was selected to be part of the naval force supporting Operation Jubilee. On 19 August 1942, Berkeley escorted the Dieppe raiding force, screening the landing forces. Berkeley then provided gunfire support, but the 4-inch guns of the destroyers proved to be of limited effectiveness. While the force was withdrawing, Berkeley was hit by two bombs dropped from Focke-Wulf Fw 190s of Jagdgeschwader 2, (Note: Other sources state that Berkeley was hit by bombs from Dornier Do 217 bombers.) which broke the ship's back. Sixteen of Berkeley's crew, together with a number of Canadian troops who had been picked up from a landing craft shortly before, were killed. As the damage was beyond control, she was abandoned, and then scuttled by torpedoes from the escort destroyer Albrighton.

== Bibliography ==
- Battle Summary No. 33: Raid on Dieppe (Naval Operations) (PDF). Naval Staff History: Second World War. Historical Section, Admiralty. 1959. Archived from the original (PDF) on 13 August 2022.
- Colledge, J. J.; Warlow, Ben (2006) [1969]. Ships of the Royal Navy: The Complete Record of All Fighting Ships of the Royal Navy from the 15th Century to the Present (3rd Rev ed.). London: Chatham Publishing. ISBN 978-1-86176-281-8. OCLC 67375475.
- English, John (1987). The Hunts: A History of the Design, Development and Careers of the 86 Destroyers of This Class Built for the Royal and Allied Navies During World War II. Cumbria, UK: World Ship Society. ISBN 0-905617-44-4.
- Friedman, Norman (2008). British Destroyers and Frigates: The Second World War and After. Barnsley, UK: Seaforth Publishing. ISBN 978-1-84832-015-4.
- Gardiner, Robert; Chesneau, Roger, eds. (1980). Conway's All The World's Fighting Ships 1922–1946. London: Conway Maritime Press. ISBN 0-85177-146-7.
- Goss, Chris; Cornwell, Peter; Rauchbach, Bernd (2010). Luftwaffe Fighter-Bombers Over Britain: The Tip and Run Campaign, 1942-43. Stackpole Books. ISBN 978-0-8117-0691-9.
- Hepper, David (2022). British Warship Losses in the Modern Era: 1920–1982. Barnsley, UK: Seaforth Publishing. ISBN 978-1-3990-9766-6.
- H.M. Ships Damaged or Sunk by Enemy Action: 3rd. SEPT. 1939 to 2nd. SEPT. 1945. Admiralty. 1952. Archived from the original on 2 November 2023.
- "Home Fleet Destroyer Command - 1 March to 30 September 1940". Admiralty War Diaries of World War 2 - ADM 199/427. Naval-History.net. 9 January 2015.
- Lenton, H.T. (1970). Navies of the Second World War: British Fleet & Escort Destroyers Volume Two. London: Macdonald & Co. ISBN 0-356-03122-5.
- Manning, T. D.; Walker, C. F. (1959). British Warship Names. London: Putnam.
- Rohwer, Jürgen (2005). Chronology of the War at Sea 1939–1945: The Naval History of World War Two (Third Revised ed.). Annapolis, Maryland, US: Naval Institute Press. ISBN 1-59114-119-2.
- Smith, Peter C. (1984). Hold the Narrow Sea: Naval Warfare in the English Channel 1939–1945. Ashbourne, UK: Moorland Publishing Co. Ltd. ISBN 0-86190-079-0.
- Winser, John de S. (1999). B.E.F. Ships before, at and after Dunkirk. Gravesend, UK: World Ship Society. ISBN 0-905617-91-6.
- Zuehlke, Mark (2012). Tragedy at Dieppe: Operation Jubilee, August 19, 1942. Vancouver, Canada: Douglas & McIntyre. ISBN 978-1-55365-835-1.
