= Dieppe Raid =

World War II battle on north coast of France

- Part of the Western Front of the Second World War
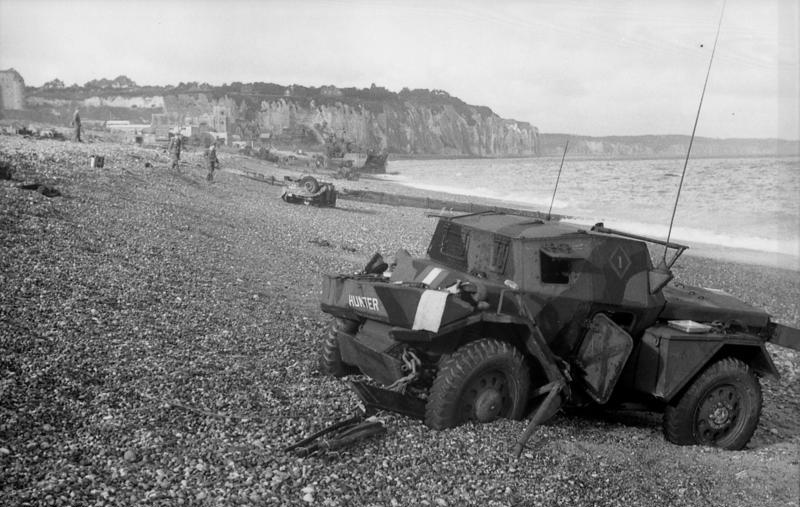
- An abandoned, damaged British Daimler Dingo on the beach
Date	19 August 1942
Location	Dieppe, France 49.9333°N 1.0833°E
Result	German victory

Belligerents
Canada; United Kingdom; Free France; Poland (Note: Polish forces included No. 302, 303, 306, 308 and No. 317 Fighter Squadrons of the Polish Air Forces fighting with the RAF, as well as the destroyer ORP Ślązak); Czechoslovakia (Note: The Czechoslovak forces included No. 310 and No. 312 Fighter Squadrons of the RAF)	Germany

Commanders and leaders
(United Kingdom) Louis Mountbatten; (Canada) John Roberts; (United Kingdom) Trafford Leigh-Mallory; (United Kingdom) John Hughes-Hallett; (United Kingdom) Lord Lovat	(Nazi Germany) Gerd von Rundstedt; (Nazi Germany) Konrad Haase

Strength
(Canada) 2nd Infantry Division: 14th Armoured Regiment (Calgary Regiment); 29 Churchill tanks (Note: Mk I, II, II Oke, III); (United Kingdom) Commandos: 3 Commando; 4 Commando; 10 Commando; 30 Commando (Note: O'Keefe alternately states they were sent in as part of 40 Commando but 30 Commando/30AU was not formed until a month later and indications that it was involved may be erroneous); 40 Commando; Royal Navy; 237 ships and landing craft including eight destroyers Royal Air Force; 74 squadrons Royal Canadian Air Force; 2 squadrons c. 10,500 men, including 50 U.S. Army Rangers attached to 4 Commando and 15 French Commando to 10 Commando	(Nazi Germany) 302nd Static Division ≈1,500 men Does not include Luftwaffe and Kriegsmarine

Casualties and losses
Canadian Army: 907 killed 2,460 wounded 1,946 captured British Army: 247 killed United States Army: 3 killed 5 wounded 3 captured Royal Navy; 1 destroyer 33 landing craft 550 killed and wounded Royal Air Force; 64 Supermarine Spitfire fighters 20 Hawker Hurricane fighters 6 Douglas Boston bombers 10 North American Mustang Mk 1 fighters 62 killed 30 wounded 17 captured	Wehrmacht: 311 killed 280 wounded Kriegsmarine; 1 submarine chaser UJ-1404 sunk Luftwaffe; 23 Fw 190; 25 Dornier Do 217
- Location within France

Operation Jubilee or the Dieppe Raid (19 August 1942) was an Allied amphibious attack on the German-occupied port of Dieppe in northern France, during the Second World War. Over 6,050 infantry, predominantly Canadian, supported by a Canadian tank regiment, were landed by a Royal Navy task force under cover of the Royal Air Force and Royal Canadian Air Force.

The port was to be captured and held for a short period, to test the feasibility of a landing and to gather intelligence. German coastal defences, port structures and important buildings were to be demolished. The raid was intended to boost Allied morale, to demonstrate the commitment of the United Kingdom to re-open the Western Front, and to support the Soviet Union, which was fighting on the Eastern Front.

The Luftwaffe made a maximum effort against the landing as the RAF had expected, and the RAF lost 106 aircraft (at least 32 to anti-aircraft fire or accidents) against 48 German losses. The Royal Navy lost 33 landing craft and a destroyer. Aerial and naval support was insufficient to enable the ground forces to achieve their objectives. The tanks were trapped on the beach and the infantry was largely prevented from entering the town by obstacles and German fire.

After less than six hours, mounting casualties forced a retreat. Within ten hours, 3,623 of the 6,086 men who landed had been killed, wounded, or taken prisoner. 5,000 were Canadians, who suffered a 68% casualty rate, with 3,367 killed, wounded or taken prisoner. The operation was a fiasco in which only one landing force achieved its objective, and a small amount of military intelligence was gathered.

Both sides learnt important lessons regarding coastal assaults. The Allies learnt lessons that influenced the success of the Normandy landings. Artificial harbours were declared crucial, tanks were adapted specifically for beaches, a new integrated tactical air force strengthened ground support, and capturing a major port at the outset was no longer seen as a priority. Churchill and Mountbatten both stated that these lessons had outweighed the cost. The Germans also believed that Dieppe was a learning experience and made a considerable effort to improve the way they defended the occupied coastlines of Europe.

== Background ==
=== Dunkirk to Dieppe ===
In the aftermath of the Dunkirk evacuation of the British Expeditionary Force in May 1940, the British started on the development of a substantial raiding force under the umbrella of Combined Operations Headquarters. This was accompanied by the development of techniques and equipment for amphibious warfare. In late 1941, a scheme was put forward for the landing of 12 divisions around Le Havre, assuming a withdrawal of German troops to counter Soviet success in the east. From this came Operation Rutter to test the feasibility of capturing a port by an opposed landing, the investigation of the problems of operating the invasion fleet and testing equipment and techniques of the assault.

After its victory in the Battle of Britain in 1940 and the Luftwaffe having switched to night bombing in the autumn of 1940, the day fighters of Royal Air Force Fighter Command were "a force without an immediate mission". Without anything else to do, the day fighters of RAF Fighter Command were in the spring of 1941 deployed on a series of search-and-destroy missions of flying over France to engage the Luftwaffe in combat. In the second half of 1941, the aerial offensive over France was greatly stepped up, leading to the loss of 411 British and Canadian aircraft. In the spring of 1942, the Luftwaffe deployed the new Focke-Wulf Fw 190 fighter to its airfields in France.

The Fw 190 was superior to the Supermarine Spitfire Mk V and Hawker Hurricane Mk IIs used by the British and Canadian pilots and losses over France increased. The RAF was convinced it was winning the air war, believing that the loss of 259 Spitfires over France in the first six months of 1942 were justified by the reported destruction of 197 German aircraft in the same period. A major problem for the RAF was that the Luftwaffe German fighter pilots declined to engage in combat over the French coast and instead operated inland, forcing the British Spitfires to fly deeper into France, using up their fuel, placing them at a disadvantage when the Luftwaffe engaged, and, critically, if RAF pilots had to bail out they would be in enemy occupied territory, i.e. RAF Fighter command was now operating with all the disadvantages the Luftwaffe had to contend with in the Battle of Britain. Thanks to intelligence provided by Ultra, the British knew that if any Allied force attempted to seize a port in France, the Germans would assume it to be the beginning of an invasion and thus the Luftwaffe was to mount a maximum effort. The leaders of Fighter Command lobbied hard in early 1942, for a raid to seize a French port to provoke the Luftwaffe into action with the RAF at an advantage.

=== Dieppe ===
Dieppe, a coastal town in the Seine-Inférieure department of France, is built along a long cliff that overlooks the English Channel. The river Scie is on the western end of the town and the Arques flows through the town and into a medium-sized harbour. In 1942, the Germans had demolished some seafront buildings to aid in coastal defence and had set up two large artillery batteries at Berneval-le-Grand and Varengeville-sur-Mer. One important consideration for the planners was that Dieppe was within range of the RAF's fighter aircraft.

There was also intense pressure from the Soviet government to open a second front in Western Europe. By early 1942, the Wehrmacht's Operation Barbarossa had clearly failed to destroy the Soviet Union. However, the Germans in a much less ambitious summer offensive launched in June, were deep into southern Soviet territory, pushing toward Stalingrad. Joseph Stalin himself repeatedly demanded that the Allies create a second front in France to force the Germans to move at least 40 divisions away from the Eastern Front to remove some of the pressure put on the Red Army in the Soviet Union.

The proposed Allied invasion of continental Europe in 1943, Operation Roundup, was considered impractical by military planners, and the alternative of landing in 1942, Operation Sledgehammer, even more difficult. The British had been engaged with the Italians and the Germans in the Western Desert campaign since June 1940. At the Second Washington Conference in June 1942, U.S. President Franklin D. Roosevelt and British Prime Minister Winston Churchill decided to postpone the cross-English Channel invasion and schedule Operation Torch, the Anglo-American invasion of French North Africa, for later that year. In the interim, a large-scale Canadian-led raid on the French coast was intended to take some of the pressure off the Soviet Union.

The objective of the raid was discussed by Winston Churchill in his war memoirs:

I thought it most important that a large-scale operation should take place this summer, and military opinion seemed unanimous that until an operation on that scale was undertaken, no responsible general would take the responsibility of planning the main invasion ...In discussion with Admiral Mountbatten it became clear that time did not permit a new large-scale operation to be mounted during the summer (after Rutter had been cancelled), but that Dieppe could be remounted (with the new code-name "Jubilee") within a month, provided extraordinary steps were taken to ensure secrecy. For this reason, no records were kept but, after the Canadian authorities and the Chiefs of Staff had given their approval, I personally went through the plans with the C.I.G.S., Admiral Mountbatten, and the Naval Force Commander, Captain J. Hughes-Hallett.

=== Role of Louis Mountbatten ===
On the directive of Winston Churchill, Louis Mountbatten was recalled from command of the aircraft carrier HMS Illustrious while it was under repair in the US in 1941 (Note: Mountbatten had been posted early to the ship, which was not expected to be back in service until November, so he could tour the United States meeting influential members of press, military and the administration) and instated as adviser on combined operations of the British Army (replacing Admiral Roger Keyes (Note: Keyes was a veteran of First World War amphibious raids including the Gallipoli campaign and Zeebrugge raid) who as director of combined operations had fallen out with the chiefs of staff and Churchill), later to be promoted to the post of chief of combined operations on 4 March 1942. Churchill personally briefed Mountbatten that he wanted raids of increasing intensity, developing equipment and training with a view to the invasion of France; the chiefs of staff directive limited Mountbatten's authority to approving only small raids, through using special service troops. He held a dual role as adviser to the chiefs of staff and commodore combined operations, handling the administration of both small raids and larger operations. In 1942 Mountbatten was raised by Churchill as a full member of meetings of the chiefs of staff with acting rank of vice-admiral, air marshal and lieutenant general. In May 1942 it was agreed that Combined Operations HQ would handle detailed planning of the Dieppe raid.

COHQ proposed flanking landings that would take Dieppe in a pincer movement, but Home Forces argued for a frontal attack as, within the 15-hour window of the raid, the flank attacks would not have enough time to achieve success. At meetings Mountbatten argued that it was sufficient for the raid to show that the tactics would have worked, General Bernard Montgomery countered that if the raid did not take Dieppe it would be seen as a failure. An initial heavy bombardment from the air was approved (despite concerns about civilian casualties) then rescinded due to army opinion that wreckage would block streets for the tanks and RAF belief that most of the bombs would end up in the sea or inland. Mountbatten pressed for the firepower of a battleship for bombardment in lieu of bombing but neither this nor cruisers was permitted. Combined Operations' proposed assault force of marines and commandos was passed over in favour of untried Canadian troops.

British intelligence on the Dieppe area was extremely poor. On 25 April 1942, an intelligence briefing given to Mountbatten and the COHQ chiefs stated that Dieppe was held by 1,500 troops of the 110th Division of the Wehrmacht whose headquarters were at Arques-la-Bataille. It was true that the 110th Division had captured Dieppe on 31 May 1940 and occupied it for almost a year, but the 110th Division had been sent east in April 1941 to take part in Operation Barbarossa and been replaced by the 302nd Division. The British historian Tim Saunders wrote that the level of knowledge possessed by British intelligence could be seen in that it was believed that the 110th Division was still occupying Dieppe a year after it had been pulled out and that British intelligence did not know that the 110th Division was fighting on the Eastern Front in April 1942. Furthermore, the total number of the 302nd Division's forces in the Dieppe area numbered 6,000 men instead of the 1,500 men that COHQ had reported and the divisional headquarters were at Envermeu instead of Arques-la-Bataille. Starting in September 1941, the Organisation Todt using slave labour from Eastern Europe had started to build a system of fortifications at Dieppe, which the Germans called Festung Dieppe (Fortress Dieppe). British intelligence had some idea that the Organisation Todt were building fortifications at Dieppe, but most of the fortifications were unknown to the planners of Operation Rutter with fateful consequences for the men who landed at Dieppe who faced greater defensive firepower than was expected. The planners of Operation Rutter were aware of the system of barbed wire, minefields, pillboxes housing machine guns and bunkers on the beaches of Dieppe, but most notably they had no idea of the Organisation Todt having built tunnels into the two headlands on either side of Dieppe, which housed rail-mounted artillery, which could bring down devastating fire on any force that landed on the beaches. Many veterans of Dieppe believed it was the presence of the rail-mounted artillery in the two headlands that did the most to stop their attack, and if some action had been taken to neutralize the artillery, the raid would have been more successful.

Mountbatten was well known for his chivalry and charming abilities; however, he lacked experience in terms of actual warfare. (Note: Mountbatten had served in the Royal Navy since 1916) Even before taking up this role, Mountbatten had faced a rough patch at sea captaining the British Navy's HMS Kelly as commander of the 5th Destroyer Flotilla, where his performance was so below par that Denis Healey – who was secretary of state for defence when Mountbatten was chief of the defence staff in the 1960s – remarked, "but his birth saved him from the court martial any other officer would have faced".

Despite his shortcomings, Mountbatten played an important role in the planning of the whole operation. The Dieppe raid was intended as an experiment and was initially planned to take place at the end of June 1942. Preparations were in full swing with two rehearsals taking place in Bridport on 13 and 23 June; the second due to the debacle that the first rehearsal had turned into. However, bad weather delayed the operation by three weeks and two vessels that were to be used had been put out of action by bombs. This made the chiefs of staff uneasy thinking that the Germans would have found out about the attack by then as the plan was no longer a secret to the more than 10,000 Allied troops who had been informed of it. On 8 July, General Montgomery recommended calling off the attack altogether, and the idea would probably have been shelved had it not been for Mountbatten's proposal to relaunch the operation six weeks later, still aiming at Dieppe. His argument was that although the enemy must have found out that Dieppe had been the original target, "the very last thing they'd (Germans) ever imagine is that we would be so stupid as to lay on the same operation again".

=== Operation Rutter ===
Operation Rutter was devised to satisfy several objectives, as a show of support for the Soviet Union, to provide an opportunity for the Canadian forces in Britain to engage the German Army and as a morale booster for the British public, among whom were vociferous supporters of a second front to give tangible support to the Red Army.

At the time, the military thought that when the real invasion of Europe began, it would be important to quickly capture a port before the Germans could demolish the facilities or re-capture it by a counter-attack. The extent of the German fortification of French ports was uncertain and how organised an amphibious attack could be after a Channel crossing and how a surprise element could be achieved was also in doubt. Rutter was devised to provide the experience that would be needed later in the war.

Rutter was a combined operation, involving heavy bombers of RAF Bomber Command and the heavy ships of the Royal Navy to bombard German defences overlooking the beaches; parachute and glider troops would silence German heavy artillery commanding the approaches to the port. The main force of infantry and tanks would land and advance through the port to the outskirts and dig in to resist counter-attacks until it was time to withdraw and re-embark in their landing craft. The First Sea Lord, Dudley Pound, was opposed to Operation Rutter, which he felt to be too dangerous, but gave his approval as he knew he was out of favor with Churchill. Churchill was englamoured with the handsome, dashing Mountbatten who was full of dynamism and audacity while dismissing Pound as "too old, too sleepy and too cautious". In the spring and summer of 1942, Pound was deeply worried that Churchill would sack him and replace him with Mountbatten. Pound had fiercely attempted to block Mountbatten's elevation as Chief of Combined Operations who would serve as an equal member of the Chiefs of Staff committee in March, writing in a letter to Churchill on 7 March 1942 that "a junior Captain in a shore appointment being given three steps in rank" was profoundly wrong and would be widely seen that Churchill was favoring Mountbatten because he had royal blood. Mountbatten's promotion was widely seen within the Royal Navy as a sign that Churchill was grooming Mountbatten to be the next First Sea Lord. To rebut Churchill's charge that he was excessively cautious, Pound gave his approval to Operation Rutter at a meeting in London on 13 May 1942 despite his own doubts. The chief of the Air Staff, Air Chief Marshal Charles Portal, was primarily concerned with promoting the strategic bombing offensive against Germany, but saw Operation Rutter as a chance for Fighter Command to win a great victory by bringing out the Luftwaffe to battle at a place that favored the RAF. At the same meeting on 13 May, Portal strongly supported Operation Rutter. The Chief of the Imperial General Staff (CIGS), Alan Brooke, was opposed to Operation Rutter as unsound, but he felt his position as CIGS would be in danger if he opposed all of Churchill's plans. Brooke during his time as CIGS constantly fought with Churchill, whose plans he often considered to be reckless. Brooke was especially opposed to Operation Jupiter, a proposed invasion of Norway that Churchill favored, and later wrote in his diary "the disaster that resulted may be said to be part of the price paid for the slow strangulation of Jupiter".

The 2nd Canadian Infantry Division was chosen for the operation and given three months' specialist training in amphibious operations up to July. General Andrew McNaughton, the GOC of the 1st Canadian Army gave his approval when approached after consulting with his superiors in Ottawa. McNaughton had a dual command responsibility, being under the operational command of Bernard Montgomery, the GOC of South-Eastern Command while also being ultimately responsible to the government in Ottawa, which made for a difficult relationship as McNaughton always had to consult Ottawa first before making a major decision. McNaughton was first informed of Rutter on 30 April 1942 by Montgomery. Together with his deputy Harry Crerar, McNaughton chose the 2nd Division as the one best suited for the raid. Crerar seems to have learned of Operation Rutter much earlier than McNaughton as he attended a staff meeting with Brooke on 1 March 1942 where the CIGS had brought up the subject of Rutter. McNaughton was opposed to Churchill's plans to send his army to take part in Operation Jupiter-a plan McNaughton considered to be too risky-and he approved Operation Rutter as a way to deflect the allegation that he lacked aggression. Crerar was keen to have the Canadians involved in Operation Rutter and of all the Canadian officers, he pressed most strongly to have the 2nd Division take part in the raid on Dieppe.

General John Hamilton Roberts, the GOC of the 2nd Division, supported Rutter, saying the raid on Dieppe would be "a piece of cake" for his men. Furthermore, there were morale problems within the 1st Canadian Army by 1942, which languished on the sidelines of the war, guarding Britain against an invasion no longer felt to be likely. Many of the Canadian officers and the other ranks complained that the newspapers and newsreels told of the exploits of British, Australian, New Zealand, Indian and South African soldiers in North Africa with the Canadians being the only Commonwealth forces that were not in action. In December 1941, the Canadian Prime Minister William Lyon Mackenzie King had been booed and jeered by the Canadian soldiers during a visit to the United Kingdom with the general feeling within the Canadian Army being that Mackenzie King did not want the Canadians to see action. Churchill had echoed this criticism, charging that Canada was not doing as much as it could to win the war as the 1st Canadian Army sat on the sidelines. In this context, having the 2nd Division take part in what was supposed to be a glorious victory was an easy way for Mackenzie King to rebut these charges.

Roberts's deputy, Lieutenant Colonel C. Churchill Mann, wrote in May 1942 the plan offered "an almost fantastic conception of the place most suited to land a strong force" of tanks. The plan for Operation Rutter had originally called for Bomber Command to stage a heavy bombing raid on Dieppe to destroy the German defence, but Air Marshal Arthur Harris, the GOC of Bomber Command, was fanatically committed to winning the war via the bombing of German cities and was stoutly opposed to Bomber Command taking in what he deemed "side sides" as he called Operation Rutter. In addition, Churchill was concerned that innocent French civilians would be killed by a heavy bombing raid. Finally, Roberts suggested that having Dieppe destroyed in a bombing raid would hinder the movement of his tanks once they had gotten past the beaches, and pressed for the bombing raid to be cancelled. On 4 June 1942, Mountbatten at a staff meeting had first stated that Churchill was opposed to bombing Dieppe, and at another meeting on 5 July 1942 the planned bombing raid was cancelled despite Montgomery's statements without a heavy bombing raid the German defences along the beaches would decimate any attacking force. In late June 1942, Roberts started to express doubts about Operation Rutter, which led to McNaughton to send Crerar down to his headquarters to warn him that some "errors" were to be expected once the raid was launched, but that the Rutter plan was a good one that would be a success with the clear implication that another general would be chosen if Roberts continued to express his misgivings. The Canadians assembled at embarkation ports and went aboard their ships, where the target was revealed. German bombing of two of the assembled ships and inclement weather delayed sailing, and on 7 July, military decision makers cancelled Rutter and the troops disembarked.

Admiral Bertram Ramsay of the Royal Navy in a memo to the Chiefs of Staff sent in July 1942 demanded that the raids across the English Channel into France be stopped, which he were warned were "merely training the enemy". Ramsay pointed out that every successful raid had the effect of pointing out weaknesses in the most dramatic way possible in the German Atlantic Wall defence system, which the Wehrmacht generals were systemically correcting. Ramsay argued that given the way that the previous raids had exposed "weak spots" in the German coastal defences and that the Wehrmacht were correcting these "weak spots", that to continue to raid France was to court catastrophe as eventually there would be no "weak spots" to take advantage of and the raiding force would meet disaster. Ramsay did not specifically mention the planned raid on Dieppe, but it appears that he had the Dieppe raid in mind when he demanded the raids into France cease. Ramsay's memo had no effect on the planning for Dieppe. After Operation Rutter had been cancelled, Montgomery had ceased his involvement. Henceforward, the chain of command led from Mountbatten to McNaughton to Crerar to Roberts. On 15 August 1942, the 2nd Division was told to assemble for what was inaccurately described to them as a "training exercise". At the same time, Roberts assembled all of his division's battalion commanders to a meeting at Chichester, which was described to them as a "leadership lecture", where he revealed to them that the "training exercise" was just the cover for Operation Jubilee, which was to take place in four days' time. The 2nd Division's two brigades headed for Portsmouth and Southampton to board their ships while the Commando units assembled at Newhaven.

== Prelude ==
=== Operation Jubilee ===
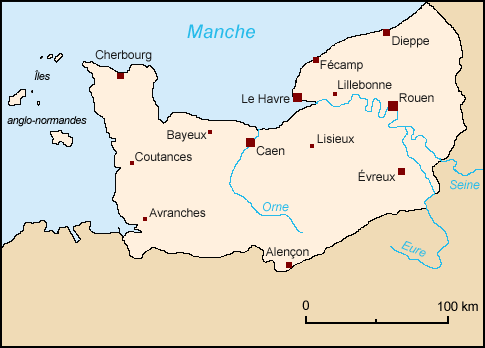
Dieppe is in the département of Seine-Maritime, in Normandy

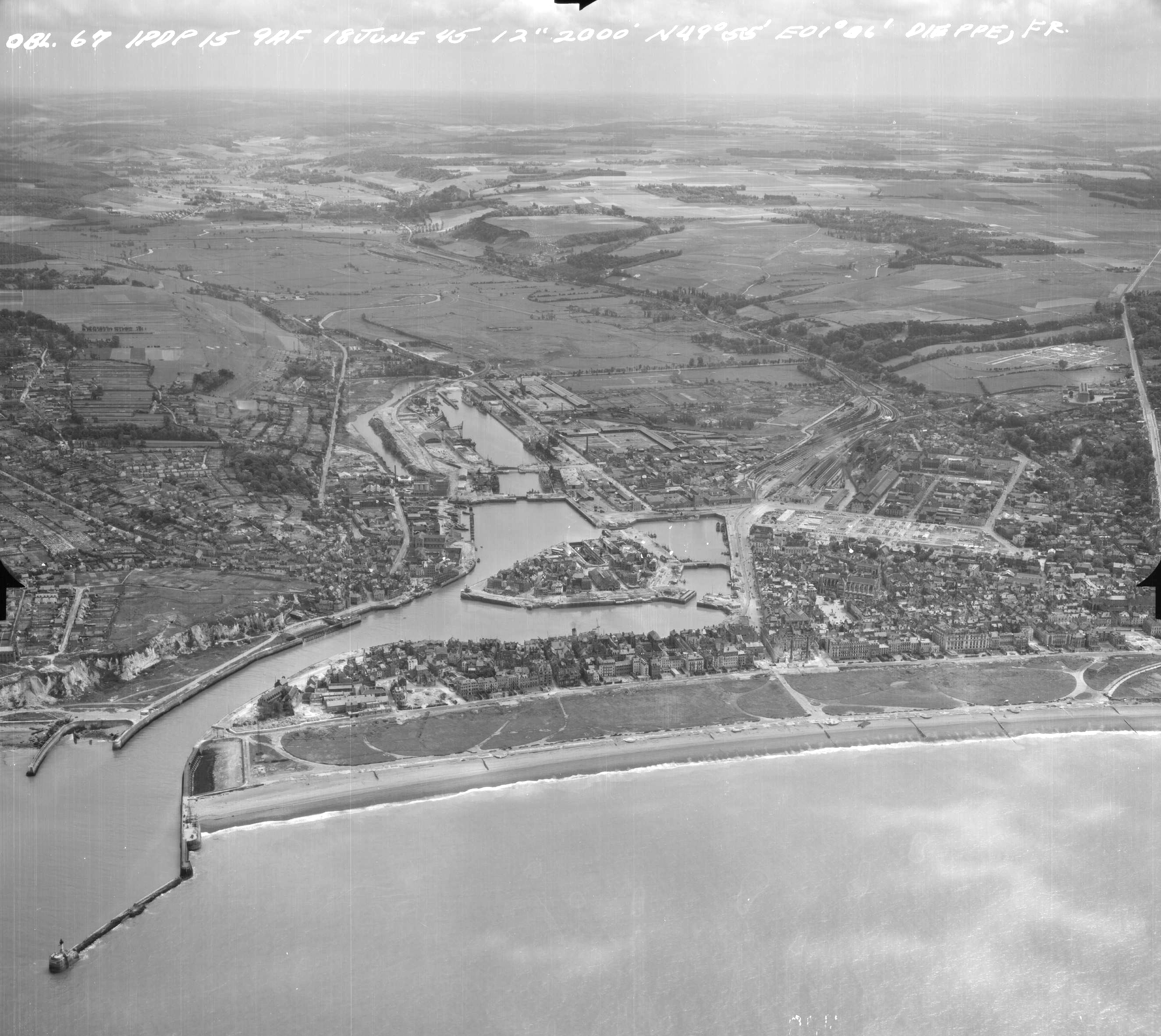
Oblique aerial photograph of Dieppe taken in June, 1945, showing the Red beach.

The Dieppe landings were planned on six beaches: four in front of the town itself, and two to the eastern and western flanks respectively. From east to west, the beaches were codenamed Yellow, Blue, Red, White, Green and Orange. No. 3 Commando would land on Yellow beach, the Royal Regiment of Canada on Blue. The main landings would take place on Red and White beaches by the Royal Hamilton Light Infantry, the Essex Scottish Regiment, Les Fusiliers Mont-Royal, A Commando Royal Marines and the armour. The South Saskatchewan Regiment and the Queen's Own Cameron Highlanders of Canada would land on Green Beach, and No. 4 Commando on Orange.

Armoured support was provided by the 14th Army Tank Regiment (The Calgary Regiment (Tank)), equipped with 58 of the newly introduced Churchill tanks to be delivered using the new landing craft tank (LCT). This would be their first use in combat. The Churchills, adapted to operate in the shallows near the beach, were a mix of types. Churchill Mark I was armed with a QF 2-pdr (40 mm) gun in the turret and a close support 3-inch howitzer in the hull. Churchill Mark II replaced the howitzer with a hull machine gun, and three Mark II Okes also carried a hull-mounted Ronson flamethrower. Churchill Mark IIIs were armed with the new QF 6-pdr (57 mm) gun in the turret and a hull machine gun. Engineers would use explosives to remove obstacles for the tanks.

=== Naval support ===
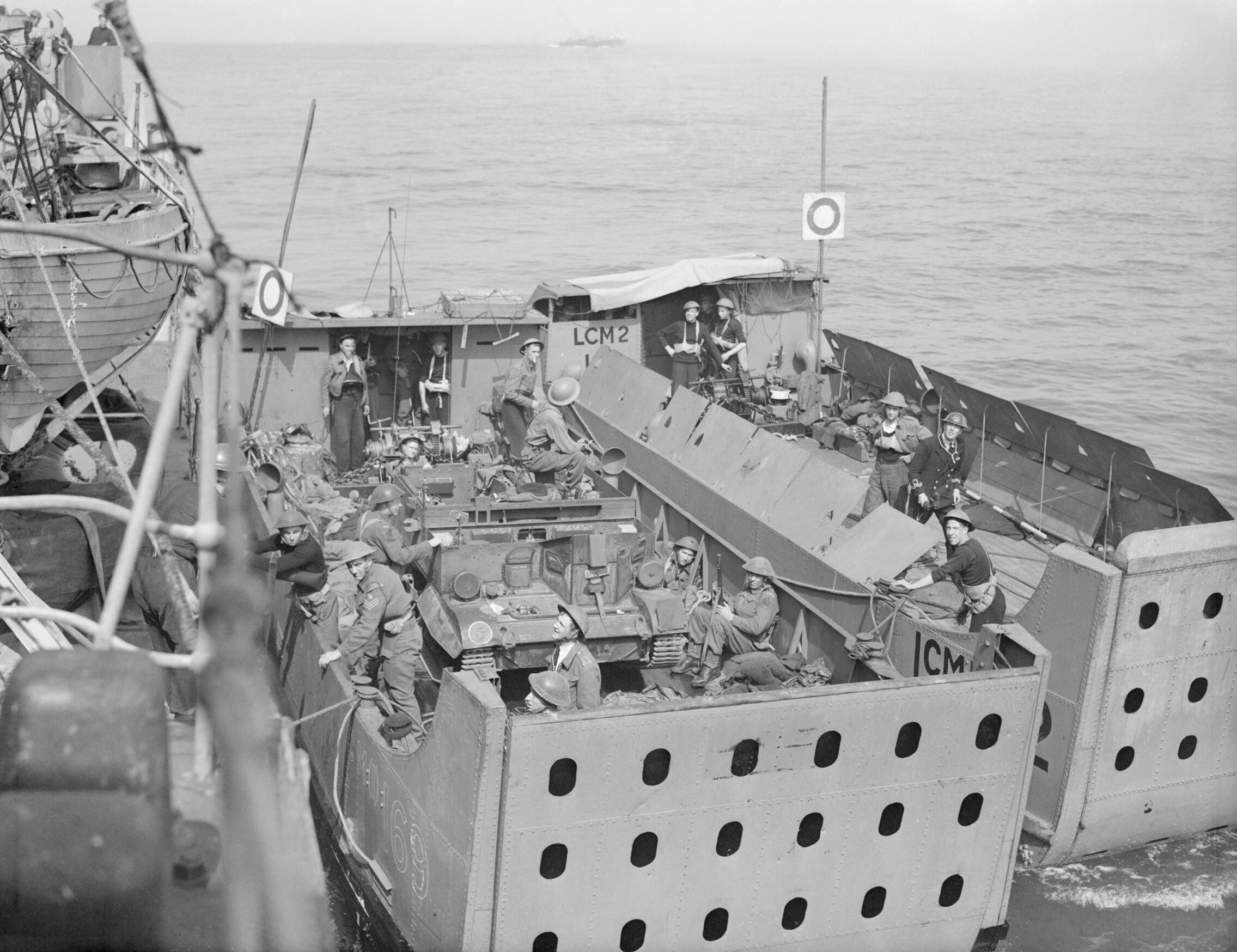
Landing Craft Mechanised Mark 1 returning from the beaches during the raid

The Royal Navy supplied 237 ships and landing craft. However, pre-landing naval gunfire support was limited, consisting of six Hunt-class destroyers each with four or six 4-inch (102 mm) guns. This was because of the reluctance of First Sea Lord Sir Dudley Pound to risk capital ships in an area he believed vulnerable to attacks by German aircraft. Mountbatten asked Pound to send a battleship in to provide fire support for the Dieppe raid but Pound was mindful that Japanese aircraft had sunk the battlecruiser HMS Repulse and the battleship Prince of Wales off Malaya in December 1941. Pound would not risk sending capital ships into waters where the Allies did not have air supremacy.

=== Air plan ===
==== Fighter Command ====
Over the past eighteen months of inconclusive attritional engagements, Fighter Command had established a measure of air superiority within range of its fighters. Day incursions into British airspace had dwindled to the occasional pair of German fighter bombers racing across the Channel, dropping their bombs and racing back. At 06:15 on 7 July, two ships in the Solent, with troops for Rutter on board, were hit but the bombs failed to explode and passed through their hulls, causing only four casualties. German photographic reconnaissance was much more difficult, because adequate results required the aircraft to fly a set course and height. Repeat sorties once or twice a week were ideal for comparative analysis of photographs but the Luftwaffe could manage only one set of pictures a month. A partial reconnaissance was obtained from 28 to 31 July, after Rutter had been cancelled and not again until 24 August, five days after Jubilee. The air plan was to exploit the raid to force the Luftwaffe to fight on British terms and suffer a serious defeat; Air Vice-Marshal Trafford Leigh-Mallory, the commander of 11 Group Fighter Command was to command the air effort, for which 56 fighter squadrons, comprising Spitfire fighters, Hurricane fighter-bombers and Typhoon low-level interceptors. (Note: The Hurricanes were a mix of "cannon-armed" Hurricane IIC and bomb-carrying Hurricanes) Four Mustang Mk I squadrons of Army Cooperation Command were provided for long-range reconnaissance and a contingent of five bomber squadrons were to participate for smoke laying and tactical bombing. The landings could be expected to prompt a maximum effort by the Luftwaffe in Northern France, Belgium and the Netherlands, with about 250 fighters and 220 bombers.

Leigh-Mallory controlled the air battle from 11 Group headquarters at RAF Uxbridge; commands flowing through the system as normal to sector control rooms and from there to the airfields. An RAF officer from Hut 3 at Bletchley Park was seconded to the 11 Group Operations Room to filter material to the Y-stations at RAF Cheadle and RAF Kingsdown which intercepted wireless telegraphy (W/T) and radio telephony (R/T) transmissions and used direction finding to pinpoint the origin of the signals. The intention was to reduce the time to pass decryptions of material from German radar, observer posts and fighter control to 11 Group through "the most expert officer in Y on German Fighter Defence and its ramifications". The fighter controllers on the headquarters ship HMS Calpe and Berkeley could communicate with the raid fighter cover on a shared frequency. The "close support" fighters checked in with the headquarters ship as they approached so the fighter controller could direct them onto alternative targets as required.

The moving of squadrons within 11 Group and reinforcement with 15 squadrons from outside 11 Group were carried out 14–15 August under the guise of "Exercise Venom".

==== 2 Group ====
On 29 June, 2 Group, Bomber Command, was ordered to send sixteen Douglas Bostons each from 88 Squadron and 107 Squadron from their East Anglian bases to RAF Ford in West Sussex; 226 Squadron, with its long range Bostons, was to stand by at its base for Operation Rutter. From 4 July, aircraft were to be maintained at thirty minutes readiness to fly Circus operations against German road transport and any tanks that appeared. For speed the crews were briefed in advance and were to have a final briefing at their airfield dispersals just before take-off. The operation was cancelled after two assault ships were bombed by the Luftwaffe. On 14 August, 2 Group was notified that the raid on Dieppe was back on as Operation Jubilee. The move to RAF Ford was retained but 226 Squadron was to fly from RAF Thruxton in Hampshire to lay smoke screens to obstruct German gunners on the high ground around Dieppe. No. 226 Squadron, joined by four crews from the other squadrons, began training at Thruxton on smoke munitions, 100 lb (45 kg) smoke bombs and Smoke Curtain Installations, carried in the bomb bays of some of the Bostons, which were to take off before dawn and operate without fighter escort.

=== Intelligence ===
Intelligence on the area was sparse: there were dug-in German gun positions on the cliffs, but these had not been detected or spotted by air reconnaissance photographers. The planners had assessed the beach gradient and its suitability for tanks only by scanning holiday snapshots, which led to an underestimation of the German strength and of the terrain. The outline plan for the abortive Operation Rutter (which became the basis for Operation Jubilee) stated that "intelligence reports indicate that Dieppe is not heavily defended and that the beaches in the vicinity are suitable for landing infantry, and armoured fighting vehicles at some".

=== German forces ===
==== Army ====
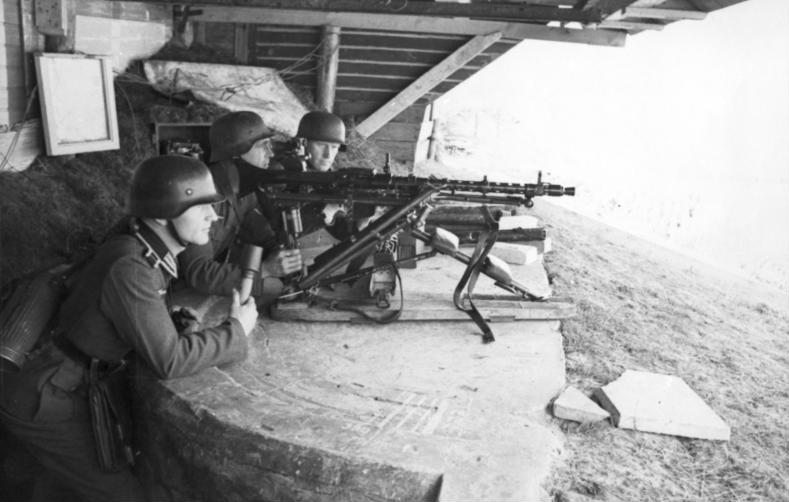
A German MG34 medium machine gun emplacement

The Germans were aware that the Allies might launch a large-scale amphibious operation some time in summer 1942. In Führer Order Number 40 issued in March 1942, Adolf Hitler had instructed his generals to assume that any Allied attempt to capture a French port city was the start of an invasion and to react accordingly. In June 1942, the Wehrmacht had launched an offensive designed to capture the Soviet oil fields in the Caucasus and thereby win the war against the Soviet Union. In the summer of 1942, the Wehrmacht had advanced deep into the Caucasus while an elite field army had been sent to secure the flank by capturing Stalingrad. Believing that he was on the brink of victory on the Eastern Front, Hitler was convinced that Anglo-American forces would attempt an invasion of France in the summer of 1942 in a desperate bid to save the Soviet Union from defeat, and accordingly Hitler had ordered Field Marshal Gerd von Rundstedt, the Supreme Commander in the West, to prepare for the expected invasion.

Luftwaffe reconnaissance aircraft had noticed a marked increase in the number of ships in the British Channel ports as the photos taken by the Luftwaffe showed that there were 1,146 ships and naval landing crafting in the Channel ports on 3 June 1942, which had risen to 2,802 on 23 July 1942. In July, Supreme Commander in the West Field Marshal von Rundstedt wrote an assessment which concluded that paratroops were to be expected, as well as a large Allied fighter and bomber force. Rundstedt wrote that "at the point of landing, the enemy will win command of the air. He will then use the bulk of his air forces against defences on the ground… The enemy – in order to achieve an attack en masse – will use all the aircraft he has, even slower types". The Abwehr (German intelligence) vastly overestimated the size of British forces on the other side of the English Channel and the German General Staff erroneously calculated that the British could land 300,000 men in northern France in three days. On the basis of the information he had, Rundstedt believed that a major raid or even an invasion of France would be attempted in the summer of 1942, which led him to put his forces on the highest state of alert. Rundstedt believed that the most likely landing places were the French ports which served as bases for the Kriegsmarine's submarines, the Brittany peninsula or a French Channel port, which would serve as a base for air and naval attacks on German forces.

It was German policy to send the best units of the Wehrmacht to fight on the Eastern Front in 1941-1942, and most of the divisions in France in 1942 were lesser units considered unfit to fight on the Eastern Front or were once higher quality units that had been so mauled on the Eastern Front that they had been sent to France to serve as a cadre to rebuild the shattered divisions. The 302nd Infantry Division, which held Dieppe in August 1942, was a low-quality division formed in Bavaria in October 1940. Hauptman (Captain) Lindener of the 571st Infanterie regiment, which formed part of the 302nd Infanterie Division wrote: "The coastal defence divisions were second class. This is a hard word, but essentially true". After completing its training in the Reich, the 302nd Infantry Division had been sent to France in April 1941, where it had taken up its positions in the Dieppe area. The majority of the 6,000 or so men who served in the 302nd Division were older men judged unfit to serve on the Eastern Front and the division had suffered from a continuing shortage of equipment, especially motor vehicles.

In August, German forces at Dieppe were on high alert, having been warned by French double agents that the British were showing interest in the area. They had also detected increased radio traffic and landing craft being concentrated in the southern British coastal ports. Dieppe and the flanking cliffs were well defended; the 1,500-strong garrison from the 302nd Static Infantry Division comprised the Infantry Regiments 570, 571 and 572, each of two battalions, the 302nd Artillery Regiment, the 302nd Reconnaissance Battalion, the 302nd Anti-tank Battalion, the 302nd Engineer Battalion and 302nd Signal Battalion. They were deployed along the beaches of Dieppe and the neighbouring towns, covering all the likely landing places. The city and port were protected by heavy artillery on the main approach (particularly in the myriad cliff caves) and with a reserve at the rear. The defenders were stationed in the towns and in intervening open areas and highlands that overlooked the beaches. Elements of the 571st Infantry Regiment defended the Dieppe radar station near Pourville and the artillery battery over the Scie river at Varengeville. To the east, the Infantry Regiment 570 was deployed near the artillery battery at Berneval-le-Grand.

On 10 August 1942, Oberstgeneral Curt Haase of the 15th Army (whose section included Dieppe) issued an order to his men warning: "The information in our hands makes it clear that the Anglo-Americans will be forced in spite of themselves by the wretched predicament of the Russians to undertake some operations in the West in the near future. Soldiers, you must realize that it will be a very sticky business! Bombs and naval guns, sea weapons and commandos, assault craft and parachutists, airborne troops and hostile citizens, sabotage and murder will have to be coped with. Steady nerves will be required if we are not to go under. Fear does not exist! When the hail of fire pours down upon you, you must wipe your eyes and ears, clutch your weapons harder and defend yourselves as never before! THEM or US! That must be our watchword! The German Army has in the past received all kinds of tasks from the Führer and has always carried them out. The Army will carry out this task too. My soldiers, you will not fail! I have looked into your eyes! You are German men! You will willingly and bravely do your duty! Do this and you will remain victorious! Long our people and our Fatherland! Long live our Führer Adolf Hitler!" Generalmajor Konrad Haase of the 302nd Division summoned all of his officers to his divisional headquarters where he had them all publicly take an oath promising to fight to death to defend their positions at Dieppe and he himself vowed that he "would rather die than retreat or surrender". Based on his knowledge of the tides, Haase ordered his division to stay on the highest state of alert until 19 August 1942.

==== Luftwaffe ====
The Luftwaffe fighter force comprised Jagdgeschwader 2 (JG2) and Jagdgeschwader 26 (JG26), with about 120 serviceable fighters, mostly Fw 190s to oppose the landings and escort around 100 serviceable bombers of Kampfgeschwader 2 and the specialist anti-shipping bombers of III./Kampfgeschwader 53 (KG 53), II./Kampfgeschwader 40 (KG 40) and I./Kampfgeschwader 77 (KG 77) mostly equipped with Dornier 217s.

== Battle ==
On the night of 18/19 August, RAF Coastal Command carried out anti-surface vessel patrols of the coast from Boulogne to Cherbourg; after sunrise the patrols were carried out by fighters. The Allied fleet left the south coast of England during the night, preceded by minesweepers from Newhaven clearing paths through the English Channel, followed by the flotilla of eight destroyers and accompanying Motor Gun Boats escorting the landing craft and Motor Launches.

=== Initial landings ===
The initial landings began at 04:50 on 19 August, with attacks on the artillery batteries on the flanks of the main landing area. These were Varengeville – Sainte-Marguerite-sur-Mer (known as Orange Beach) by No. 4 Commando, Pourville (Green Beach) by the South Saskatchewan Regiment and the Queen's Own Cameron Highlanders of Canada, Puys (Blue Beach) by the Royal Regiment of Canada, and Berneval (Yellow Beach) by No. 3 Commando. On their way in, the landing craft and escorts heading towards Puys and Berneval ran into and exchanged fire with a small German convoy at 03:48. The Allied destroyers HMS Brocklesby and ORP Ślązak noticed the engagement, but their commanders incorrectly assumed that the landing craft had come under fire from the shore batteries and did not come to their rescue.

=== Yellow beach ===
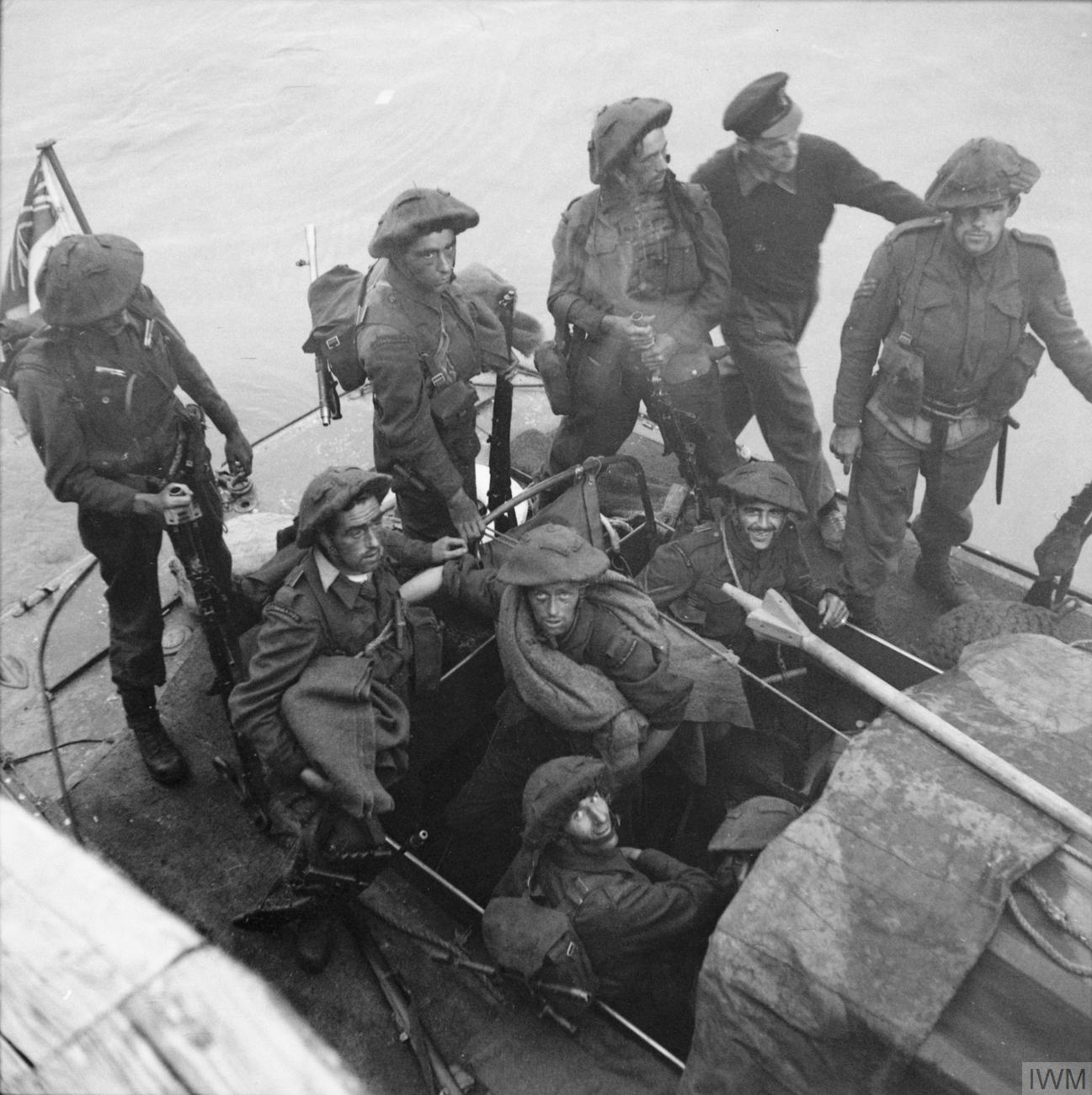
Unlike No. 4 Commando, No. 3 wore steel helmets during the raid

The mission for Lieutenant Colonel John Durnford-Slater and No. 3 Commando was to conduct two landings 8 mi (13 km) east of Dieppe to silence the coastal battery Goebbels near Berneval. The battery could fire upon the landing at Dieppe 4 mi (6.4 km) to the west. The three 170 mm (6.7 in) and four 105 mm (4.1 in) guns of 2/770 Batterie had to be out of action by the time the main force approached the main beach.

The craft carrying No. 3 Commando, approaching the coast to the east, were not warned of the approach of a German coastal convoy that had been located by British "Chain Home" radar stations at 21:30. German S-boats escorting a German tanker torpedoed some of the LCP landing craft and disabled the escorting Steam Gun Boat 5. Subsequently, ML 346 (commanded by Lt. A.D. Fear RNVR DSC) and Landing Craft Flak 1 combined to drive off the German boats but the group was dispersed, with some losses. The commandos from six craft who did land on Yellow I were beaten back and, unable to safely retreat or join the main force, had to surrender. Only 18 commandos under the command of Major Peter Young got ashore on Yellow II beach. They reached the perimeter of the battery via Berneval, after it was attacked by Hurricane fighter-bombers, engaging their target with small arms fire. Although unable to destroy the guns, their sniping for a time managed to distract the battery to such good effect that the gunners fired wildly and there was no known instance of this battery sinking any of the assault convoy ships off Dieppe. The commandos were eventually forced to withdraw in the face of superior enemy forces (aboard ML346), and was effected with such haste that Major Young was unable to board the ship: he was towed part of the way to port, in the water, clinging to a line tied to ML 346's stern.

=== Orange beach ===
The mission for Lieutenant Colonel Lord Lovat and No. 4 Commando (including 50 United States Army Rangers) was to conduct two landings 6 mi (9.7 km) west of Dieppe to neutralise the coastal battery Hess at Blancmesnil-Sainte-Marguerite near Varengeville. Landing on the right flank in force at 04:50, they climbed the steep slope and attacked and neutralised their target, the artillery battery of six 150 mm guns. This was the only success of Operation Jubilee. The commando then withdrew at 07:30 as planned. Most of No. 4 safely returned to England. This portion of the raid was considered a model for future amphibious Royal Marine Commando assaults as part of major landing operations. Lord Lovat was awarded the Distinguished Service Order for his part in the raid and Captain Patrick Porteous No. 4 Commando, was awarded the Victoria Cross.

=== Blue beach ===
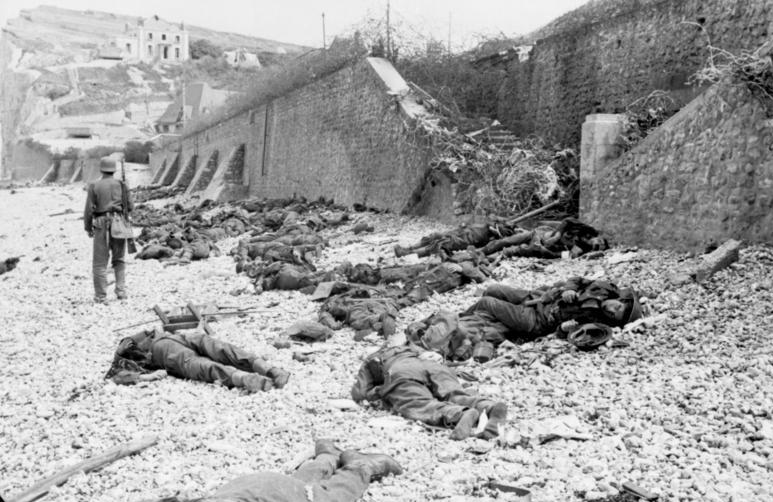
Canadian dead on Blue beach at Puys.

The naval engagement between the small German convoy and the craft carrying No. 3 Commando had alerted the German defenders at Blue beach. The landing near Puys by the Royal Regiment of Canada plus three platoons from the Black Watch of Canada and an artillery detachment were tasked to neutralise machine gun and artillery batteries protecting this Dieppe beach. They were delayed by 20 minutes and the smoke screens that should have hidden their assault had already lifted. The advantages of surprise and darkness were thus lost, while the Germans had manned their defensive positions in preparation for the landings. The well-fortified German forces held the Canadian forces that did land on the beach. As soon as they reached the shore, the Canadians found themselves pinned against the seawall, unable to advance. With a German bunker placed to sweep along the back of the seawall, the Royal Regiment of Canada was annihilated. Of the 556 men in the regiment, 200 were killed and 264 captured.

=== Green Beach ===
On Green beach at the same time that No. 4 Commando had landed at Orange Beach, the South Saskatchewan Regiment's 1st Battalion was headed towards Pourville. They beached at 04:52, without having been detected. The battalion managed to leave their landing craft before the Germans could open fire. However, on the way in, some of the landing craft had drifted off course and most of the battalion found themselves west of the River Scie rather than east of it. Because they had been landed in the wrong place, the battalion, whose objective was the hills east of the village and the Hindenburg Battery artillery, had to enter Pourville to cross the river by the only bridge. Before the Saskatchewans managed to reach the bridge, the Germans had positioned machine guns and anti-tank guns there which stopped their advance. With the battalion's dead and wounded piling up on the bridge, Lieutenant Colonel Charles Merritt, the commanding officer, attempted to give the attack impetus by repeatedly and openly crossing the bridge, in order to demonstrate that it was feasible to do so. However, despite the assault resuming, the South Saskatchewans and the Queen's Own Cameron Highlanders of Canada, who had landed beside them, were unable to reach their target. While the Camerons did manage to penetrate further inland than any other troops that day, they were also soon forced back as German reinforcements rushed to the scene. Both battalions suffered more losses as they withdrew; only 341 men were able to reach the landing craft and embark, and the rest were left to surrender. For his part in the battle, Lieutenant Colonel Merritt was awarded the Victoria Cross.

==== Pourville radar station ====
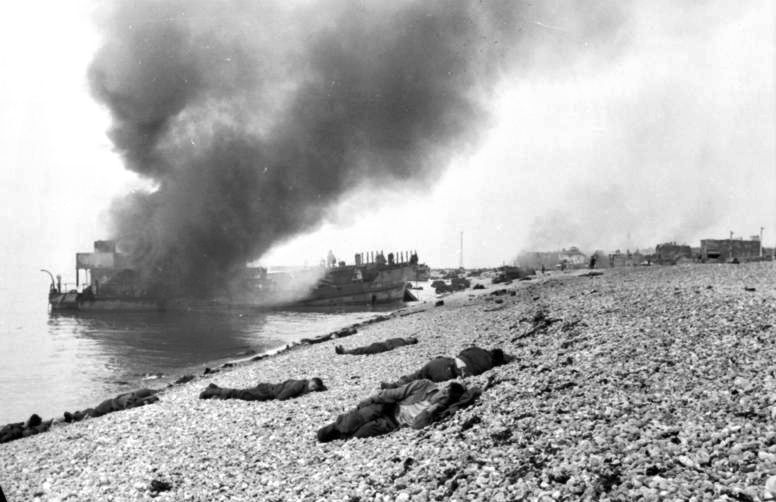
Landing craft on fire, Canadian POWs pose dead in the foreground for German propaganda. A concrete gun emplacement on the right covers the beach; the steep gradient can clearly be seen.

One of the objectives of the Dieppe Raid was to discover the importance and performance of a German radar station on the cliff-top to the east of the town of Pourville. To achieve this, RAF Flight Sergeant Jack Nissenthall, a radar specialist, was attached to the South Saskatchewan Regiment landing at Green Beach. He was to attempt to enter the radar station and learn its secrets, accompanied by a small unit of 11 men of the Saskatchewans as bodyguards. Nissenthall volunteered for the mission fully aware that, due to the highly sensitive nature of his knowledge of Allied radar technology, his Saskatchewan bodyguard unit was under orders to kill him to prevent him from being captured. He also carried a cyanide pill as a last resort.

After the war, Lord Mountbatten said to author James Leasor, when being interviewed during research for the book Green Beach, that "If I had been aware of the orders given to the escort to shoot him rather than let him be captured, I would have cancelled them immediately". Nissenthall and his bodyguards failed to overcome the radar station defences but Nissenthall was able to crawl up to the rear of the station under enemy fire and cut all telephone wires leading to it. The operators inside resorted to radio to talk to their commanders which was intercepted by listening posts on the south coast of England. The Allies were able to learn a great deal about the improved accuracy, location, capacity and density of German radar stations along the Channel coast which helped to convince Allied commanders of the importance of developing radar jamming technology. Only Nissenthall and one South Saskatchewan of the party returned to England.

=== Main Canadian landings ===
==== Red and White Beaches ====
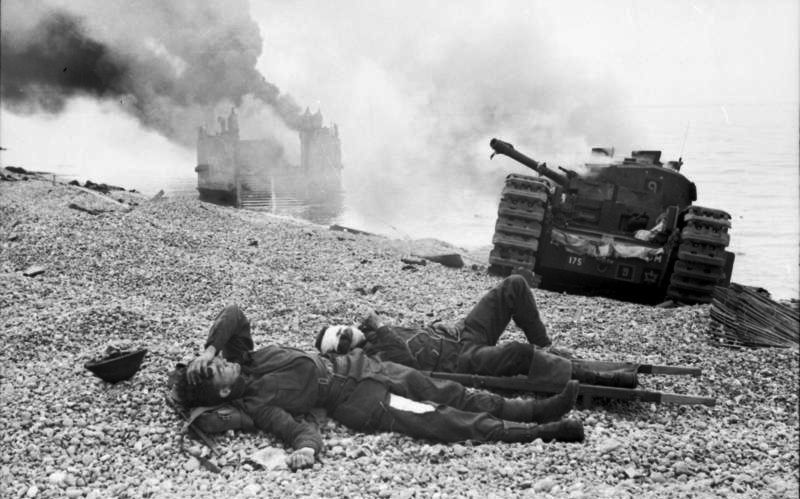
Canadian wounded and abandoned Churchill tanks after the raid. A landing craft is on fire in the background.

Preparing the ground for the main landings, four destroyers were bombarding the coast as landing craft approached. At 05:15, they were joined by five RAF Hurricane squadrons who bombed the coastal defences and set a smokescreen to protect the assault troops. Between 03:30, and 03:40, 30 minutes after the initial landings, the main frontal assault by The Essex Scottish Regiment and the Royal Hamilton Light Infantry started.

These infantry were meant to be supported by Churchill tanks of the 14th Army Tank Regiment landing at the same time, but the tanks arrived on the beach late. As a result, the two infantry battalions had to begin their attack without armour support. They were met with heavy machine-gun fire from emplacements dug into the overlooking cliffs. Unable to clear the obstacles and scale the seawall, they suffered heavy losses.

Captain Denis Whitaker of the Royal Hamilton Light Infantry recalled a scene of absolute carnage and confusion, with soldiers being cut down by German fire all along the sea wall while his commanding officer, Colonel Bob Labatt, desperately tried to use a broken radio to contact General Roberts while ignoring his men. Whitaker recalled: "When I got to the wall, I knelt down behind it to catch my breath and figure out what to do next. A German fired at me with a machine gun, the bullets passing underneath my stomach and in front of my head. I got out of there in a hurry and on to my objective. I shouted, 'We can't stay here because they're going to mortar the hell out of this beach.' The place is in the shape of a saucer. Christ, they were firing at us from behind as well as the front and both sides."

When the tanks did arrive, only 29 attempted to land. Two of those sank in deep water, and 12 more became bogged down in the soft shingle beach. Only 15 of the tanks made it up to and across the seawall. Once they crossed the seawall, they were confronted by a series of tank obstacles that prevented their entry into the town. Blocked from going further, they were forced to return to the beach where they provided fire support for the now retreating infantry. Several Churchills had their tracks broken by German fire, but none had its armour penetrated while fighting. Two were penetrated after being abandoned by their crews, possibly by anti-tank guns moved to close range. No tanks returned to England and all the crews that landed were either killed or captured.

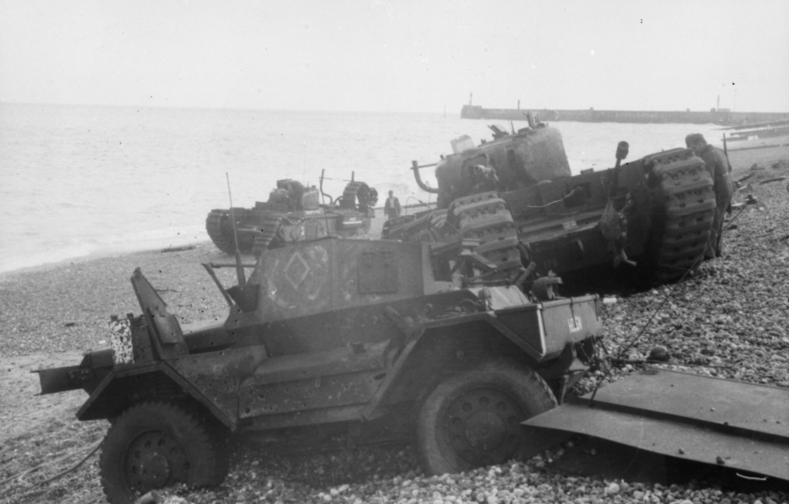
Daimler Dingo armoured car and two Churchill tanks bogged down on the shingle beach. The nearer Churchill tank has a flame thrower mounted in the hull, and the rear tank has lost a track. Both have attachments to heighten their exhausts for wading through the surf.

Unaware of the situation on the beaches because of a smoke screen laid by the supporting destroyers, Major General Roberts sent in the two reserve units: the Fusiliers Mont-Royal and the Royal Marines. At 07:00, the Fusiliers under the command of Lieutenant Colonel Dollard Ménard in 26 landing craft sailed towards their beach. They were heavily engaged by the Germans, who hit them with heavy machine gun, mortar and grenade fire, and destroyed them; only a few men managed to reach the town. Those men were then sent in towards the centre of Dieppe and became pinned down under the cliffs and Roberts ordered the Royal Marines to land in order to support them.

Not being prepared to support the Fusiliers, the Royal Marines had to transfer from their gunboats and motorboat transports onto landing craft. The Royal Marine landing craft were heavily engaged on their way in with many destroyed or disabled. Those Royal Marines that did reach the shore were either killed or captured. As he became aware of the situation the Royal Marine commanding officer Lieutenant Colonel Phillipps, stood upon the stern of his landing craft and signalled for the rest of his men to turn back. He was killed a few moments later.

During the raid, a mortar platoon from the Calgary Highlanders, commanded by Lieutenant F. J. Reynolds, was attached to the landing force but stayed offshore after the tanks on board (code-named Bert and Bill) landed. Sergeants Lyster and Pittaway were Mentioned in Despatches for their part in shooting down two German aircraft and one officer of the battalion was killed while ashore with a brigade headquarters.

At 09:40, under heavy fire, the withdrawal from the main landing beaches began and was completed by 14:00.

=== Air operations ===
At 04:16 six Bostons attacked German coastal artillery in the twilight which led to the results not being observed. Soon afterwards 14 Bostons flew to Dieppe to drop smoke bombs around the German guns on the eastern heights, bombing the Bismarck batteries between 05:09 and 05:44 with a hundred and fifty 100 lb (45 kg) smoke bombs at 50–70 ft (15–21 m), flying through a storm of anti-aircraft fire. A smoke screen 800–1,000 yd (730–910 m) drifted 4–5 mi (6.4–8.0 km) seawards, thickened by the smoke of a burning field of wheat. Six Bristol Blenheim bombers from 13 Squadron and one from 614 Squadron dropped 100 lb (45 kg) phosphorus bombs south of German FlaK sites. Nine of the twelve Bostons were damaged, two crashed on landing and one Blenheim smoke-layer from 614 Squadron was damaged and the pilot wounded, the aircraft crashing on landing and bursting into flames. Just before 08:00 two squadrons of cannon-armed Hurricanes were ordered to attack E-boats coming from Boulogne; they were accompanied by two fighter cover squadrons.

The airfield at Abbeville-Drucat was attacked by 24 Boeing B-17 Flying Fortresses, escorted by four squadrons of USAAF Spitfire IXs at 10:30 putting it out of action for "two vital hours". After the attack, a wing of Typhoons made a feint towards Ostend. The Mustangs reconnoitred outside the main area looking for reinforcements on the roads to Dieppe and from Amiens, Rouen, Yvetot and Le Havre. Flying from RAF Gatwick, they contacted the HQ ship then, having flown a sortie, passed information to the HQ ship before returning to Gatwick and phoning report to the air commander. Reconnaissance sorties were stopped after 12:00. Although taken by surprise, the German fighters soon began to attack the air umbrella. The RAF was moderately successful in protecting the ground and sea forces from aerial bombing but were hampered by operating far from their home bases. Spitfires were at the limit of their range, with some only being able to spend five minutes over the combat area.

As more German aircraft appeared, the number of British aircraft over Dieppe was increased from three to six squadrons and at times up to nine squadrons were present.

Six squadrons (four British, two Canadian) flew the Spitfire Mk IX, the only British fighter equal to the Fw 190, on its operational debut at Dieppe. During the battle, Fighter Command flew 2,500 sorties over Dieppe. The plan to centralise information gleaned from German radar, W/T and R/T and other transmissions failed because the Luftwaffe operation against the landing overwhelmed the reporting system and the war room at 11 Group HQ was overwhelmed with reports as the Luftwaffe reaction increased. RAF Kingsdown was not informed about developments and failed to identify German fighter reinforcements arriving from all over France and the Low Countries. The new 6IS Fish party, to decrypt high-speed non-Morse transmissions via the German Geheimschreiber, had no time to prepare and missed important information. Despite the failures of control and intelligence, the air umbrella prevented the Luftwaffe from making many attacks on the landing or the evacuation of the Allied force.

== Aftermath ==
=== Analyses ===
==== German ====
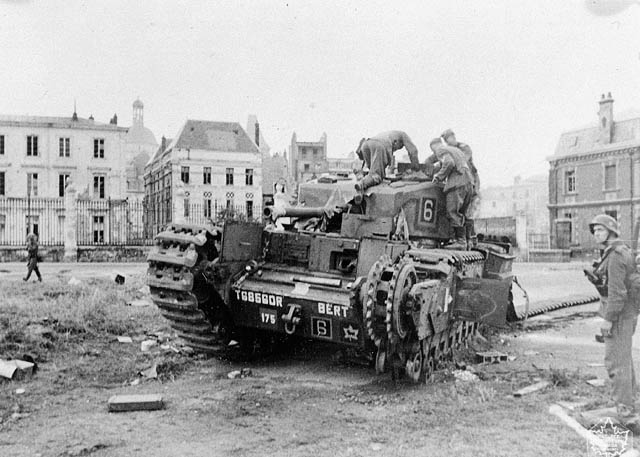
German soldiers examine a Churchill tank at Dieppe

The capture of a copy of the Dieppe plan allowed the Germans to analyse the operation. Rundstedt criticised the plan's rigidity, saying that "the plan is in German terms not a plan, it is more a position paper or the intended course of an exercise." Other senior German officers were equally unimpressed; General Konrad Haase considered it "incomprehensible" that a division was expected to overrun a German regiment that was supported by artillery, "...the strength of naval and air forces was entirely insufficient to suppress the defenders during the landings". General Adolf-Friedrich Kuntzen could not understand why the Pourville landings were not reinforced with tanks where they might have succeeded in leaving the beach. The Germans were unimpressed by the Churchill tanks left behind; the armament and armour were compared unfavourably with that used in German and Soviet tanks.

The Luftwaffe was pleased with how it had performed during the air battle. One report judged the Fw 190, which formed the bulk of the air defence, to be 'in every way suitable as a fighter-bomber'. It ascribed its good performance despite its marked numerical inferiority to the "aggressiveness and better training of the German fighter pilots". The Luftwaffe had been so active during the battle that only 70 of the 230 airframes available at the start of the day were combat ready by day's end. The Luftwaffe had consumed all its 20mm cannon ammunition available in the West, so much so that there was not enough for routine flight operations in the next couple of days.

The Germans were pleased with their successful defence whilst noting faults in their own communications, transport and location of support forces but recognised that the Allies were certain to learn some lessons from the operation and set about improving the fixed defences. As the overall theatre commander in the West, Rundstedt was adamant that the Germans must learn Dieppe's lessons. He was anxious that the Germans were not left behind in learning from Dieppe: "Just as we have gained the most valuable experience from the day of Dieppe, the enemy has learnt as well. Just as we evaluate the experience for the future, so will the enemy. Perhaps he will do this to an even greater extent because he has paid so dearly for it".

The Dieppe raid also provoked longer-term strategic decisions. In October, Hitler's high command produced a "Memorandum Regarding Experiences in Coastal Defence", which was provoked in large part by Dieppe. This document provided a framework for German commanders to plan coastal defence in the future. It laid down, amongst other principles, that air superiority was the key to a successful coastal defence strategy.

==== Allied ====
Dieppe became a textbook example of "what not to do" in amphibious operations and laid the framework for the Normandy landings two years later. Dieppe showed the need for

1. Preliminary artillery support, including aerial bombardment
2. Surprise
3. Proper intelligence concerning enemy fortifications
4. Avoidance of a frontal attack on a defended port
5. Proper re-embarkation craft

While the Canadian contingent fought boldly in the face of a determined enemy, it was ultimately circumstances outside their control which sealed their fate. Despite criticism concerning the inexperience of the Canadian brigades, scholars have noted that even seasoned professionals would have been hard-pressed under the deplorable conditions brought about by their superiors. The commanders who planned the raid on Dieppe had not envisaged such losses. This was one of the first attempts by the Western Allies on a German-held port city. As a consequence, planning from the highest ranks in preparation for the raid was minimal. Basic strategic and tactical errors were made which resulted in a higher than expected Allied death rate.

To help future landings, the British would develop specialist armoured vehicles for engineers to perform tasks protected by armour. Because the tracks of most of the Churchill tanks were caught up in the shingle beach, the Allies began to study beach geology where they intended to land and adapting vehicles for them. The Allies changed their view that capturing a major port was necessary to establish a second front; the damage inflicted on a port to capture it and by the Germans firing demolition charges would make it useless afterwards. Prefabricated Mulberry harbours were to be built and towed to beaches during the invasion.

While the RAF were generally able to keep German aircraft from the land battle and the ships, the operation demonstrated the need for air superiority as well as showing "major deficiencies in RAF ground support techniques" and this led to the creation of an integrated tactical air force for army support. On 21 December 1942, Churchill wrote in a memo to Hastings Ismay, the Cabinet Military Secretary, where he stated "although for many reasons everyone was concerned to make this business look as good as possible, the time has now come when I must be informed more precisely about the military plans". Churchill was highly critical of the Operation Jubilee plans, writing "it would appear to a layman very much out of accord with the accepted principles of war to attack the strongly fortified town front without first securing the cliffs on either side and to use our tanks in a frontal assault on the beaches". Ismay's reply, dated 29 December 1942, included a detailed report written by Mountbatten which completely acquitted himself of any responsibility for flaws in the Operation Jubilee plan and largely blamed Montgomery who as GOC of Southeastern Command "was the senior Army Officer concerned with the Raid from about the end of April onwards".

Myths

Preliminary naval and aerial bombardments were already common strategy by the Allies. "There was a cursory examination in the Combined Report [...] which amounted to little more than statements of the obvious." The British used preliminary and aerial bombardments during Operation Ironclad, while the Americans used it during their landings at Guadalcanal.

The Churchill tanks did not get stuck on the beach. Many made it off only to be blocked by tank obstacles and due to the engineers being pinned down on the beach the tanks were unable to get through. The tank commanders then turned around and returned to the beach to act as cover for the infantry. "[...] Major Allan Glenn ordered all tanks able to move onto the beach to provide covering fire [...]".

The concept for the Mulberry Harbours were "well developed" before the Dieppe Raid. "Hugh-Hallet is often credited with proposing the "mulberrie" [...] but he himself said they were Churchill's idea, posed months before Dieppe."

The real lessons that helped secure victory for the Allies on D-Day were the landings conducted during Operations Torch, Husky, Avalanche and at Tarawa. These landings helped the D-Day planners to better move logistics and come up with weapons and strategies to combat heavily fortified positions.

=== Casualties ===
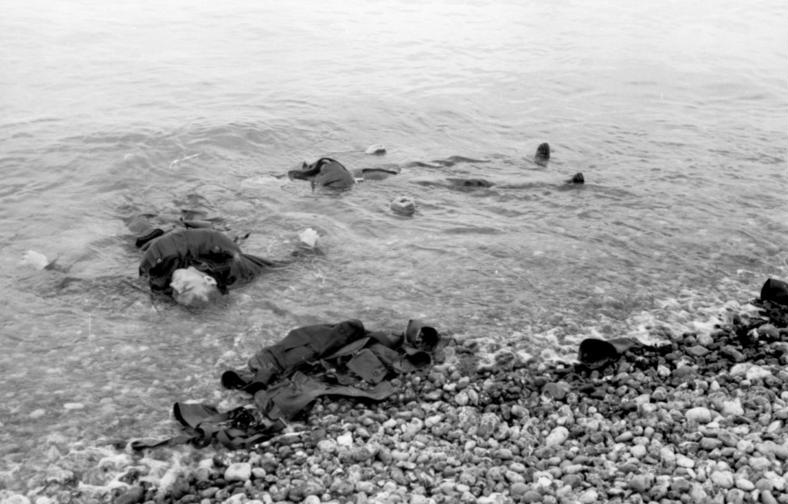
Canadian dead at Dieppe, August 1942

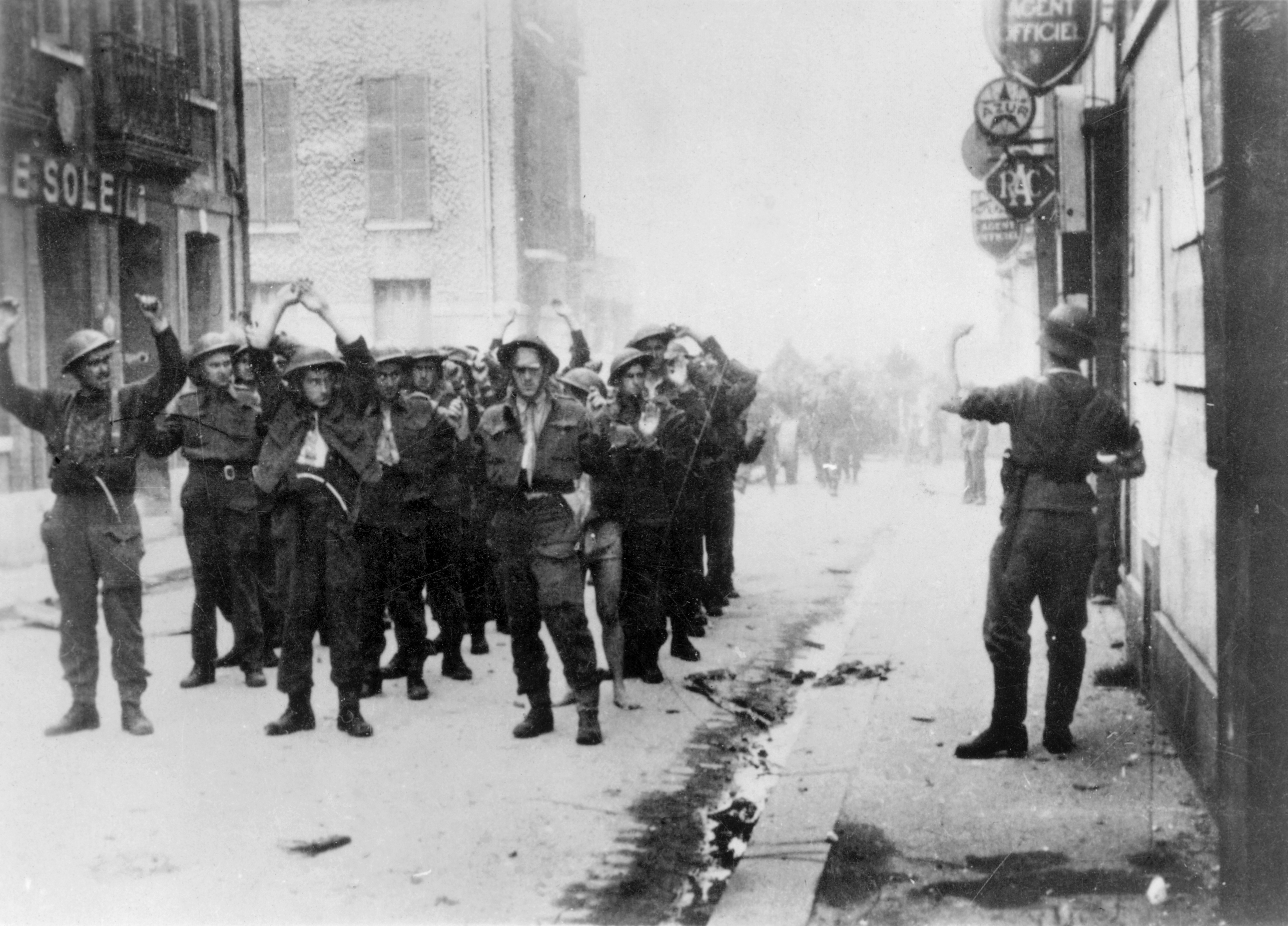
Canadian prisoners being led away through Dieppe after the raid. Credit: Library and Archives Canada / C-014171

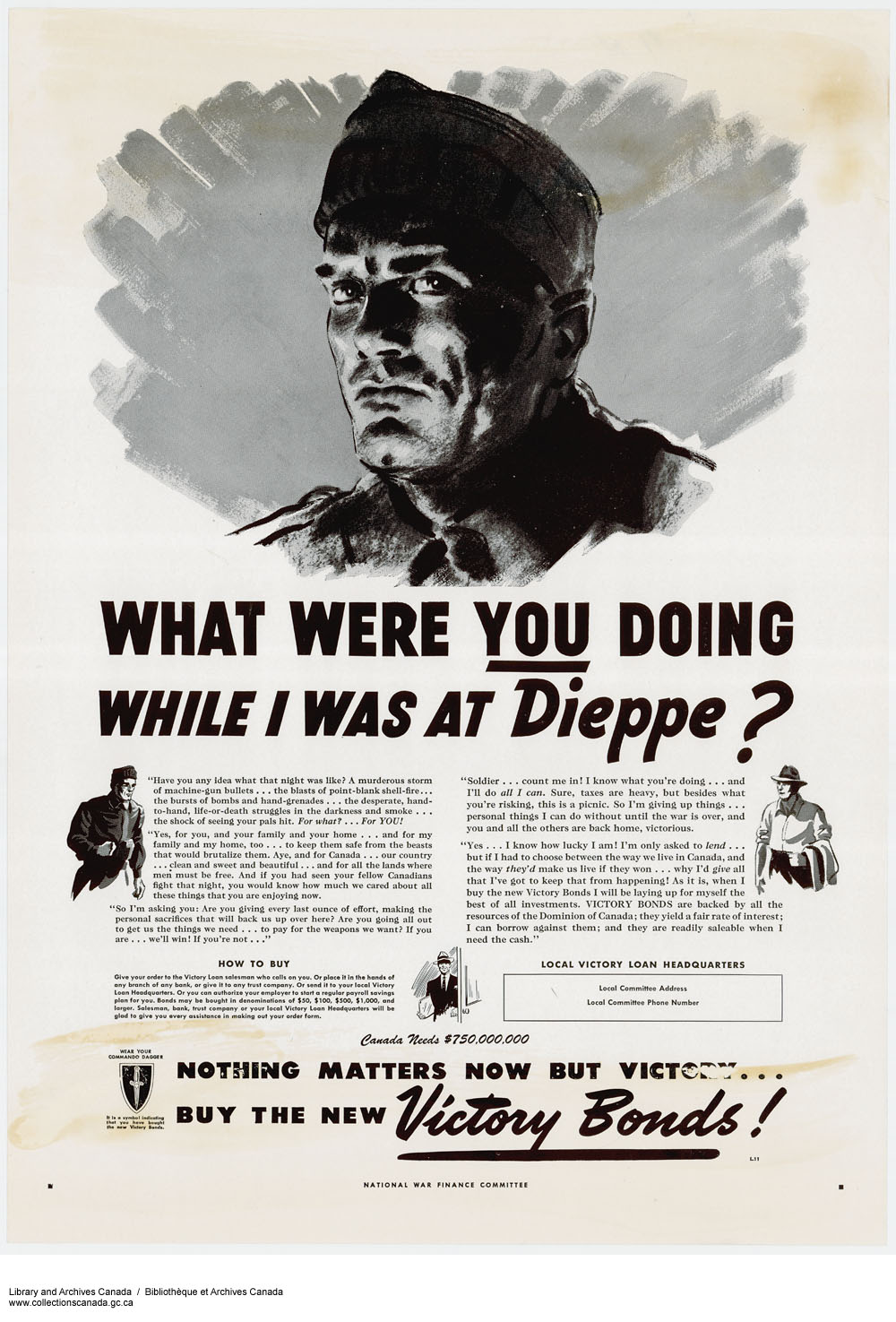
Canadian advertisement for Victory Bonds

Of the nearly 5,000-strong Canadian contingent, 3,367 were killed, wounded or taken prisoner, an exceptional casualty rate of 68 per cent. The 1,000 British Commandos lost 247 men. The Royal Navy lost the destroyer Berkeley (on the return crossing, it was hit by bombs from a Fw 190 and then scuttled by HMS Albrighton) and 33 landing craft, suffering 550 dead and wounded. The RAF lost 106 aircraft. RAF Air Sea Rescue Services picked up around 20 pilots at the loss of three of Dover's five High Speed Launches. Among the RAF losses, six RAF aircraft had been shot down by gunners on their own side, one Typhoon was shot down by a Spitfire and two others were lost when their tails broke off (a structural problem with early Typhoons), and two Spitfires collided during the withdrawal across the Channel.

The British historian Robin Neillands wrote that the Canadian regiments that took part in the raid were virtually destroyed. The Essex Scottish regiment had a 90% casualty rate as only 52 men out of the 553 men of the Essex Scottish who landed at Dieppe beach returned to England safely with the rest all killed, wounded or captured; the Fusiliers Mont-Royal regiment had 459 out of the 584 men who landed becoming casualties; and the Royal Hamilton Light Infantry regiment had 372 casualties out of the 582 men who landed with half of the survivors who returned to England being seriously wounded. Of the 31 officers of the Fusiliers Mont-Royal who landed at Dieppe, 27 were casualties, a loss that was especially crippling because of a shortage of French-Canadian officers. Other regiments who landed elsewhere suffered similarly with the Royal Regiment of Canada which landed at Blue Beach having a 94% casualty rate, while the South Saskatchewan Regiment and the Cameron Highlanders regiment who landed at Pourville had 685 casualties out of the combined 1,065 men who landed.

The Germans suffered 591 casualties, 322 fatal and 280 wounded, 48 aircraft and one patrol boat. Of the 50 US Army Rangers serving in Commando units, six were killed, seven wounded and four captured.

The losses at Dieppe were said to be a necessary evil. Mountbatten later justified the raid by arguing that lessons learnt at Dieppe in 1942 were put to good use later in the war. He later said, "I have no doubt that the Battle of Normandy was won on the beaches of Dieppe. For every man who died in Dieppe, at least 10 more must have been spared in Normandy in 1944." Half a century later, the only Briton to earn a VC from the raid, Patrick Porteous criticized Mountbatten's notion that valuable lessons were learned at Dieppe, "Absolute nonsense. We could have learned as much in Weymouth Bay". In direct response to the raid on Dieppe, Churchill remarked that "My Impression of 'Jubilee' is that the results fully justified the heavy cost" and that it "was a Canadian contribution of the greatest significance to final victory."

To others, especially Canadians, it was a major disaster. The exception was the success gained by the battle-hardened British commandos against the coast artillery batteries near Varengeville. Of the nearly 5,000 Canadian soldiers, more than 900 were killed (about 18 per cent) and 1,874 taken prisoner (37%). General Denis Whitaker of the Royal Hamilton Light Infantry who fought as a captain at Dieppe in a 1989 interview stated: "The defeat cleared out all the dead weight. It was the best thing that ever happed to the regiment."

=== German propaganda ===
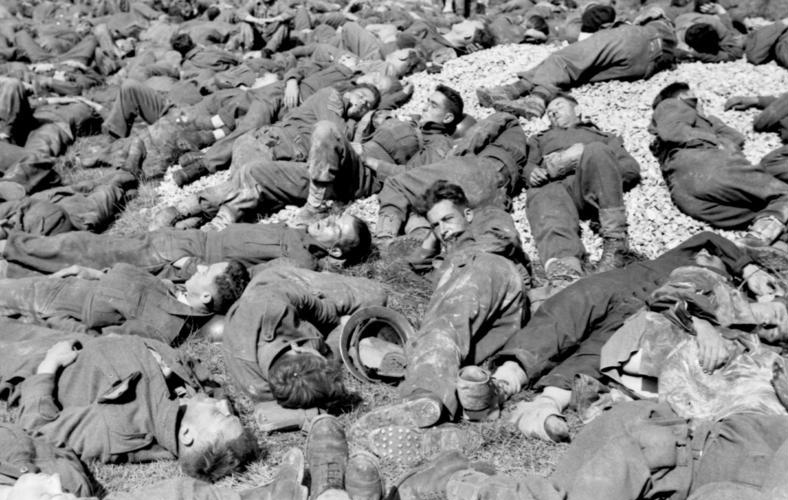
British and Canadian prisoners resting at Dieppe, August 1942

Dieppe was a German propaganda coup in which the Dieppe raid was described as a military joke, noting the amount of time needed to plan such an attack, combined with the losses suffered by the Allies, pointed only to incompetence. German Propaganda Minister Joseph Goebbels and his press chief Otto Dietrich oversaw a propaganda campaign which sought to highlight the raid's failure as a sign of German strength and also to reassure the German domestic population that they need not worry about an attack in the West while most German forces were committed in the East.

Many of the photos taken by the Germans were staged with either POWs posing as dead bodies or removing German dead. The propaganda value of German news on the raid was enhanced by British foot-dragging, Allied media being forced to carry announcements from German sources. These attempts were made to rally the morale of the German people despite the growing intensity of the Allied strategic bombing campaign on German cities, and large daily casualties on the Eastern Front.

Marshal Philippe Pétain of France wrote a letter of congratulation to the German Army for "cleansing French soil of the invader" of this "most recent British aggression". Pétain suggested that French troops be allowed to serve with German coastal garrisons; this suggestion was not viewed with enthusiasm by the German Army and nothing came of it. The letter was given much publicity in Germany and France as a sign of how the French people allegedly appreciated Germany's efforts to defend them from les Anglo-Saxons. Pétain's letter was later used as an exhibit for the prosecution at his trial for high treason in 1945.

=== The air battle ===
Fighter Command stated it had inflicted many losses on the Luftwaffe for an RAF loss of 106 aircraft, 88 fighters (including 44 Spitfires), 10 reconnaissance aircraft and eight bombers; 14 other RAF aircraft were struck off charge from other causes such as accidents. Other sources suggest that up to 28 bombers were lost and that the figure for destroyed and damaged Spitfires was 70. The Luftwaffe suffered 48 aircraft losses, 28 bombers, half of them Dornier Do 217s from KG 2; JG 2 lost 14 Fw 190s and eight pilots killed, JG 26 lost six Fw 190s with their pilots. The RAF lost 91 aircraft shot down and 64 pilots; 47 killed and 17 taken prisoner, the RCAF lost 14 aircraft and nine pilots and 2 Group lost six bombers. (Note: Leigh-Mallory reported losses of 70 pilots and 10 crew killed or missing; aircraft destroyed as 88 fighters, 10 Army Cooperation aircraft, one from 2 Group and seven of the smoke laying aircraft.) Leigh-Mallory considered the losses "remarkably light in view of the number of Squadrons taking part and the intensity of the fighting" noting that the tactical reconnaissance suffered heaviest with about two casualties per squadron. The Luftwaffe in France was back to full strength within days of the raid. The Canadian historian Terry Copp wrote that Dieppe failed to inflict the knockout blow against the Luftwaffe that the RAF sought. For the rest of 1942, the output of fighters by the United States, Britain, and Canada, combined with better Allied pilot training, led to the Luftwaffe gradually losing the war of attrition in the skies above France. Copp concluded that "the battle for air superiority was won on many fronts by continuous effort and Aug. 19, 1942, was part of that achievement." The Forward Air Controller, Air Commodore Adrian Cole, was injured when Calpe was attacked and was awarded the DSO for gallantry.

Leigh-Mallory considered the Dieppe a huge success as it finally forced the Luftwaffe to fight a major air battle on the French coast and on 22 August 1942 wrote to Mountbatten demanding another such raid as the best way to trigger another air battle like the one fought over Dieppe. Citing the fact that it was standard German policy to assume that any attempt to seize a French port was the start of an invasion, Leigh-Mallory stated it was simply a mere matter of landing troops on the French coastline somewhere near a port as the best way of triggering decisive air battles that would, he argued, lead to "the destruction of the Luftwaffe". Leigh-Mallory was apparently ignorant of the fact that the Luftwaffe had changed its policy after Dieppe once the Germans discovered that Operation Jubilee was a raid rather than an invasion. The general feeling within the Luftwaffe was it had "over-reacted" to the Dieppe raid by throwing most of the Luftwaffe fighter squadrons in northern France into battle in a place that favored the Allied aircraft, and henceforward if the Allies landed in France again, the policy was to wait and see if the action was a raid or an invasion. Mountbatten approved Leigh-Mallory's request, but was prevented by a shortage of landing craft from carrying it out. The plans of Leigh-Mallory and Mountbatten for more such raids also encountered massive opposition from the War Office and the British Army which objected to the use of British and Canadian soldiers as essentially bait to bring out the Luftwaffe. In March 1943, one British Army brigadier wrote bitterly that in the RAF "there was a school of thought which considers Dieppe a howling success because we were able to bring the GAF [German Air Force] into the air and shoot down 200 German aircraft at the expense of 100 of our own (plus of course 5,000 odd good soldiers)".

=== Prisoners of war ===
Canadian Brigadier William Wallace Southam brought ashore his copy of the assault plan, which was classified as a secret document. Southam tried to bury the copy under pebbles when he surrendered, but was spotted doing so by German forces who retrieved it. The plan, later criticised by senior German commanders including Rundstedt for its size and complexity, contained orders to shackle prisoners. The Special Service Brigade tied the hands of prisoners taken on raids and the practice had been ordered for the Dieppe Raid "to prevent destruction of their documents". Roberts had objected to this with Mountbatten.

After capturing Southam's plan, the Germans threatened on 2 September to shackle Allied prisoners captured at Dieppe. The War Office announced that if an order existed it would be rescinded and the Germans withdrew the threat on 3 September. On 7 October, the Germans revived the controversy after more information emerged about the Dieppe Raid and Operation Basalt on 4 October, in which German prisoners captured on Sark were alleged to have been tied. British and Canadian prisoners of war were tied in reprisal on 8 October, which led to counter reprisals. Supposed violations of the Geneva Convention committed by Allied commandos against German prisoners of war at Dieppe and Sark was cited by Hitler in his Commando Order of October 1942, which instructed German forces to summarily execute all Allied commandos they captured.

=== Civilians ===
Civilians were handed leaflets by the Canadians telling them it was only a raid and not to get involved; despite this a small number of civilians provided help to the wounded and later passed clothing and food to Canadian prisoners. Civilians also volunteered to help collect and bury the Canadian fallen, including the 475 washed ashore. Hitler decided to reward the town for not helping in the raid by freeing French POWs from Dieppe and Berlin radio announced the release of 750 "sons of Dieppe" imprisoned since 1940. For the town residents' "perfect discipline and calm", although the residents had not had much time to furnish the invaders with an instant fifth column, Hitler gave the town a gift of Fr 10 million, to repair the damage caused during the raid.

=== German preparedness ===
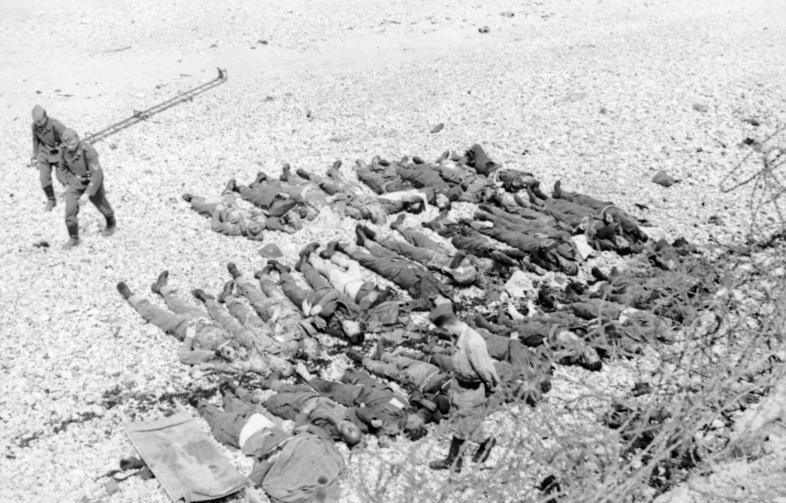
Canadian and British dead at Dieppe, August 1942

The fiasco has led to a discussion of whether the Germans knew of the raid in advance. Since June 1942, the BBC had been broadcasting warnings to French civilians of a "likely" action, urging them to quickly evacuate the Atlantic coastal districts. Indeed, on the day of the raid itself, the BBC announced it, albeit at 08:00, after the landings had taken place.

First-hand accounts and memoirs of many Canadian veterans who documented their experiences on the shores of Dieppe remark about the preparedness of the German defences as if they were warned. On touching down on the Dieppe shore, the landing ships were immediately shelled with the utmost precision as troops disembarked. Commanding officer Lt Colonel Labatt testified to having seen markers on the beach used for mortar practice, which appeared to have been recently placed.

The belief that the Germans were forewarned has been strengthened by accounts of German and Allied POWs. Major C. E. Page, while interrogating a German soldier, found out that four machine-gun battalions were brought in "specifically" in anticipation of a raid. There are numerous accounts of interrogated German prisoners, German captors and French citizens who all conveyed to Canadians that the Germans had been preparing for the landing for weeks.

Much of the belief that the Germans had been forewarned was due to the 1942 film The Next of Kin, which had been made mandatory viewing to British and Canadian forces starting with the film's release in May 1942. The plot of The Next of Kin featured a commando raid into France very much like the Dieppe raid that was sabotaged by a German spy operating in Britain who was able to learn of the raid beforehand due to sloppy security. In the immediate aftermath of the Dieppe raid, many of the Canadian soldiers who survived the raid cited The Next of Kin as evidence that there had been a German spy who learned the secrets of Operation Jubilee.

Captain Stephen Roskill, Britain's official naval historian, wrote an article for the prestigious Royal United Services Institution arguing the opposite case in 1964. Roskill's article relied on German documentary evidence to show that any warnings of an Allied raid on Dieppe were purely coincidental.

In his 2023 study of the battle from the German point of view, James Shelley concluded that there was no evidence to support the view that the Germans had any specific intelligence that a raid was planned against Dieppe.

The German convoy that bumped into the Allied ships failed to get messages to shore due to damage to their radio aerials in the fire fight; however, the operator of the long range Freya 28 (Radar) at Pourville correctly identified five columns of stationary ships at 03:45 at a range of 35 km. An alert was given to the Navy command who did not believe the warning, but when the ships started to head to shore a further warning was given at 04:35. Troops along the coast had heard gun fire out to sea and some units went to alert. It was 05:05 before German orders came from Le Havre for artillery to open fire. Within an hour the extent of the attack was being understood by German command and reserves were notified to prepare to move to the coast.

==== Daily Telegraph crossword controversy ====
On 17 August 1942, the clue "French port (6)" appeared in the Daily Telegraph crossword (compiled by Leonard Dawe), followed by the solution, "Dieppe"; the raid on Dieppe took place the next day, on 19 August. The War Office suspected that the crossword had been used to pass intelligence to the Germans and called upon Lord Tweedsmuir, (Note: Son of the novelist John Buchan, former Governor General of Canada) a senior intelligence officer attached to the Canadian Army, to investigate. Tweedsmuir later said, "We noticed that the crossword contained the word 'Dieppe', and there was an immediate and exhaustive inquiry which also involved MI5. But in the end, it was concluded that it was just a remarkable coincidence – a complete fluke".

A similar crossword coincidence occurred in May 1944, prior to D-Day. Multiple terms associated with Operation Overlord (including the word "Overlord") appeared in the Daily Telegraph crossword (also written by Dawe) and after another investigation by MI5, it was concluded that it was another coincidence. Further to this, a former student identified that Dawe frequently requested words from his students, many of whom were children in the same area as US military personnel.

=== The Hinge of Fate ===
In 1950, Churchill was writing The Hinge of Fate, the fourth volume of his memoirs/history entitled The Second World War. The Hinge of Fate covered the events from January 1942 to June 1943. On 2 August 1950, Churchill sent Hastings Ismay (who was now serving as a researcher and a ghostwriter for Churchill's book series) a memo where he noted that the original plan for a raid on Dieppe codenamed Operation Rutter had been cancelled on 7 July 1942 and that Montgomery had advised against relaunching it. Churchill noted that Operation Rutter was launched under the new codename of Operation Jubilee on 19 August 1942, a decision that he did not remember approving at the time. Churchill wrote to Ismay that he wanted to know "who took the decision to revive the attack after it had been abandoned and Montgomery had cleared out". In particular, Churchill wanted to know "...what the facts were – namely: did the Chiefs of Staff, or the Defence Committee or the War Cabinet ever consider the matter of the revival of the operation [a] when I was in England, [b] when I was out of England, or was it all pushed through by Dickie Mountbatten on his own without reference to higher authority?". Churchill's references to being out of England in August 1942 were to his summit with Joseph Stalin in Moscow followed up by a lengthy trip to the Middle East.

On 14 August 1950, Ismay wrote back to Churchill saying he could not answer his questions because there was a complete lacuna in the documentary record. In an attempt to excuse the absence of any documentary record, Ismay added "in the vital interests of secrecy nothing was put on paper. Indeed, I can now recall the fury of General Nye then V.C.I.G.S [Brooke was with Churchill on a visit to Egypt in August 1942 and Nye was serving as the acting CIGS] who had no idea that the operation was on until reports started to flow in from the scene of the action". Ismay concluded that Churchill must had given his approval to Jubilee, but that there were no records to either confirm or deny that assertion. Ismay stated he consulted Mountbatten's deputy, Admiral John Hughes-Hallett, who remembered discussing the plan for a raid on Dieppe with Churchill sometime in the summer of 1942, but Hughes-Hallett was not certain if that was before Operation Rutter was cancelled or after. In the early drafts of The Hinge of Fate, Churchill wrote that it was Mountbatten who revived the plan for raiding Dieppe and that there was "no written record of the revived plan being further examined nor of any decision to launch it being taken by the Chiefs of Staff or the Defence Committee of the War Cabinet". Churchill's draft strongly implied that Mountbatten had launched Operation Jubilee on his own authority and complained that there was no record of the Jubilee plan ever being examined by the Chiefs of Staff or the Defence Committee, which he felt was a failure of the system as he believed that either body might have pointed out the flaws in the Operation Jubilee plan. He wrote that because he was abroad on visits to the Soviet Union and Egypt in August 1942 that he was unaware of the Operation Jubilee plan and would have submitted it to the Chiefs of Staff for review had he been in Britain that August. Churchill added that the Dieppe raid caused much shock and grief in Canada "whose gallant men had suffered such devastating losses" and that the 2nd Canadian Infantry Division "lost seventy percent of the five thousand embarked".

On 1 September 1950, Churchill submitted his draft to Mountbatten, who objected strenuously to what was written and demanded that it be rewritten. Mountbatten objected to publishing the memo of 29 December 1942 written by Ismay which in turn quoted from his memo in where he blamed Montgomery, wrongly saying it would violate copyright laws (the memos were government property and were held in Crown copyright, meaning neither Ismay nor Mountbatten held any copyright). Mountbatten also objected to the statement that 70% of the Canadian 2nd Division became casualties under the grounds that only 18% of the 5,000 men who landed at Dieppe were killed, writing that this was "the most pessimistic possible view to take and surely not one which our side should stress". About Mountbatten's way of calculating casualties, the British historian David Reynolds noted that listing all of the dead, wounded and those taken prisoner is the normal way of counting casualties and if one counts in all those Canadian killed, wounded or taken prisoner then 2nd Division did indeed suffer a 70% casualty rate at Dieppe instead of a 18% rate. Mountbatten also demanded that Churchill delete all the references to the Chiefs of Staff not giving approval to Operation Jubilee and asserted that the Chiefs of Staff had given "verbal approval" with the absence of a documentary record being due to reasons of security. Mountbatten also wanted all references to the wave of grief that swept Canada after Dieppe removed under the grounds that mentioning that ordinary Canadians were thrown into the deepest despair as a result of an operation he had launched was libelous and injurious to his reputation. Finally, Mountbatten demanded that Churchill write that he had informed him personally about the plan for Operation Jubilee sometime in the summer of 1942 with the absence of a documentary record again being explained away by reasons of security, adding that it was not his fault that Churchill could not remember the alleged meeting. Ismay wrote to Churchill in support of Mountbatten that "I admit – with shame – that I have no recollection of the meetings that he had with you on the question of remounting Dieppe, but I am sure, having regard in the weight of evidence that his story is substantially correct". Ismay also asked that Churchill not include his minute of 21 December 1942 where he criticised the Jubilee plan in The Hinge of Fate, saying that Mountbatten did not want it published. Churchill largely gave in to Mountbatten and rewrote his account of the Dieppe raid in the manner that Mountbatten had wanted. The final published version in The Hinge of Fate omitted any mention of the immense wave of sorrow and sadness in Canada caused by the raid, changed the 2nd Division from suffering a 70% casualty rate to having 18% killed, and praised the raid as a "costly, but unfruitful reconnaissance in force" and stated there was "honour to the brave who fell. Their sacrifice was not in vain".

Reynolds wrote it remains unclear if the Dieppe raid was an "unauthorised action" or not. The anger expressed by General Nye, the acting CIGS in August 1942, strongly supports the conclusion that Mountbatten had launched the raid without informing the Chiefs of Staff in advance. However, this may not have been a case of Mountbatten exceeding his authority as revised procedures no longer required Mountbatten to obtain authority to relaunch a cancelled raid, and the plan for Operation Rutter had been approved by the Chiefs of Staff on 13 May 1942. Regardless if the raid was an "unauthorised action" or not, it is clear it was primarily Mountbatten who was responsible for the decision to go ahead with the raid on 19 August 1942. Reynolds noted that Churchill was the one most responsible for Mountbatten's rise, writing that it was "thanks to him that this egregious social climber had been so absurdly over-promoted. Mountbatten was a mere forty-one with previous experience only of destroyers, and lacked the clout to obtain the essential support from the Navy and the RAF. He probably pressed on with the flawed plan because the only way to consolidate his fragile position was by inflicting dramatic damage on Hitler's Fortress Europe. That is what the Prime Minister asked him to do. Whether or not there had been meetings or records, Mountbatten was basically following the brief he had been given. When Churchill dropped his post-mortem in September 1950, lack of time and energy were probably only part of the reason. It was not prudent for him to examine the Dieppe raid too closely – like many events in that dark tunnel between the surrender of Singapore and the victory at Alamein".

=== The Enigma pinch ===
Research undertaken over a 15-year period by military historian David O'Keefe uncovered 100,000 pages of classified British military archival files that documented a "pinch" mission overseen by Ian Fleming (best known later as author of the James Bond novels), as the main purpose of the Dieppe Raid. O'Keefe states that No. 30 Commando was sent to Dieppe to capture one of the new German 4-rotor Enigma code machines, plus associated codebooks and rotor setting sheets. The Naval Intelligence Division (NID) planned the "pinch" to pass such items to cryptanalysts at Bletchley Park to assist with Ultra decryption operations. According to O'Keefe the presence of other troops landing at Dieppe was to provide support and create a distraction for the commando units ordered to reach the German admiralty headquarters and capture the Enigma machine; they were a cover for the Enigma target.

No. 30 Commando was formed, as the Special Intelligence Unit, in September 1942 (a month after the raid), composed of 33 (Royal Marines) Troop, 34 (Army) Troop, 35 (RAF) Troop and 36 (Royal Navy) Troop. It was later renamed 30 RN Commando (Special Engineering Unit). Later research identified the unit in the Dieppe raid as No. 3 Troop of No. 10 (Inter-Allied) Commando, known as the X-Troop.

In August 2017, naval historian Eric Grove described 'Enigma Pinch' as "more a reflection of the contemporary fascination with secret intelligence rather than the reality of 1942." Obtaining useful intelligence was among the objectives – including the capture of a four-rotor Enigma cipher machine but it was one of many objectives. Grove concludes that the Dieppe Raid was not, as stated, cover for a 'snatch' and also recognises that the decision to form the Intelligence Assault Units to gather intelligence material was not made until after Operation Jubilee had been ordered.

Leah Garret in her 2021 book X-Troop: The Secret Jewish Commandos of World War Two, found new evidence to support O'Keefe's conclusion that Dieppe was a cover for a pinch on naval headquarters. A British unit was created made up of anti-Nazi Germans who had fled the Sudetenland; a five-man team from X Troop was to break into the Enigma machine's room at Dieppe and take the machine and code books. (German speakers were needed to identify the relevant code documents, and possibly, to interrogate prisoners taken.) Garret found a formerly classified after-action report written by "Maurice Latimer", the Anglicised name of the one Sudeten German who returned from the mission, who reported that his orders were "to proceed immediately to German General HQ in Dieppe to pick up all documents, etc of value, including, if possible, a new German respirator" (almost certainly a code word referring to the Enigma machine). The mission failed, with one member killed, another seriously wounded, and two taken prisoner.

== Commemoration ==
Commemorative window
Location	Sir Arthur Currie Hall, Royal Military College of Canada, Kingston, Ontario
Date	1968
Description	1 light Dieppe Dawn
Manufacturer	Robert McCausland Limited
Inscription	In memory of Dieppe Dawn 19 August 1942 by classes of 1948–52

=== Dieppe War Cemetery ===
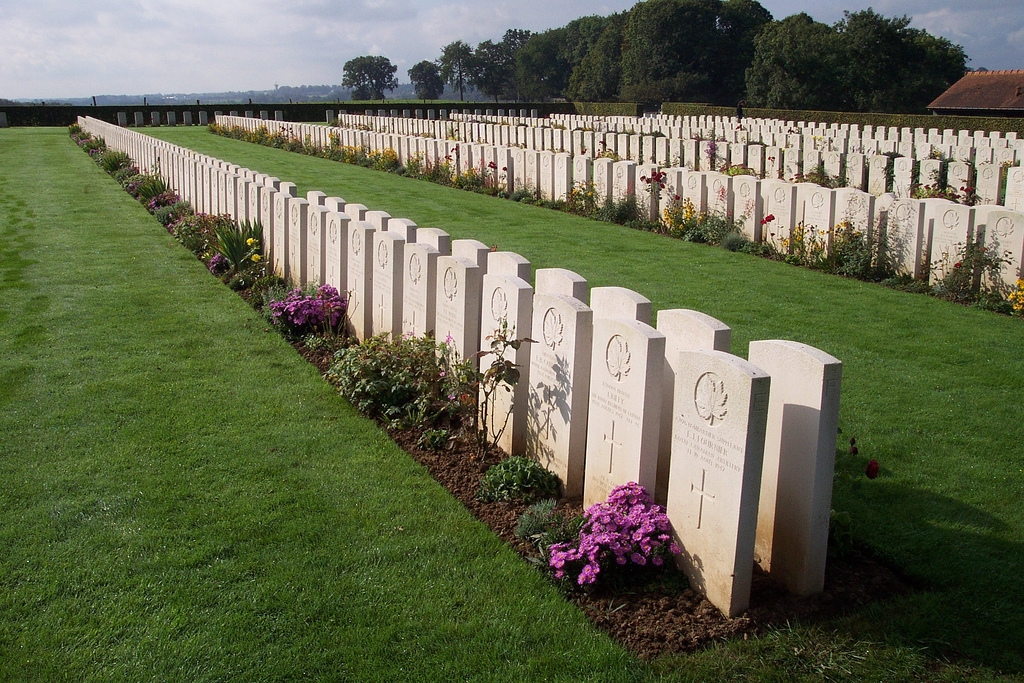
The current grave markers in the Dieppe Canadian War Cemetery

Allied dead were initially buried in a mass grave but at the insistence of the German Army Graves Commission the bodies were reburied at a site used by a British hospital in 1939 in Vertus Wood on the edge of the town. The Dieppe Canadian War Cemetery headstones have been placed back-to-back in double rows, the norm for a German war cemetery but unusual for Commonwealth War Graves Commission sites. When the Allies liberated Dieppe as part of Operation Fusilade in 1944, the grave markers were replaced with standard CWGC headstones but the layout was left unchanged to avoid disturbing the remains.

=== Honours and awards ===
Three Victoria Crosses were awarded for the operation: one to Captain Patrick Porteous, Royal Regiment of Artillery attached to No. 4 Commando, in the British forces; and two to Canadians – the Reverend John Weir Foote, padre to the Royal Hamilton Light Infantry and LCol Charles Merritt of the South Saskatchewan Regiment.

Porteous was severely wounded in the battle but was evacuated at the end of the battle; both Foote and Merritt were captured and became prisoners of war, although in the instance of Foote, he deliberately abandoned his landing craft and chose to be captured so that he could minister to his fellow Canadians who were now POWs.

Marcel Lambert of the 14th Army Tank Regiment (The Calgary Regiment (Tank)), fought aggressively in the battle and was captured. He, along with all the participants in the raid, was awarded a "certificate" from the Government of France. In the 1980s the Government of Canada issued to all raid veterans a "volunteer service medal."

Despite the failure of the operation, Major General Roberts was awarded the Distinguished Service Order. Among the enlisted personnel, Private William A. Haggard of the South Saskatchewan Regiment was awarded the Distinguished Conduct Medal, and subsequently, field promoted to lieutenant, for his actions during the raid.

A Canadian signalman, Sergeant David Lloyd Hart, was awarded the Military Medal for his efforts during the raid. Hart maintained what became the sole line of radio communications between the men ashore and the commanders out at sea. He is credited with saving the lives of 100 men through his signals work, being able to order their retreat. Hart later became the longest-serving officer in the Canadian Armed Forces, serving in active and honorary roles for 81 years. He died in March 2019, aged 101.

U.S. Army Ranger Corporal Frank Koons became the first American soldier in the Second World War to receive a British award for bravery in action, a Military Medal.

== See also ==
- Beach Comber, a famous war pigeon that was highly decorated for his role in the Dieppe Raid.
- Operation Jubilee order of battle for all units involved.
- Dieppe, a Canadian television miniseries that dramatised the events leading up to Operation Jubilee.
