= 302nd Infantry Division (Wehrmacht) =

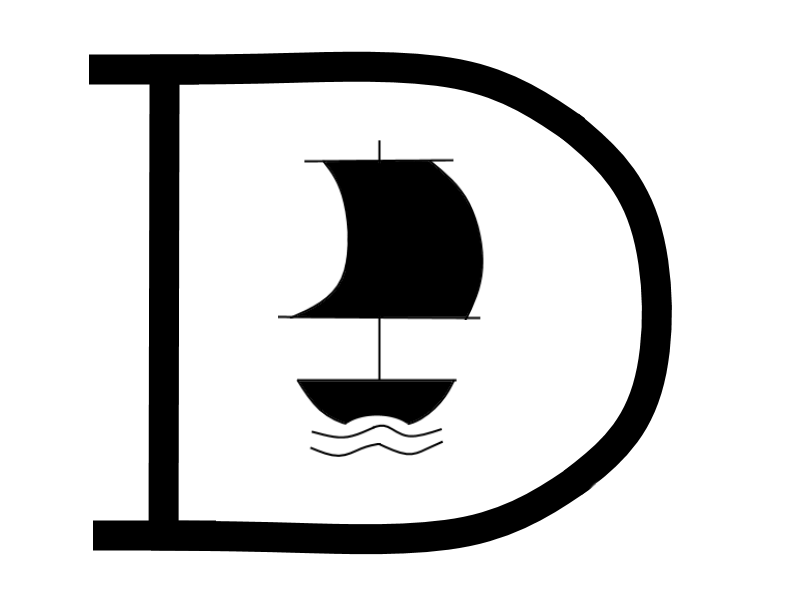
- Active: November 1940 – August 1944
- Country: Nazi Germany
- Branch: Army
- Type: Static infantry; Infantry
- Size: Division
- Garrison/HQ: Neustrelitz, Germany
- Nickname: "Dieppe Division"
- Engagements: World War II: Dieppe Raid; Eastern Front; Third Battle of Kharkov; Dnieper–Carpathian Offensive

Commanders
- 15 Nov 1940 – 26 Nov 1942: Generalleutnant Konrad Haase
- 26 Nov 1942 – 12 Nov 1943: Generalleutnant Otto Elfeldt
- 12 Nov 1943 – 25 Jan 1944: Generalleutnant Karl Rüdiger
- 25 Jan – Jul 1944: Generalleutnant Erich von Bogen
- Jul - 25 Aug 1944: Oberst Wilhelm Fischer

The 302nd Infantry Division (German: 302. Infanteriedivision), initially formed as the 302nd Static Infantry Division, was a German Army infantry division in World War II.

== History ==
The division was raised in November 1940 from men in Military District II as the 302nd Static Infantry Division (German: 302. (Bodenständige) Infanterie Division) and was initially used as a French-occupying force, with some elements remaining in Germany. According to Hauptmann Joachim Lindner: 'Day after day nothing.'

=== Dieppe raid ===
An Allied amphibious raid, to determine if a large landing could be attempted, was made at Dieppe, France on 19 August 1942. The Allies suffered heavy losses with men and tanks strewn over the beach along with landing craft. The operation painted a grim picture for any future Allied incursion. A German major observed, 'I have not witnessed images more terrible. In one landing craft the entire crew of about forty men had been wiped out by a direct hit. On the water we could see bits of wrecks, ships in ruins, corpses floating and soldiers wrestling with death. In Paris there was jubilation. The enemy's operation was smashed in just over nine hours!'

Over 6,000 troops landed at Dieppe (mainly Canadians) and less than 2,500 of them succeeded in returning to Britain afterwards. The Germans suffered a coastal battery damaged, 48 Luftwaffe planes destroyed, and approximately 600 casualties.

This first combat led to the division being nicknamed the "Dieppe division". In October 1942 the division was reorganized as the 302nd Infantry Division, with improved mobility and offensive capabilities. After a few additional months serving as a reserve in France, it was transferred to the Eastern Front in early 1943 to help shore up the line after the German defeat in the Battle of Stalingrad.

=== Actions in the Eastern front ===
In January 1943, the division was sent to the Eastern Front to aid in the Kharkov offensive, where it fought in Luhansk (then known as Voroshilovgrad). Between April and September the division switched to defensive tactics along the Mius-Front. It defended the Ukrainian city of Zaporizhia between October and December before withdrawing to the Nikopol bridgehead, where General Rüdiger was wounded-in-action. The division retreated west to the Dnieper in April. Rüdiger's replacement, General von Bogen, was captured by Soviet troops during May 1944 in Bessarabia. Colonel Fischer, the 302nd Artillery Regiment's commander, took his place. The division met its end on 25 August 1944 when the Soviets succeeded in encircling it during its withdrawal from the Dniester. During the encirclement Fischer was wounded and soon after captured.

=== Aftermath ===
Decimated during the Dnieper–Carpathian Offensive, the division was disbanded and those few survivors were transferred to the 15th and 75th Infantry Divisions.

== Elements ==
1940

- 570th Infantry Regiment
- 571st Infantry Regiment
- 572nd Infantry Regiment
- 302nd Artillery Regiment
- 302nd Anti-tank Battalion
- 302nd Reconnaissance Battalion
- 302nd Engineer Battalion
- 302nd Supply Battalion
- 302nd Divisional Supply detachment

1943

- 570th Infantry Regiment
- 571st Infantry Regiment
- 572nd Infantry Regiment
- 302nd Artillery Regiment
- 302nd Mobile Battalion
- 302nd Bicycle unit
- 302nd Engineer Battalion
- 302nd Intelligence Department
- 302nd Infantry Division supply troops
- 302nd Medical Company
- 302nd Ambulance Train

1944

- 570th Grenadier Regiment
- 572nd Grenadier Regiment
- Division Group 125
  - Regiment Group 420
- Regiment Group 421
- 302nd Divisional fusilier battalion
- 302nd Artillery Regiment
- 302nd Mobile Battalion
- 302nd Engineer Battalion
- 302nd Field Replacement Battalion
- 302nd Intelligence Department
- 302nd Infantry Division Supply Troops
- 302nd Medical Company
- 302nd Ambulance train

== See also ==
- Dieppe Raid
- Operation Jubilee order of battle
- Division (military)
- Military unit
- List of German divisions in World War II
- Heer
- Wehrmacht

== Bibliography ==
- "302. Infanterie-Division". German language article. Retrieved April 9, 2005.
- Hargreaves, Richard (2006). “The Germans in Normandy”, Pen and Sword, ISBN 1-84415-447-5.
