= Konrad Haase =

German WW2 general

- Born: 29 August 1888; Dresden, Germany
- Died: 25 January 1963 (aged 74); Hahnstätten, West Germany
- Military career
- Allegiance: German Empire; Nazi Germany
- Service years: 1908–1920; 1935–1945
- Rank: Generalleutnant
- Nickname: "Der kleine Haase" ('The Little Haase')
- Commands: 164th Infantry Division; 365th Infantry Division; 302nd Infantry Division
- Conflicts: World War I; World War II Dieppe Raid Eastern Front Italian Campaign
- Awards: German Cross in Silver; War Merit Cross 1st Class with Swords

Konrad Ludwig Benno Haase (29 August 1888 – 25 January 1963) was a German general during World War II. He is primarily known for being in command of the 302nd Infantry Division when it successfully defended against the Dieppe Raid.

== Early career ==
Haase joined the Imperial German Army as an artillery officer cadet in 1908, gaining his commission as a second lieutenant a year later. The First World War brought promotion to captain and an Iron Cross 1st Class, but he was not one of the select few officers who were retained in the Weimar Republic’s new army, restricted to 100,000 men under the terms of the Treaty of Versailles. Haase became a police officer in 1919, becoming Dresden’s chief of police five years later.

Haase was recalled to Army service in Adolf Hitler’s new Wehrmacht in 1935 as a regimental commander. In late 1939, Haase was assigned to command the 164th Infantry Division while it was being formed in Germany. He was given command of the short-lived 365th Division in late 1940 for Polish occupation duties, by which time he had been promoted to brigadier general. He was consequently recommended for another divisional command. On 12 November 1940, he transferred to 302nd Infantry Division to serve as its commanding officer during its creation in north eastern Germany. He received his final promotion to major general (Generalleutnant) on New Year’s Day 1942, and was simultaneously awarded the War Merit Cross 1st Class with Swords.

== Dieppe Raid ==
=== 302nd Infantry Division command ===
The 302nd Division was raised in November 1940.

=== During the raid ===
The German forces defending against the Dieppe Raid were part of the LXXXI Corps under General der Panzertruppen Adolf Kuntzen, in turn a part of the Fifteenth Army commanded by Generaloberst Curt Haase. The 302nd Infantry Division under Konrad Haase garrisoned Dieppe, 50 miles of coastline on either side of the town, and the area around the port; this was the unit that would defend against the raid. Division commander Konrad Haase was not related to army commander Curt Haase. To differentiate them, the German troops nicknamed Konrad "der kleine Haase" and Curt "der grosse Haase", which translate as "the little Haase" and "the big Haase" respectively.

=== Aftermath ===
After Haase's success in defeating Operation Jubilee during the Dieppe raid, Haase was congratulated in person by OB West, Field Marshal Gerd von Rundstedt and awarded a clasp to his Iron Cross 1st Class.

== Later life ==
When 302nd Division was upgraded and moved to the Eastern front, Haase was removed from command and spent the rest of the war in staff positions in the Soviet Union, France and Italy. He was taken prisoner at the end of the war and was released in 1947. He died in 1963 in West Germany.
