= HNoMS Eskdale =

Hunt-class destroyer

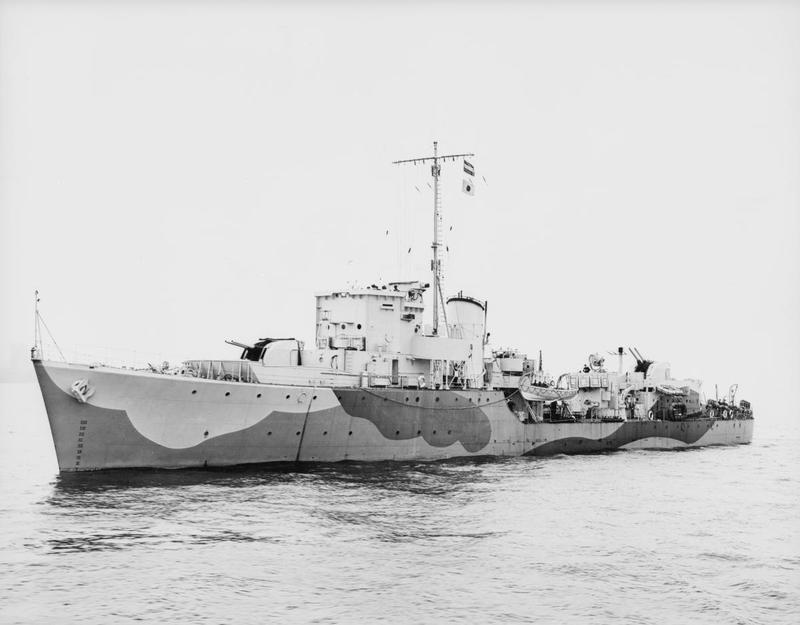
- HNoMS Eskdale

History

United Kingdom
- Name: Eskdale
- Namesake: Eskdale, Cumbria
- Ordered: 23 August 1940
- Builder: Cammell Laird shipyard
- Laid down: 18 January 1941
- Launched: 16 March 1942
- Commissioned: 20 July 1942
- Identification: L36
- Fate: Transferred to Norway, 20 July 1942

Norway
- Name: Eskdale
- Acquired: 20 July 1942
- Commissioned: 20 July 1942
- In service: 31 July 1942
- Fate: Sunk 14 April 1943

General characteristics
- Class & type: Hunt-class destroyer
- Displacement: 1,050 long tons (1,067 t)
- Length: 280 ft (85 m)
- Beam: 31 ft 6 in (9.60 m)
- Draft: 7 ft 9 in (2.36 m)
- Propulsion: 2 × steam turbines; 2 × shafts
- Speed: 27 kn (50 km/h; 31 mph)
- Complement: 155 officers and enlisted
- Armament: 4 × 4 in (100 mm) guns; 1 x 40 mm (1.6 in); 2 × 3 in (76 mm); 3 × 20 mm (0.79 in); 2 x 21 in (530 mm) torpedo tubes

HNoMS Eskdale (pennant number L36) was an British escort destroyer of the Type III Hunt class. The destroyer was built by Cammell Laird at their Birkenhead shipyard, in 1941–1942, being launched on 16 March 1942 and completed in July that year. Eskdale was allocated to the Royal Norwegian Navy, and carried out convoy escort and patrol duties in the English Channel and North Sea. The destroyer was sunk by German S-boats off Lizard Head in Cornwall on 14 April 1943.

== Construction and design ==
Eskdale was one of fifteen Type III Hunt-class destroyers ordered for the Royal Navy on 23 August 1940, as part of the 1940 War Emergency Programme, with 28 Type III Hunts ordered over the course of 1940. The Hunt class was meant to fill the Royal Navy's need for a large number of small destroyer-type vessels capable of convoy escort and operations with the fleet. The Type III Hunts differed from the previous Type II ships in replacing a twin 4-inch gun mount by two torpedo tubes to improve their ability to operate as destroyers.

The Type III Hunts were 264 feet 3 inches (80.54 m) long between perpendiculars and 280 feet (85.34 m) overall, with a beam was 31 feet 6 inches (9.60 m) and draught 7 feet 9 inches (2.36 m). Displacement was 1,050 long tons (1,070 t) standard and 1,490 long tons (1,510 t) under full load. Two Admiralty boilers raising steam at 300 pounds per square inch (2,100 kPa) and 620 °F (327 °C) fed Parsons single-reduction geared steam turbines that drove two propeller shafts, generating 19,000 shaft horsepower (14,000 kW) at 380 rpm. This gave a design maximum speed of 27 knots (50 km/h; 31 mph). 345 long tons (351 t) of oil fuel were carried, giving a range of 3,700 nautical miles (6,900 km; 4,300 mi) at 15 knots (28 km/h; 17 mph).

Main gun armament was four 4 inch (102 mm) QF Mk XVI dual purpose (anti-ship and anti-aircraft) guns in two twin mounts, with a quadruple 2-pounder "pom-pom" and three Oerlikon 20 mm cannon providing close-in anti-aircraft fire. Two 21-inch (533 mm) torpedo tubes were fitted in a single twin mount; two depth charge chutes, four depth charge throwers and 70 depth charges comprised the ship's anti-submarine armament. Type 291 and Type 285 radar was fitted, as was Type 128 sonar.

Eskdale was laid down at Cammell Laird, Birkenhead, shipyard on 18 January 1941, was launched on 16 March 1942 and completed on 31 July 1942.

== History ==
Eskdale was built for the Royal Navy in June 1942, it was agreed that it would be transferred to the Royal Norwegian Navy under operation of the Norwegian armed forces in exile, with the crew of the Norwegian-manned Town-class destroyer Newport, which was undergoing extensive repair after a collision, taking over the new destroyer and Newport returning to Royal Navy control on completion of the repairs. Eskdale commissioned on 20 July 1942.

Eskdale worked up at Scapa Flow and on 2 September 1942, Eskdale sailed as part of the escort for the Arctic convoy Convoy PQ 18 for the convoy's initial leg from Loch Ewe to Iceland. Eskdale then joined the 1st Destroyer Flotilla based at Portsmouth, taking part in convoy escort and patrols in the English Channel and North Sea, serving with the flotilla until the destroyer's sinking.

On the night of 13/14 October 1942, the German Navy attempted to run the commerce raider Komet westwards through the Channel from Le Havre, escorted by four torpedo boats. (Note: T4, T10, T14 and T19.) The British were aware of the German attempt and deployed two groups of ships to intercept the German force. One, consisting of Eskdale, the destroyers Cottesmore, Albrighton, Glaisdale and Quorn, followed by eight Motor Torpedo Boats (MTB) sailed from Dartmouth to patrol off Cap de la Hague, while a second group of four destroyers were to wait off the Channel Islands. The Motor Torpedo Boats became separated from the Eskdale group of destroyers, which spotted the convoy at about 01:00 on 14 October. The five destroyers took the convoy by surprise, setting Komet on fire and badly damaging T10, while the German defensive fire was ineffective, with fire from Komet hitting three of the German torpedo boats. MTB 236, which had lost contact with the other MTBs, spotted the battle, and torpedoed Komet at about 01:15 hr. Komet then blew up with the loss of all aboard. On the night of 12 December 1942, Eskdale, together with the destroyers Albrighton, Brocklesby, Vesper, Whitshed and Worcester, attacked a German convoy off Dieppe, with Eskdale torpedoing and sinking the German auxiliary minesweeper Sperrbrecher 144. Eskdale was hit in the bridge during this engagement, and had to be steered from the ship's emergency conning position at the aft end of the ship. Eskdale was under repair until 16 January 1943.

On 14 April 1943, Eskdale and Glaisdale, together with five trawlers, were escorting the six merchant ships of Convoy PW 323 (Portsmouth–Wales), when the convoy was attacked by seven German motor torpedo boats (known as Schnellboot to the Germans and E-boats to the British) off Lizard Head. Eskdale was sunk by torpedoes from S90, S65 and S121, killing 25 of the destroyer's crew, with the freighter Stanlake also torpedoed and sunk.
