= HMS Glaisdale =

British naval ship

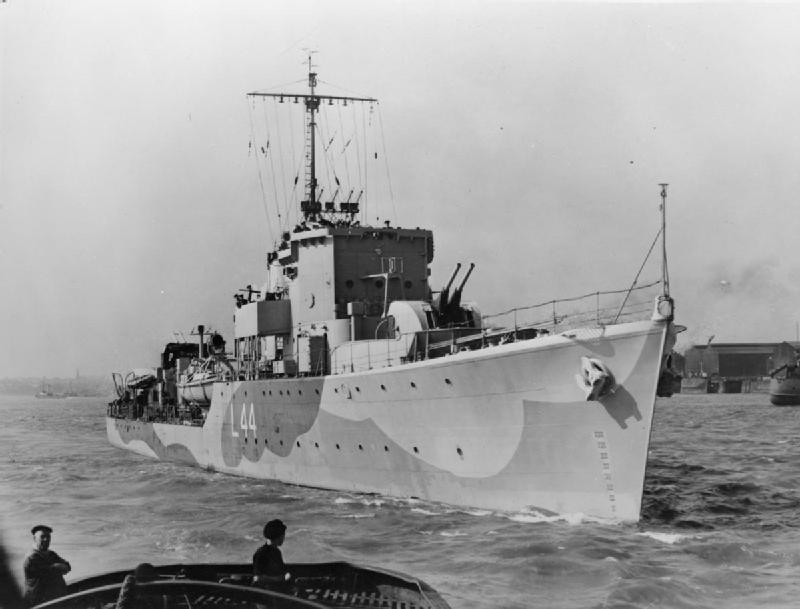

History

United Kingdom
- Name: HMS Glaisdale
- Ordered: 23 August 1940
- Builder: Cammell Laird, Birkenhead
- Laid down: 4 February 1941
- Launched: 5 January 1942
- Commissioned: 12 June 1942
- Identification: Pennant number: L27
- Fate: To Norway October 1946

History

Norway
- Name: Narvik
- Acquired: October 1946
- Stricken: 1 May 1961

General characteristics
- Class & type: Type III Hunt-class destroyer
- Displacement: 1,050 long tons (1,067 t) standard, 1,490 long tons (1,514 t) full load
- Length: 264 ft 3 in (80.54 m) pp, 280 ft (85.34 m) oa
- Beam: 31 ft 6 in (9.60 m)
- Draught: 7 ft 9 in (2.36 m)
- Propulsion: 2 Admiralty 3-drum boilers; 2 shaft Parsons geared turbines, 19,000 shp (14,000 kW)
- Speed: 27 kn (50 km/h; 31 mph)
- Range: 3,700 nmi (6,900 km; 4,300 mi) at 14 kn (26 km/h; 16 mph)
- Complement: 168
- Armament: 4 × QF 4 in Mark XVI guns on twin mounts Mk. XIX; 4 × QF 2 pdr Mk. VIII (1 × quad mount); 3 × 20 mm Oerlikons; 2 × 21 in (533 mm) torpedo tubes; 70 depth charges, 4 throwers, 2 racks

HMS Glaisdale was a Type III Hunt-class destroyer of the British Royal Navy that took part in the Second World War. The destroyer was built by Cammell Laird in Birkenhead in 1941 to 1942, completing in June 1942.

Glaisdale was loaned to the Royal Norwegian Navy during the Second World War, taking part in convoy escort and anti E-boat patrols in the English Channel. She took part in the Invasion of Normandy in June 1944, and was damaged by a mine on 23 June 1944, and as a result was laid up in reserve for the rest of the war. The ship was sold to Norway in 1946, and was renamed KMN Narvik. She remained in Nowregian service until 1961, when she was sold for scrap.

== Construction and design ==
The Hunt class was meant to fill the Royal Navy's need for a large number of small destroyer-type vessels capable of both convoy escort and operations with the fleet. The Type III Hunts differed from the previous Type II ships in replacing a twin 4-inch gun mount by two torpedo tubes to improve their ability to operate as destroyers. The Type III Hunts were 264 feet 3 inches (80.54 m) long between perpendiculars and 280 feet (85.34 m) overall, with a beam was 31 feet 6 inches (9.60 m) and draught 7 feet 9 inches (2.36 m). Displacement was 1,050 long tons (1,067 t) standard and 1,490 long tons (1,514 t) under full load. Two Admiralty boilers raising steam at 300 pounds per square inch (2,100 kPa) and 620 °F (327 °C) fed Parsons single-reduction geared steam turbines that drove two propeller shafts, generating 19,000 shaft horsepower (14,000 kW) at 380 rpm. This gave a design maximum speed of 27 knots (50 km/h; 31 mph). 345 long tons (351 t) of oil fuel were carried, giving a range of 3,700 nautical miles (6,900 km; 4,300 mi) at 15 knots (28 km/h; 17 mph). Type III Hunts had a complement of 168 officers and other ranks.

Main gun armament was four 4 inch (102 mm) QF Mk XVI dual purpose (anti-ship and anti-aircraft) guns in two twin mounts, with a quadruple 2-pounder "pom-pom" and three Oerlikon 20 mm cannon providing close-in anti-aircraft fire. A single 2-pounder gun was later mounted on the ship's bow for dealing with enemy motor torpedo boats. Two 21-inch (533 mm) torpedo tubes were fitted in a single twin mount, while two depth charge chutes, four depth charge throwers and 70 depth charges comprised the ship's anti-submarine armament. Type 291 and Type 285 radar was fitted, as was Type 128 sonar. In Norwegian service, the ship's close-range anti-aircraft armament consisted of three 40 mm Bofors guns and two 20 mm cannon.

Glaisdale was one of 15 Type III Hunts ordered on 23 August 1940 as part of the 1940 War Emergency Programme in the last order placed for Hunt-class destroyers. She was laid down at Cammell Laird's Birkenhead shipyard on 4 February 1941, as yard number 1081, was launched on 5 January 1942 and completed on 12 June that year. Glaisdale was named after a Yorkshire fox hunt, and was the first ship with that name to be built for the Royal Navy. She was allocated the Pennant number L44.

== Service ==
Glaisdale was loaned to the Royal Norwegian Navy on 23 December 1941, while the ship was still under construction. Following commissioning and workup, the ship joined the 1st Destroyer Flotilla based at Portsmouth. On the night of 13/14 October 1942, Glaisdale took part in a large scale operation to intercept the German auxiliary cruiser Komet, which was attempting to break out into the Atlantic in order to raid Allied shipping. Glaisdale was one of five Hunts (Note: Glaisdale, Albrighton, Cottesmore, Eskdale and Quorn.) that were to patrol off Cap de la Hague together with eight Motor Torpedo Boats (MTBs), while four more waited off the Channel Islands. The MTBs became separated from the Glaisdale group of destroyers, which spotted the convoy (consisting of Komet, four torpedo boats (Note: T4, T10, T14 and T19) and two minesweepers) at about 01:00 on 14 October. The five destroyers took the convoy by surprise, setting Komet on fire and badly damaging T10, while the German defensive fire was ineffective, with fire from Komet hitting three of the German torpedo boats. MTB 236, which had lost contact with the other MTBs, spotted the battle, and torpedoed Komet at about 01:15 hr. Komet then blew up with the loss of all aboard. (Note: German post-battle analysis claimed the Komet was sunk after destroyer gunfire set fire to stores of aviation spirit held in the ship's holds, which in turn set off the raider's magazines.)

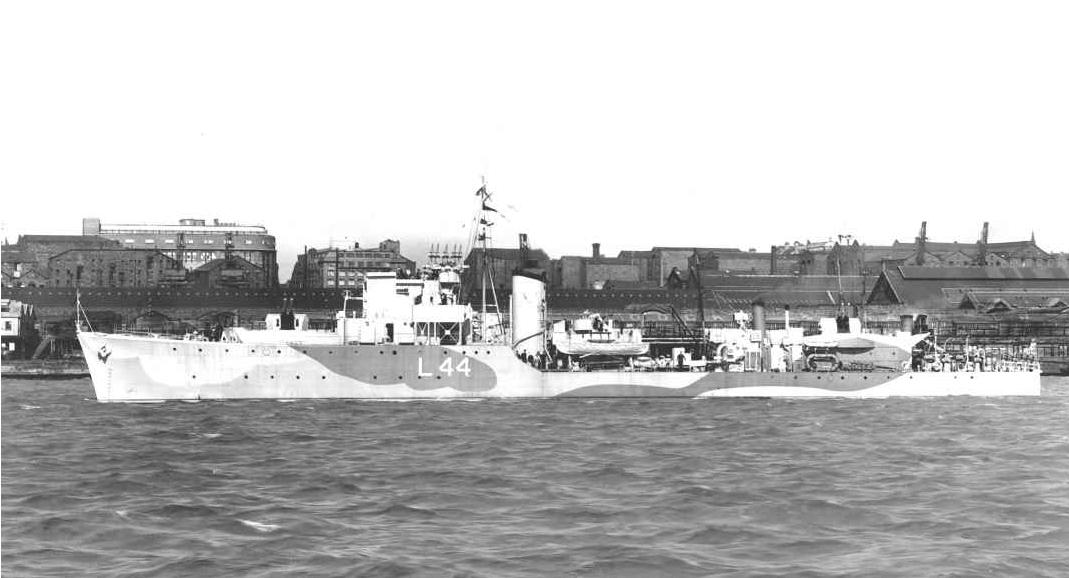
Glaisdale in 1942

In November 1942, Glaisdale was detached for convoy escort operations in support of Operation Torch, the Anglo-American invasion of French North Africa. On 15 November 1942, Glaisdale was escorting Convoy MKF1, returning to the United Kingdom from the Mediterranean, when the German submarine U-155 attacked the convoy, sinking the escort carrier Avenger and the British troop transport Ettrick, and damaging the American transport USS Almaack. Glaisdale rescued survivors from Avenger and Etterick, and took off 193 people from Almaack before the latter ship was towed back to Gibraltar. Glaisdale returned to home waters on 26 November 1942. On 1 December 1942, Glaisdale was part of the escort of Convoy PW256, when German E-boats were encountered off Start Point. The trawler Jasper was sunk, with another trawler and a Motor launch was damaged in the engagement.

On 6 January 1943, Glaisdale engaged three E-boats attempting to attack Convoy PW274, forcing them to break off the attack. On the evening of 10 February 1943, Glaisdale was one of five destroyers (Note: Glaisdale, Bleasdale, Cleveland, Eskdale and Goathland.) patrolling off Beachy Head which were ordered to intercept the intercept the German auxiliary cruiser Togo which had been spotted off Gravelines, but Togo was attacked and damaged by Allied aircraft, and put into Boulogne, causing the attack by Goathland's group of destroyers to be called off. On the night of 13/14 April 1943, Glaisdale was escorting Convoy PW323 along with the destroyer Eskdale and five armed trawlers, when the convoy was attacked by seven German E-boats. Both Eskdale and the frieghter Stanlake were sunk. No E-boats were lost. Early on 10 July 1943, Glaisdale and the destroyers Melbreak and Wensleydale attacked a group of five German minesweepers (Note: M9, M12, M10, M84 and M153.) escorted by two torpedo boats (Note: T24 and T25.) off the Île de Batz on the north coast of Brittany. The minesweeper M153 was sunk by shellfire and a torpedo, while another (M12) was damaged, while Melbreak was hit on the bridge by a shell from the torpedo boats, and Glaisdale and Wensleydale sustained splinter damage from near misses. Four men were wounded (one seriously) aboard Glaisdale while five were killed and 13 seriously wounded aboard Melbreak.

June 1944 saw Glaisdale take part in the Allied Invasion of Normandy. On D-Day, Glaisdale formed part of the escort for Convoy J.10, consisting of eight Landing Ship Infantry (LCIs), to Juno Beach, and then carried out gunfire support for the landings. On the night of 9/10 June, Glaisdale was on patrol off Le Havre with the destroyers Krakowiak and Ursa when they were attacked by the German torpedo boats Möwe, Jaguar and T28. The Allied force avoided the German attacks, with no damage caused to either side. On 23 June, Glaisdale set off an Acoustic mine while off Sword Beach. The mine exploded about 45 ft (14 m) off the ship's starboard side, and damaged her starboard engines, although the ship remained seaworthy. After being towed to port, the damage to the destroyer was surveyed, and the ship was paid off into reserve, reverting to Royal Navy control.

Glaisdale was sold to Norway in August 1946, and was renamed Narvik on 23 October that year. After being refitted at Chatham Dockyard, Narvik entered service at Tromso on 4 February 1947. Narvik was given the pennant number D309, but this was changed to D309 in 1956. The destroyer remained in active service until 1 May 1961, when she was stricken. The ship was sold to a Danish shipbreaker and scrapped from December 1961.
