= Handsome =

Handsome may refer to:

- Physical attractiveness
- Human physical appearance

== Music ==
- Handsome (band), an American rock band

=== Albums ===
- Handsome (EP), 1989 EP by American band Tar
- Handsome (Handsome album), 1997
- Handsome (Kilburn and the High-Roads album), 1975

=== Songs ===
- "Handsome" (song), a 2015 song by The Vaccines
- "Handsome", a 1991 song by Camouflage from Meanwhile
- "Handsome", a 2008 song by Sky Larkin
- "Handsome", a 2019 song by Chance the Rapper featuring Megan Thee Stallion from The Big Day
- "Handsome", a 2020 song by Dave East from Karma 3

=== Film ===
- Handsome: A Netflix Mystery Movie, 2017
- Rocky Handsome: a 2016 Hindi Movie

== People ==
- Ara the Handsome, a legendary Armenian hero
- Fernando I the Handsome (1345–1383), King of the Kingdom of Portugal
- Geoffrey the Handsome or Geoffrey Plantagenet (1113–1151), Count of Anjou, Duke of Normandy, and father of King Henry II of England
- Oleg I the Handsome (13th century), Prince of Ryazan (in present-day Russia)
- Philibert the Handsome or Philibert II (1480–1504), Duke of Savoy
- Philip the Handsome or Philip I (1478–1506), Duke of Burgundy and King of Castile
- Radu the Handsome or Radu cel Frumos (1439—1475), prince of the principality of Wallachia (Romania)

== Ships ==
- MV Handsome (1933), a British cargo ship in service 1970-71
- MV Handsome I (1933), a Panamanian cargo ship in service 1971-79
