= Dezhnev =

Dezhnev may refer to:

- Cape Dezhnev
- Semyon Dezhnyov
- 3662 Dezhnev
- Icebreaker Semyon Dezhnev
