= HMS Cottesmore (L78) =

Hunt-class destroyer of the British Royal Navy

- Cottesmore during the invasion of Normandy on 6 June 1944

History

United Kingdom
- Name: HMS Cottesmore
- Namesake: Cottesmore Hunt, Rutland
- Ordered: 21 March 1939
- Builder: Yarrow, Scotstoun
- Laid down: 12 December 1939
- Launched: 5 September 1940
- Commissioned: 29 December 1940
- Home port: Sheerness
- Identification: Pennant number: L78
- Honours and awards: North Sea 1941–45; English Channel 1942–44; Normandy 1944
- Fate: Sold to Egyptian Navy 20 April 1950
- Badge: On a Field Red, a lozenge Gold charged with a fret Red surmounted by an annulet Black

Egypt
- Name: Ibrahim el Awal
- Acquired: 20 April 1950
- Renamed: Mohammed Ali el Kebir, Port Said
- Refit: 17 July 1950 J. Samuel White, Cowes
- Home port: Port Said

General characteristics
- Class & type: Type I Hunt-class destroyer
- Displacement: 1,000 long tons (1,016 t) standard, 1,360 long tons (1,382 t) full load
- Length: 264 ft 3 in (80.54 m) pp, 280 ft (85.34 m) oa
- Beam: 29 ft (8.84 m)
- Draught: 7 ft 9 in (2.36 m)
- Propulsion: 2× Admiralty 3-drum boilers; 2 shaft Parsons geared turbines, 19,000 shp (14,000 kW)
- Speed: 27.5 kn (50.9 km/h; 31.6 mph)
- Range: 2,500 nmi (4,600 km; 2,900 mi) at 20 kn (37 km/h; 23 mph)
- Complement: 146
- Armament: 4 × QF 4-inch (102 mm) Mark XVI guns on twin mounts Mk. XIX; 4 × QF 2-pounder (40 mm) Mk VIII AA guns (1 × quad mount); 30 depth charges

HMS Cottesmore was a Hunt-class destroyer of the British Royal Navy. The ship was built by the Scottish shipbuilder Yarrow at their Scotstoun, Glasgow shipyard in 1939–1940, being launched on 5 September 1940 and commissioning on 29 December that year.

Cottesmore served in the North Sea and English Channel during the Second World War, and took part in the Invasion of Normandy in June 1944. She survived the war and was sold to Egypt in 1950, being renamed Ibrahim el Awal. The ship was again renamed Mohammed Ali el Kebir in 1951 and later renamed to Port Said. She was reduced to an accommodation hulk in 1986.

== Construction and design ==
HMS Cottesmore was ordered from the Scottish shipbuilder Yarrow on 11 April 1939, as part of the second batch of ten Hunt-class destroyers, following on from the first batch of ten Hunts ordered in March that year. The Hunts were meant to fill the Royal Navy's need for a large number of small destroyer-type vessels capable of both convoy escort and operations with the fleet, and were designed with a heavy anti-aircraft armament of six 4-inch anti-aircraft guns and a speed of 29 knots (33 mph; 54 km/h). An error during design, which was only discovered once the first ship of the class Atherstone was built, meant that the ships as designed were dangerously unstable. To restore stability, the first 23 Hunts, including Cottesmore, were modified by removing a twin 4-inch mount, cutting down the ships' superstructure and adding ballast. These ships were known as Type I Hunts. Later ships in the class had their beam increased, which allowed them to carry the originally intended armament, and were known as Type II Hunts.

Cottesmore was 264 feet 3 inches (80.54 m) long between perpendiculars and 280 feet (85.34 m) overall. The ship's beam was 29 feet 0 inches (8.84 m) and draught 7 feet 9 inches (2.36 m). Displacement was 1,000 long tons (1,000 t) standard and 1,360 long tons (1,380 t) under full load. Two Admiralty boilers raising steam at 300 pounds per square inch (2,100 kPa) and 620 °F (327 °C) fed Parsons single-reduction geared steam turbines that drove two propeller shafts, generating 19,000 shaft horsepower (14,000 kW) at 380 rpm. This gave a speed of 27.5 knots (50.9 km/h; 31.6 mph).

The ship's main gun armament was four 4 inch (102 mm) QF Mk XVI dual purpose (anti-ship and anti-aircraft) guns in two twin mounts, with one mount forward and one aft. Additional close-in anti-aircraft armament was provided by a quadruple 2-pounder "pom-pom" mount. The ship was later modified by adding two single Oerlikon 20 mm cannon on the bridge wings, while a single "pom-pom" was mounted in the ship's bow. Up to 40 depth charges could be carried. The ship had a complement of 146 officers and men.

Cottesmore was laid down at Yarrow's Scotstoun shipyard on 12 December 1939 and was launched on 5 September 1940. She was commissioned on 29 December 1940, with the Pennant number L78.

== Service ==
On commissioning, Cottesmore joined the 21st Destroyer Flotilla, based at Sheerness and employed on escorting convoys along the East coast of Britain, together with patrol duties and support for minelaying operations. On 17 March 1941, Cottesmore along with the destroyers Cattistock and Vesper were escorting convoy FN.33, when the convoy came under attack by German Schnellboote (motor torpedo boats) off Lowestoft. The convoy's escort repelled the attack.

On 12 March 1942, the German battleships Scharnhorst and Gneisenau and heavy cruiser Prinz Eugen left the port of Brest in Brittany to return to Germany via the English Channel in what became known as the Channel Dash. Cottesmore was one of several Sheerness-based destroyers ordered to intercept the German ships, but failed to make contact. On 28 July Cottesmore and sister ship Calpe engaged German patrol boats off Cap de la Hague. At least one patrol boat, V 202 Hermann Bösch was sunk. (Note: According to English, another patrol boat, V203 was also sunk.) On their return journey, the two destroyers were attacked by German aircraft, with Cottesmore being slightly damaged, with three of her crew wounded. On the night of 13/14 October 1942, Cottesmore formed part of a large force of Hunt-class destroyers (also including Albrighton, Eskdale, Glaisdale and Quorn) and eight Motor Torpedo Boats sent to stop the German auxiliary cruiser Komet, which was attempting to break out into the Atlantic in order to raid Allied shipping. Despite an escort of four Type 35 and Type 37 torpedo boats, Komet was sunk with all hands off Cherbourg by the British Motor Torpedo Boat MTB 236.

On 6 June 1944, Cottesmore took part in the Allied invasion of Normandy, escorting minesweepers to Gold Beach and then providing gunfire support to the landings. Following the initial landings, she remained on duty in the Channel until August, patrolling off the beaches to prevent attacks by German torpedo boats and midget submarines, and escorting reinforcement convoys. In November 1944, Cottesmore and sister ship Garth escorted the monitors Erebus and Roberts when they bombarded Walcheren during Operation Infatuate, the British landings on the island.

Cottesmore was reduced to reserve at Devonport on 28 February 1946, and in January 1949 was reduced further to Category C (or Extended) reserve. On 20 April 1950, the ship was sold to Egypt, and was renamed Ibrahim El Awal on 17 July 1950, and entered refit at the J. Samuel White shipyard at Cowes. She exchanged names with the Hunt-class destroyer Mohammed Ali el Kebir (the former HMS Mendip) in early 1951.

In the 1960s, her 2-pounder anti-aircraft guns were removed, and by 1971 had been renamed Port Said. Port Said's remaining close-in anti-aircraft armament was replaced by two Russian 37 mm and two 25 mm guns in the early 1970s, and in 1986 the ship, which was the last remaining Hunt-class destroyer in service, became an immobile accommodation hulk.

== Sources ==
- Blackman, Raymond V. B. (1962). Jane's Fighting Ships 1962–63. London: Sampson Low, Marston & Co., Ltd.
- Blackman, Raymond V. B., ed. (1971). Jane's Fighting Ships 1971–72. London: Jane's Yearbooks. ISBN 0-354-00096-9.
- Couhat, Jean Labayle; Baker, A. D. III, eds. (1986). Combat Fleets of the World 1986/87. Annapolis, Maryland, USA: Naval Institute Press. ISBN 0-85368-860-5.
- English, John (1987). The Hunts: A history of the design, development and careers of the 86 destroyers of this class built for the Royal and Allied Navies during World War II. World Ship Society. ISBN 0-905617-44-4.
- Friedman, Norman (2008). British Destroyers and Frigates: The Second World War and After. Barnsley, UK: Seaforth Publishing. ISBN 978-1-84832-015-4.
- Gardiner, Robert; Chesneau, Roger, eds. (1980). Conway's All The World's Fighting Ships 1922–1946. London: Conway Maritime Press. ISBN 0-85177-146-7.
- Gardiner, Robert; Chumbley, Stephen, eds. (1995). Conway's All The World's Fighting Ships 1947–1995. Annapolis, Maryland, USA: Naval Institute Press. ISBN 1-55750-132-7.
- Lenton, H.T. (1970). Navies of the Second World War: British Fleet & Escort Destroyers: Volume Two. London: Macdonald & Co. ISBN 0-356-03122-5.
- Rohwer, Jürgen; Hümmelchen, Gerhard (1992). Chronology of the War at Sea 1939–1945. London: Greenhill Books. ISBN 1-85367-117-7.
- Winser, John de S. (1994). The D-Day Ships: Neptune: the Greatest Amphibious Operation in History. Kendal, UK: World Ship Society. ISBN 0-905617-75-4.
- Whitley, M. J. (2000). Destroyers of World War Two: An International Encyclopedia. London: Cassell & Co. ISBN 1-85409-521-8.
