= HMS Brocklesby (L42) =

Destroyer of the Royal Navy

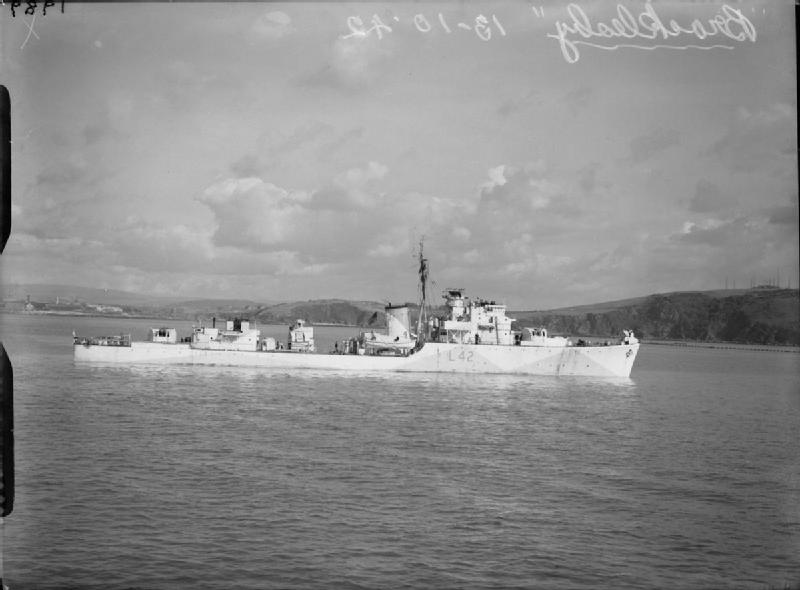
- Brocklesby underway 13 October 1942

History

United Kingdom
- Name: HMS Brocklesby
- Builder: Cammell Laird, Birkenhead
- Laid down: 18 November 1939
- Launched: 30 September 1940
- Completed: 9 April 1941
- Commissioned: 9 April 1941
- Identification: Pennant number: L42
- Honours and awards: ENGLISH CHANNEL 1942–43 – DIEPPE 1942 – SICILY 1943 – SALERNO 1943 – ATLANTIC 1943 – ADRIATIC 1944
- Fate: Scrapped at Faslane, 1968
- Badge: On a field red, a buckle gold

General characteristics
- Class & type: Type I Hunt-class destroyer
- Displacement: 1,000 long tons (1,000 t) standard; 1,360 long tons (1,380 t) full load
- Length: 264 ft 3 in (80.54 m) o/a
- Beam: 29 ft 0 in (8.84 m)
- Draught: 7 ft 9 in (2.36 m)
- Propulsion: 2 Admiralty 3-drum boilers; 2 shaft Parsons geared turbines, 19,000 shp (14,000 kW)
- Speed: 27.5 knots (31.6 mph; 50.9 km/h)
- Complement: 146
- Armament: 4 × QF 4-inch (102 mm) Mark XVI on twin mounts Mk. XIX; 4 × QF 2 pdr Mk. VIII on quad mount; 2 × 20 mm Oerlikons on single mounts; 40 × depth charges

HMS Brocklesby was a Type I Hunt-class destroyer of the Royal Navy. She served during the Second World War, spending much of the time in the English Channel and Mediterranean, taking part in the Dieppe Raid in 1942, and the Allied landings in Sicily and at Salerno in 1943. After the war, she was used as a sonar trials ship until 1963, and was sold for scrap in 1968.

== Construction and design ==
HMS Brocklesby was ordered from Cammell Laird on 4 September 1939, one of 17 Hunt-class destroyers ordered from various shipbuilders on that date, (including two from Lairds), which followed on from 20 ships ordered earlier in the year. The Hunts were meant to fill the Royal Navy's need for a large number of small destroyer-type vessels capable of both convoy escort and operations with the fleet, and were designed with a heavy anti-aircraft armament of six 4-inch anti-aircraft guns and a speed of 29 knots (33 mph; 54 km/h). An error during design, which was only discovered once the first ship of the class Atherstone was built, meant that the ships as designed were dangerously unstable. To restore stability, the first 23 Hunts, including Brocklesby, (Note: Some references list Brocklesby as a Type II Hunt. However, she appears to have been too advanced in construction to be converted and was completed with the 4-gun armament and the original beam.) were modified by removing a twin 4-inch mount, cutting down the ships' superstructure and adding ballast. These ships were known as Type I Hunts. Later ships in the class had their beam increased, which allowed them to carry the originally intended armament, and were known as Type II Hunts.

Brocklesby was 264 feet 3 inches (80.54 m) long between perpendiculars and 280 feet (85.34 m) overall. The ship's beam was 29 feet 0 inches (8.84 m) and draught 7 feet 9 inches (2.36 m). Displacement was 1,000 long tons (1,000 t) standard and 1,360 long tons (1,380 t) under full load. Two Admiralty boilers raising steam at 300 pounds per square inch (2,100 kPa) and 620 °F (327 °C) fed Parsons single-reduction geared steam turbines that drove two propeller shafts, generating 19,000 shaft horsepower (14,000 kW) at 380 rpm. This gave a speed of 27.5 knots (50.9 km/h; 31.6 mph).

The ship's main gun armament was four 4 inch (102 mm) QF Mk XVI dual purpose (anti-ship and anti-aircraft) guns in two twin mounts, with one mount forward and one aft. Additional close-in anti-aircraft armament was provided by a quadruple 2-pounder "pom-pom" mount. The ship was later modified by adding two single Oerlikon 20 mm cannon on the bridge wings. Up to 40 depth charges could be carried. The ship had a complement of 146 officers and men.

Brocklesby was laid down at Cammell Laird's Birkenhead shipyard on 18 November 1939 and was launched on 30 September 1940. She was completed on 9 April 1941.

== Service history ==
=== Second World War ===
After commissioning and workup, Brocklesby joined the 15th Destroyer Flotilla based at Portsmouth, escorting coastal convoys in the English Channel. On 20 March 1942 she was escorting a convoy off Trevose Head in Cornwall when the convoy came under attack by German aircraft, with Brocklesby claiming two German aircraft shot down. On 28 March she took part in the St Nazaire Raid. This was an amphibious assault on the port of St Nazaire in France with the objective of destroying the gates of the Normandie dock by ramming them with an explosive-packed destroyer, Campbeltown, and so prevent the dock's use by the German battleship Tirpitz. Brocklesby, along with sister ships Cleveland, Atherstone and Tynedale covered the return of the boats carrying the raiding force from St Nazaire, claiming a German Junkers Ju 88 bomber shot down. On 19 August 1942 she took part in the Dieppe Raid, providing fire support for the landings on Green Beach and was hit several times by shells from German shore batteries, which temporarily disabled Brocklesby's engines causing her to run aground. The damage received took six weeks to repair.

On the night of 13/14 October 1942, the German commerce raider Komet attempted to break out into the Atlantic through the Channel, escorted by torpedo boats and minesweepers. Brocklesby was part of one of two groups deployed to intercept Komet. After Komet was sunk by the motor torpedo boat MTB 326, part of the other group, Brocklesby engaged Komet's escort, before breaking off the engagement after coming under fire from German coastal artillery. Brocklesby continued to carry out both convoy escort and offensive operations against German shipping and was involved in an inconclusive engagement with an enemy convoy on 1 November 1942. On the night of 11/12 December, Brocklesby, together with the destroyers Albrighton, Eskdale, Vesper, Whitshed and Worcester, attacked a German convoy off Dieppe. Eskdale torpedoed and sank a German Sperrbrecher or auxiliary minesweeper, while all of the British ships were damaged, with Brocklesby receiving splinter damage from near misses which killed one of her crew.

During February 1943 she sailed for the Mediterranean, carrying out convoy escort duties near Gibraltar and in the Western Mediterranean. In July 1943 Brocklesby took part in Operation Husky, the Allied invasion of Sicily, escorting convoys and on 12 July carried Admiral Ramsay and Generals Eisenhower and Montgomery on an inspection of the beachheads. On 4 August 1943 Brocklesby escorted the monitor Roberts when Roberts shelled roads and railway lines near Taormina in an attempt to slow down the evacuation of German forces towards Messina, and on 15 August Brocklesby, together with the gunboats Aphis and Soemba, shelled targets south of Messina. On 9 September 1943 Brocklesby took part in Operation Avalanche, the Allied landings at Salerno in Italy.

In October 1943 she transferred to the Adriatic, where carried out shore bombardment and landing operations in support of partisans in addition to her normal convoy escort and patrol duties. On the night of 22/23 August 1944, Brocklesby engaged enemy motor torpedo boats attacking Ancona, while on the night of 13/14 November, she, together with Wheatland, shelled the port of Bar, Montenegro. (Note: Mason states that the attack on Bar took place in August 1943.) On 3 December 1944, she took part in the bombardment of a base for explosive motor boats on the island of Mali Lošinj. She remained in the Adriatic throughout the whole of 1944, returning to the UK for duties in the channel during early 1945.

=== Postwar and fate ===
In 1945 Brocklesby along with Southdown was sent to Wilhelmshaven to show the flag immediately after the end of the war. She was then converted to an aircraft target training ship, having her armament removed, serving in that duty at Rosyth and Portsmouth before being placed in reserve at Portsmouth in May 1946. She was reduced to Category C, or extended reserve after 1948, where she was not required for operational service but was preserved for future use.

Brocklesby went into refit at Devonport between 1951 and 1952, being converted into a trials vessel for anti-submarine operations. She was attached to the 2nd Training Squadron, although mainly carried out trials on behalf of the Underwater Detection Establishments at Portland or Gibraltar. In 1953 she took part in the Coronation Review of the Fleet to celebrate the Coronation of Queen Elizabeth II. Systems tested by Brocklesby included the Type 177 low-frequency hull sonar, which later equipped the Leander-class frigates, and the Type 192 Variable Depth Sonar. Brocklesby almost capsized during trials with the Type 192, when the sonar transducer hit a rock when being towed, and Type 192 was rejected in 1960 in favour of the lighter Canadian Type 199 sonar.

On 22 June 1963 she was paid off for the last time. Brocklesby was finally sold for scrap on 21 October 1968 and arrived at Faslane for breaking up on 23 October. She was the last of the Hunt class in Royal Navy service.

== Affiliations and awards ==
Brocklesby was named after the Brocklesby Hunt, and the ship's badge was based on the crest of Lord Yarborough, who was in charge of the Hunt. The ship was adopted by the town of Belper, Derbyshire in 1942, as part of the Warship Week National saving campaign.

The ship was awarded the following Battle honours:

- Dieppe 1942
- English Channel 1942–1943
- Atlantic 1943
- Sicily 1943
- Salerno 1943
- Adriatic 1944

== Bibliography ==
- Colledge, J. J.; Warlow, Ben (2006) [1969]. Ships of the Royal Navy: The Complete Record of All Fighting Ships of the Royal Navy from the 15th Century to the Present (3rd Rev ed.). London: Chatham Publishing. ISBN 978-1-86176-281-8. OCLC 67375475.
- Critchley, Mike (1982). British Warships Since 1945: Part 3: Destroyers. Liskeard, UK: Maritime Books. ISBN 0-9506323-9-2.
- English, John (1987). The Hunts: a history of the design, development and careers of the 86 destroyers of this class built for the Royal and Allied Navies during World War II. Kendal, UK: World Ship Society. ISBN 0-905617-44-4.
- Elliott, Peter (1977). Allied Escort Ships of World War II: A complete survey. London: Macdonald & Jane's. ISBN 0-356-08401-9.
- Friedman, Norman (2008). British Destroyers and Frigates: The Second World War and After. Barnsley, UK: Seaforth Publishing. ISBN 978-1-84832-015-4.
- Gardiner, Robert; Chesneau, Roger, eds. (1980). Conway's All The World's Fighting Ships 1922–1946. London: Conway Maritime Press. ISBN 0-85177-146-7.
- H.M. Ships Damaged or Sunk by Enemy Action: 3rd. SEPT. 1939 to 2nd. SEPT. 1945. Admiralty. 1952.
- Lenton, H.T. (1970). Navies of the Second World War: British Fleet & Escort Destroyers Volume Two. London: Macdonald & Co. ISBN 0-356-03122-5.
- Lenton, H. T.; Colledge, J. J. (1973). Warships of World War II (Second ed.). London: Ian Allan. ISBN 0-7110-0403-X.
- Osborne, Richard; Sowdon, David (1990). Leander Class Frigates. Kendal, UK: World Ship Society. ISBN 0-905617-56-8.
- Rohwer, Jürgen; Hümmelchen, Gerhard (1992). Chronology of the War at Sea 1939–1945. London: Greenhill Books. ISBN 1-85367-117-7.
- Roskill, S. W. (1960). The War at Sea 1939–1945: Volume III: The Offensive: Part I: 1st June 1943–31st May 1944. London: Her Majesty's Stationery Office.
- Whitley, M.J. (2000). Destroyers of World War Two: An International Encyclopedia. London: Cassell & Co. ISBN 1-85409-521-8.
