= German trawler V 213 Claus Bolten =

German fishing trawler, sunk 1944

History
- Name: Claus Bolten
- Owner: Cuxhavener Hochseefischerei (1926–29); Nordsee Deutsche Hochseefischerei Bremen-Cuxhaven AG (1929–41); Kriegsmarine (1941–44)
- Port of registry: (Weimar Republic) Cuxhaven, Germany (1926–33); (Nazi Germany) Cuxhaven, Germany (1933–41); Kriegsmarine (1941–44)
- Builder: Schiffsbau Unterweser mbH
- Yard number: 218
- Launched: 18 November 1926
- Completed: 12 December 1926
- Commissioned: 18 June 1941
- Out of service: 28 June 1944
- Identification: Code Letters RGCK (1926–34); Fishing boat registration HC 186 (1926–41); Code Letters DHED (1934–41); Pennant Number V 213 (1941–44)
- Fate: Sunk 28 June 1944

General characteristics
- Class & type: Fishing trawler (1926–41); Vorpostenboot (1941–44)
- Tonnage: 282 GRT, 109 NRT
- Length: 45.75 metres (150 ft 1 in)
- Beam: 7.40 metres (24 ft 3 in)
- Draught: 3.34 metres (10 ft 11 in)
- Depth: 4.22 metres (13 ft 10 in)
- Installed power: Compound steam engine, 57nhp
- Propulsion: Single screw propeller
- Speed: 11 knots (20 km/h)

Claus Bolten was a German fishing trawler which was requisitioned by the Kriegsmarine in the Second World War for use as a vorpostenboot, serving as V 213 Claus Bolten. She was sunk in a battle in the English Channel in July 1944.

== Description ==
The ship was 45.75 metres (150 ft 1 in) long, with a beam of 7.40 metres (24 ft 3 in). She had a depth of 4.22 metres (13 ft 10 in) and a draught of 3.34 metres (10 ft 11 in). She was powered by a four-cylinder compound steam engine, which had two cylinders of 32 centimetres (12 5/8 in) and two of 66 centimetres (26 in) diameter by 66 centimetres (26 in) stroke. The engine was made by Christiansen & Mayer, Harburg. It was rated at 57nhp. The engine powered a single screw propeller. It could propel the ship at 11 knots (20 km/h). She was assessed at 282 GRT, 109 NRT.

== History ==
Claus Bolten was built as yard number 219 by Schiffbau-Gesellschaft Unterweser m.b.H, Wesermünde, Germany. She was launched on 25 September 1937 and completed on 17 December. She was built for the Cuxhavener Hochseefischerei, Cuxhaven. The Code Letters RGCK were allocated, as was the fishing boat registration HC 186. On 8 March 1929, she was sold to the Deutsche Hochsee Fischerei Bremen-Cuxhaven AG. On 22 January 1932, she was one of seven trawlers that put in to Reyjkjavík, Iceland having been damaged by severe weather. Claus Bolten had her funnel carried away. In 1934, her Code Letters were changed to DHED.

On 18 June 1940, Claus Bolten was requisitioned by the Kriegsmarine for use as a vorpostenboot. She was allocated to 2 Vorpostenflottille as V 213 Claus Bolten. On 28 June 1944, she was sunk in the English Channel north west of Saint-Malo, Ille-et-Vilaine, France (48°41′N 2°05′W) in an engagement with HMS Eskimo and HMCS Huron. V 209 Carl Röver was severely damaged and the minesweeper M 4611 was sunk in the engagement.

== Sources ==
- Gröner, Erich (1993). Die deutschen Kriegsschiffe 1815-1945 (in German). Vol. 8/I: Flußfahrzeuge, Ujäger, Vorpostenboote, Hilfsminensucher, Küstenschutzverbände (Teil 1). Koblenz: Bernard & Graefe. ISBN 3-7637-4807-5.
- Karting, Herbert (2015). Itzehoer Schifffahrtschronik: Die maritime Geschichte der Stadt und ihres Hafens, ihrer Kaufleute, Schiffer, Reeder, Schiffbauer und deren Fahrzeuge bis zur Gegenwart (in German). Falkenburg. ISBN 978-3954940523.
