= German trawler V 202 Hermann Bösch =

German fishing trawler

History
- Name: Hermann Bösch
- Owner: C. C. H. Bösch (1937–39); Kriegsmarine (1939–42)
- Port of registry: (Nazi Germany) Bremerhaven, Germany (1937–39); Kriegsmarine (1939–42)
- Builder: Deschimag
- Yard number: 593
- Launched: October 1937
- Completed: 24 November 1937
- Commissioned: 30 September 1939
- Identification: Code Letters DOTK; Fishing boat registration BX261 (1937–39); Pennant number V 205 (1939); Pennant number V202 (1939–42)
- Fate: Shelled and sunk 28 July 1942

General characteristics
- Type: Fishing trawler (1937–39); Vorpostenboot (1939–42)
- Tonnage: 470 GRT, 170 NRT
- Length: 50.80 m (166 ft 8 in)
- Beam: 8.03 m (26 ft 4 in)
- Depth: 3.96 m (13 ft 0 in)
- Installed power: Triple expansion steam engine, 96nhp
- Propulsion: Single screw propeller
- Crew: 35 (Kriegsmarine service)

Hermann Bösch was a German fishing trawler that was requisitioned by the Kriegsmarine in the Second World War for use as a Vorpostenboot, serving as V 205 Hermann Bösch and V 202 Hermann Bösch. She was shelled and sunk in the English Channel off La Hague, Manche, France by HMS Calpe and HMS Cottesmore on 28 July 1942.

== Description ==
Hermann Bösch was 50.80 metres (166 ft 8 in) long, with a beam of 8.03 metres (26 ft 4 in) and a depth of 3.96 metres (13 ft 0 in). She was assessed at 470 GRT, 170 NRT. She was powered by a triple expansion steam engine which had cylinders of 35 centimetres (13 3/4 in), 55 centimetres (21 5/8 in) and 64.6 centimetres (25 7/16 in) diameter by 64.9 centimetres (25 9/16 in) stroke. The engine was built by Deschimag Seebeck, Wesermünde and was rated at 96nominal horsepower. It drove a single screw propeller via a low-pressure turbine, double reduction gearing and a hydraulic coupling.

== History ==
Hermann Bösch was built as yard number 592 by Deschimag, Wesermünde. She was launched in October 1937 and completed on 24 November. She was built for C. C. H. Bösch. She was completed by Deschimag Seebeck, Wesermünde. Her port of registry was Bremerhaven. The Code Letters DOTK and fishing boat registration BX 261 were allocated.

On 30 September 1939, Hermann Bösch was requisitioned by the Kriegsmarine and commissioned as the Vorpostenboot V 205 Hermann Bösch. She was redesignated V 202 Hermann Bösch on 20 October. On 9 September 1941, she assisted V 208 R. Walther Darré in rescued the crew of the cargo ship Trifels, which had been torpedoed and sunk off Boulogne, Pas-de-Calais, France by the Motor Torpedo Boat MTB 54. On 28 July 1942, she was shelled and sunk in the English Channel off La Hague, Manche, France by HMS Calpe, HMS Cottesmore, and two motor gun boats. Her captain survived, but 34 crew were killed. Vorpostenboot V 203 Carl Röver was damaged beyond repair in the same engagement.
