= HMS Vesper =

Destroyer of the Royal Navy

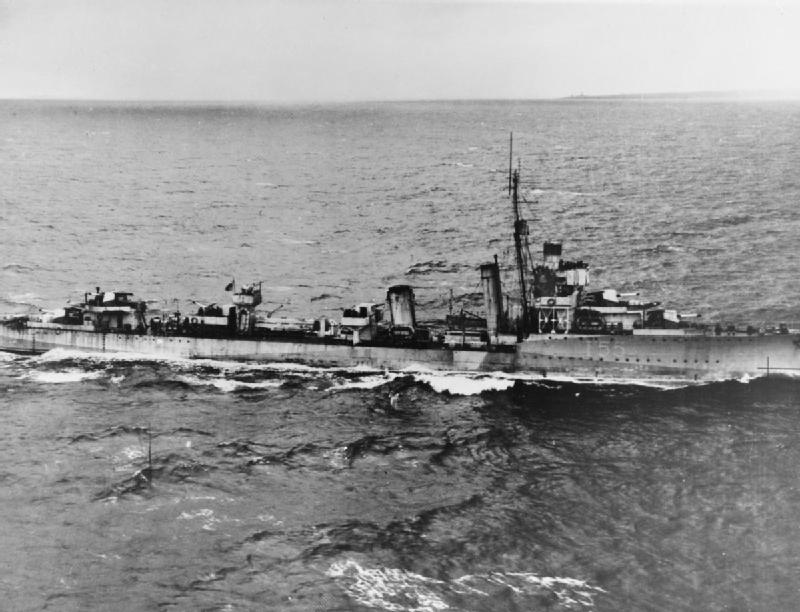
- HMS Vesper during World War II.

History

United Kingdom
- Name: HMS Vesper
- Ordered: 30 June 1916
- Builder: Alexander Stephen and Sons, Glasgow
- Laid down: 7 December 1916
- Launched: 15 December 1917
- Completed: 20 February 1918
- Commissioned: 20 February 1918
- Decommissioned: 1920s (?)
- Recommissioned: 1939
- Decommissioned: mid-1945
- Motto: Nescis quod vesper vehat ("You know not what the evening brings forth")
- Honours and awards: Battle honours for: Atlantic 1939-1945; North Sea 1941; English Channel 1941-1945; Normandy 1944
- Fate: Sold for scrapping 7 March 1947; Scrapping began March 1948
- Badge: A silver star on a blue field

General characteristics
- Class & type: Admiralty V-class destroyer
- Displacement: 1,272-1,339 tons
- Length: 300 ft (91.4 m) o/a, 312 ft (95.1 m) p/p
- Beam: 26 ft 9 in (8.2 m)
- Draught: 9 ft (2.7 m) standard, 11 ft 3 in (3.4 m) deep
- Propulsion: 3 Yarrow type Water-tube boilers; Brown-Curtis steam turbines; 2 shafts, 27,000 shp
- Speed: 34 kt
- Range: 320-370 tons oil, 3,500 nmi at 15 kt, 900 nmi at 32 kt
- Complement: 110
- Armament: 4 × QF 4 in Mk.V (102mm L/45), mount P Mk.I; 2 × QF 2 pdr Mk.II "pom-pom" (40 mm L/39) or; 1 × QF 3-inch 20 cwt (76-mm) Mk.I, mount HA Mk.II; 4 (2x2) tubes for 21-inch (533 mm) torpedoes
- Notes: Pennant number: D55

HMS Vesper was a V-class destroyer of the British Royal Navy that saw service in World War I and World War II.

== Construction and commissioning ==
Vesper, the first Royal Navy ship of the name, was ordered on 30 June 1916 as part of the 9th Order of the 1916–17 Naval Programme. She was laid down on 7 December 1916 by Stephen's of Govan, Glasgow, and launched on 15 December 1917. She was completed on 20 February 1918.

== Service history ==
=== World War I ===
Vesper joined the fleet for service during World War I, and remained in service after the 11 November 1918 Armistice with Germany that ended the war, but later was decommissioned and placed in reserve.

=== World War II ===
==== 1939-1942 ====
Vesper was recommissioned in 1939. After the United Kingdom entered World War II in September 1939, she was assigned to convoy defence and patrol duties in the Southwestern Approaches through December 1939. From January through April 1940, she performed similar duties in the English Channel and North Sea. On 14 February 1940 she and the destroyer HMS Whitshed rescued 72 survivors of the British merchant ship Sultan Star, which the German submarine U-77 had sunk southwest of the Scilly Isles at position 48°54′00″N 010°03′00″W.

In May 1940, Vesper was deployed with the 19th Destroyer Flotilla to Harwich, England, and assigned to the support of the evacuation of troops from France. On 10 May 1940 she carried a demolition party to Ymuiden in the Netherlands in Operation XD to destroy oil tanks there to prevent their capture by advancing German Army forces, and on 14 May 1940 she took part in Operation Ordnance, the evacuation of forces from the Hook of Holland. During June 1940, deployed with her destroyer flotilla to Dover and provided gunfire support to the retreating British Expeditionary Force at Le Tréport, France.

Vesper was reassigned to the 21st Destroyer Flotilla at Sheerness in July 1940 for anti-invasion patrol and convoy escort duties in the English Channel and North Sea, which she continued until December 1940. She and the destroyer HMS Windsor rescued 111 survivors of the British merchant ship Beignon, which the German submarine U-30 had sunk 300 nautical miles west of Ushant at position 47°20′00″N 010°30′00″W. On 13 September 1940 she joined the destroyer leader HMS Campbell and escort destroyer HMS Garth in an anti-invasion patrol off the coast of the Netherlands and to bombard Ostend, Belgium, but poor visibility prompted cancellation of the bombardment. On 8 October 1940 she towed the escort destroyer HMS Hambledon to safety at Sheerness after Hambledon detonated a naval mine in the English Channel off South Foreland at position 51°08′00″N 001°21′00″E and suffered severe damage.

In December 1940, Vesper was assigned to duty in the Western Approaches and steamed to the River Clyde. From there, she departed on 19 December 1940 with the destroyers HMS Harvester and HMS Highlander to provide local escort to Convoy WS 5A. The three ships detached from the convoy on 21 December 1940 and returned to the Clyde. For the next two years, Vesper continued her duties in the Western Approaches. On 19 June 1941, she towed the destroyer HMS Vanessa to safety after Vanessa suffered heavy damage from a bomb hit amidships while under attack by German aircraft and collided with the naval trawler HMS Turquoise. Vesper herself collided with the destroyer HMS Vivacious on 31 August 1942. On 12 December 1942, Vesper, Whitshed, and the destroyer HMS Worcester, the escort destroyers HMS Albrighton and HMS Brocklesby, and the Royal Norwegian Navy escort destroyer HNoMS Eskdale attacked German shipping in the English Channel, with torpedoes from Eskdale sinking the 387-gross-register-ton Sperrbrecher Beijerland (Sperrbrecher 144) west of Le Tréport, France, at position 50°05′00″N 001°09′00″E and torpedoes from Whitshed sinking the 1,236-gross-register-ton Gauss (‘’Sperrbecher’’ 178) northeast of Dieppe, Seine-Maritime, France at 50°04′00″N 001°09′00″E.

==== 1943-1945 ====
In December 1942, the Royal Navy selected Vesper for conversion to a "long-range escort," which was completed in mid-1943. After passing her post-conversion acceptance trials, she steamed to Tobermory, Isle of Mull, in August 1943 for work-ups. In September 1943 she joined the 2nd Escort Group for convoy escort duty in the North Atlantic Ocean, which she carried out until January 1944, when she was transferred to the 6th Escort Group for convoy escort work in the Western Approaches. In February 1944 she joined the destroyers HMS Fame and HMS Vanquisher, the frigate HMS Deveron, the corvettes HMS Kingcup and HMS Vervain, and the Royal Norwegian Navy corvettes HNoMS Acanthus, HNoMS Eglantine, and HNoMS Rose as the escort of Convoy ONS 29, which two German Junkers Ju 88 aircraft attacked on 14 February 1944.

In April 1944, Vesper was chosen to take part in Operation Neptune, the assault phase of the upcoming invasion of Normandy, scheduled for early June 1944, as a part of Escort Group 112 in Western Task Force O. She joined Force O in May 1944 and participated in pre-invasion exercises that month. In early June 1944 she joined the other ships of Force O at Portland, England, and on 5 and 6 June deployed to defend convoys bound for the 6 June assault at Omaha Beach. She joined the naval trawlers HMS Grassholm and HMS Neave on 7 June 1944 to form Escort Group 142, which escorted Convoy EBC 1 – consisting of 23 pre-loaded coasters and an armament stores ship – to the Normandy beachhead that day. From 8 June 1944 she operated from the assembly area at Milford Haven, Wales, in the defense of convoys transporting reinforcements and supplies to the beachhead until Operation Neptune came to an end in the latter part of June 1944.

Vesper served on convoy escort duty in the English Channel from July through September 1944, then operated on convoy defense duties in waters around the British Isles until the surrender of Germany in early May 1945.

During the Second World War Vesper was adopted by the town of Skipton as part of Warship Week. The plaque from this adoption is held by the National Museum of the Royal Navy in Portsmouth.

== Decommissioning and disposal ==
After Germany's surrender, Vesper did not deploy operationally, and she soon was decommissioned and placed in reserve, being no longer included on the Royal Navy's July 1945 active list. She was sold to BISCO on 7 March 1947 for scrapping by Thos. W. Ward, and arrived at the shipbreaker's yard in March 1948.

== Bibliography ==
- Campbell, John (1985). Naval Weapons of World War II. Annapolis, Maryland: Naval Institute Press. ISBN 0-87021-459-4.
- Chesneau, Roger, ed. (1980). Conway's All the World's Fighting Ships 1922–1946. Greenwich, UK: Conway Maritime Press. ISBN 0-85177-146-7.
- Colledge, J. J.; Warlow, Ben (2006) [1969]. Ships of the Royal Navy: The Complete Record of All Fighting Ships of the Royal Navy from the 15th Century to the Present (3rd Rev ed.). London: Chatham Publishing. ISBN 978-1-86176-281-8. OCLC 67375475.
- Cocker, Maurice. Destroyers of the Royal Navy, 1893–1981. Ian Allan. ISBN 0-7110-1075-7.
- Friedman, Norman (2009). British Destroyers From Earliest Days to the Second World War. Annapolis, Maryland: Naval Institute Press. ISBN 978-1-59114-081-8.
- Gardiner, Robert & Gray, Randal, eds. (1985). Conway's All the World's Fighting Ships 1906–1921. Annapolis, Maryland: Naval Institute Press. ISBN 0-85177-245-5.
- Lenton, H. T. (1998). British & Empire Warships of the Second World War. Annapolis, Maryland: Naval Institute Press. ISBN 1-55750-048-7.
- March, Edgar J. (1966). British Destroyers: A History of Development, 1892–1953; Drawn by Admiralty Permission From Official Records & Returns, Ships' Covers & Building Plans. London: Seeley Service. OCLC 164893555.
- Preston, Antony (1971). 'V & W' Class Destroyers 1917–1945. London: Macdonald. OCLC 464542895.
- Raven, Alan & Roberts, John (1979). 'V' and 'W' Class Destroyers. Man o'War. Vol. 2. London: Arms & Armour. ISBN 0-85368-233-X.
- Rohwer, Jürgen (2005). Chronology of the War at Sea 1939–1945: The Naval History of World War Two (Third Revised ed.). Annapolis, Maryland: Naval Institute Press. ISBN 1-59114-119-2.
- Whinney, Bob (2000). The U-boat Peril: A Fight for Survival. Cassell. ISBN 0-304-35132-6.
- Whitley, M. J. (1988). Destroyers of World War 2. Annapolis, Maryland: Naval Institute Press. ISBN 0-87021-326-1.
- Winser, John de D. (1999). B.E.F. Ships Before, At and After Dunkirk. Gravesend, Kent: World Ship Society. ISBN 0-905617-91-6.
