= German trawler V 209 Carl Röver =

German trawler and patrol boat

History
- Name: Carl Röver (1933–45); Essen (1945–56); Hans Peter (1956–70); Handsome (1970–71); Handsome I (1971–79); Walid (1979–80); Samir (1980–85)
- Namesake: Carl Röver
- Owner: Nordsee Deutsche Hochseefischerei Bremen-Cuxhaven AG (1933–39); Kriegsmarine (1939–45); Nordsee Deutsche Hochseefischerei Bremen AG (1945–55); Günter Trulsen (1955–56); Peter Witthein (1956–70); M. K. Walsh (1970–71); A. King & Sons Navigation Ltd (1971–72); Chameleon Shipping Co., S.A. (1972–79); A. R. Hegazi Bureau d'Assistance Maritime Agence, (1979–80); Z. H. Abiyad (1980–85)
- Port of registry: (Nazi Germany) Wesermünde, Germany (1933–39); Kriegsmarine (1939–45); Bremen, Allied-occupied Germany (1945–49); (1949–56) Bremen, West Germany; Itzehoe, West Germany (1956–70); Great Yarmouth, United Kingdom (1970–71); Panama City, Panama (1971–79); Beirut, Lebanon (1979–85)
- Builder: Seebeckwerft
- Yard number: 505
- Launched: July 1933
- Completed: 24 August 1933
- Commissioned: 28 September 1939
- Decommissioned: September 1944
- Out of service: 1985
- Identification: Code Letters DNPM (1934–39); Fishing boat registration ON 148 (1933–34); Fishing boat registration PG 483 (1934–39); Pennant Number V 209 (1939); Pennant Number V 203 (1939–45); Fishing boat registration BX 343 (1945–56)
- Fate: Lost or scrapped

General characteristics
- Type: Fishing trawler (1933–39, 1945–56); Vorpostenboot (1939–45); Cargo ship (1956–85)
- Tonnage: 396 GRT, 151 NRT (1939–56); 440 GRT, 246 NRT (1956–85)
- Length: 45.45 m (149 ft 1 in)
- Beam: 7.69 m (25 ft 3 in)
- Draught: 4.65 m (15 ft 3 in)
- Depth: 3.81 m (12 ft 6 in)
- Installed power: Triple expansion steam engine, 112nhp (1933–56); Diesel engine (1956–85)
- Propulsion: Single screw propeller
- Speed: 10 knots (19 km/h)

Carl Röver was a German fishing trawler which was requisitioned by the Kriegsmarine in the Second World War for use as a vorpostenboot, serving as V 209 Carl Röver and V 203 Carl Röver. Severely damaged in the war, she was repaired post-war and re-engined. She served as the fishing trawler Essen and was later converted to a cargo ship. She served as Hans Peter, Handsome, Handsome I, Walid and Samir under the flags of West Germany, the United Kingdom, Panama and the Lebanon. She was lost in 1985.

== Description ==
The ship was 45.45 metres (149 ft 1 in) long, with a beam of 7.69 metres (25 ft 3 in). She had a depth of 3.81 metres (12 ft 6 in) and a draught of 4.65 metres (15 ft 3 in). She was powered by a triple expansion steam engine, which had cylinders of 35 centimetres (13 3/4 in), 55 centimetres (21 5/8 in) and 88 centimetres (34 5/8 in) diameter by 72.5 centimetres (28 9/16 in) stroke. The engine was made by Deschimag Seebeckwerft, Wesermünde. It was rated at 112nhp. The engine powered a single screw propeller driven via a geared low pressure turbine. It could propel the ship at 10 knots (19 km/h). She was assessed at 396 GRT, 151 NRT.

== History ==
The ship was built as yard number 505 by Deschimag Seekbeckwerft, Wesermünde. She was launched in July 1933 and completed on 24 August. She was built for the Nordsee Deutsche Hochseefischerei Bremen-Cuxhaven AG. The ship was named for Carl Röver, a Nazi Gauleiter and party official. Carl Röver was one of the first two fishing trawlers built by Bremenhaven-based shipbuilder Seebeckwerft after Hitler's rise to power, along with R. Walther Darré. The Code Letters DNPM were allocated, as was the fishing boat registration ON 148. This was changed to PG 489 on 17 October 1934.

Carl Röver took part in the Festungkriegsübung Swinemünde naval exercises on 10 June 1937. She was requisitioned by the Kriegsmarine on 28 September 1939 for use as a Vorpostenboot. She was allocated to 2 Vorpostenflottille as V 209 Carl Röver. On 20 October, she was redesignated V 203 Carl Rover. On 28 July 1942, Carl Röver and V 292 Hermann Bösch involved in a battle with the Royal Navy destroyers HMS Calpe, HMS Cottesmore, and two motor gun boats in the English Channel off La Hague, Manche, France. V 202 Hermann Bösch was sunk. Carl Röver was severely damaged. She was taken in to Cherbourg, Manche, France with her forecastle burnt out. Following repairs, she returned to service on 6 July 1943. On 13 July 1944, she was severely damaged in an engagement with HMS Eskimo and HMCS Huron in which V 213 Claus Bolten and the minesweeper M 4611 were sunk. HMS Eskimo was severely damaged by gunfire from Carl Röver. Due to damage received, Carl Röver was withdrawn from service in September 1944.

Carl Röver was repaired in November 1945. She returned to merchant service in December as the fishing boat Essen, registration BX343, under the ownership of the Nordsee Deutsche Hochseefischerei AG, Bremen. In December 1955, Essen was sold to Gunter Trulsen, Bremerhaven. He sold her to Peter Witthein, Heiligenstedten in March 1956. Witthein had her converted to a cargo ship and renamed Hans Peter. The work was done by Hugo Peters, Wewelsfleth. Her steam engine and boilers were removed, with the latter sold to the Poseidon Line for use in their steamships. Lloyd's Register continued to list her as a fishing trawler. She was now assessed at 440 GRT, 246 NRT. Her port of registry was Itzehoe, West Germany. She was now fitted with a four-stroke single action diesel engine which had six cylinders of 290 millimetres (11 7/16 in) diameter by 420 millimetres (16 9/16 in) stroke. The engine was built by Maschinenbau Kiel, Kiel, West Germany. Hans Peter was chartered to the Poseidon Line and was mainly used for trade with Norway.

Hans Peter suffered an engine failure in 1970 and was condemned. She was sold to M. K. Walsh, Great Yarmouth, Norfolk, United Kingdom, who had her repaired and renamed Handsome. She was sold the next year to A. King & Sons Navigation Ltd., Panama and was renamed Handsome I. She was sold to Chameleon Shipping Co. S.A., Panama in 1972. In 1979, Handsome I was sold to A. R. Hegazi Bureau d'Assistance Maritime Agence, Beirut, Lebanon and was renamed Walid. She was sold to Z. H. Abiyad, Beirut the next year and was renamed Samir. She was lost or scrapped in 1985.

== Sources ==
- Gröner, Erich (1993). Die deutschen Kriegsschiffe 1815-1945 (in German). Vol. 8/I: Flußfahrzeuge, Ujäger, Vorpostenboote, Hilfsminensucher, Küstenschutzverbände (Teil 1). Koblenz: Bernard & Graefe. ISBN 3-7637-4807-5.
- Karting, Herbert (2015). Itzehoer Schifffahrtschronik: Die maritime Geschichte der Stadt und ihres Hafens, ihrer Kaufleute, Schiffer, Reeder, Schiffbauer und deren Fahrzeuge bis zur Gegenwart (in German). Falkenburg. ISBN 978-3954940523.
- Paterson, Lawrence (2018). Hitler's Forgotten Flotillas: Kriegsmarine Security Forces. Pen & Sword Books. ISBN 9781473882416.
