= HMS Eskimo (F75) =

Tribal-class destroyer launched 1937

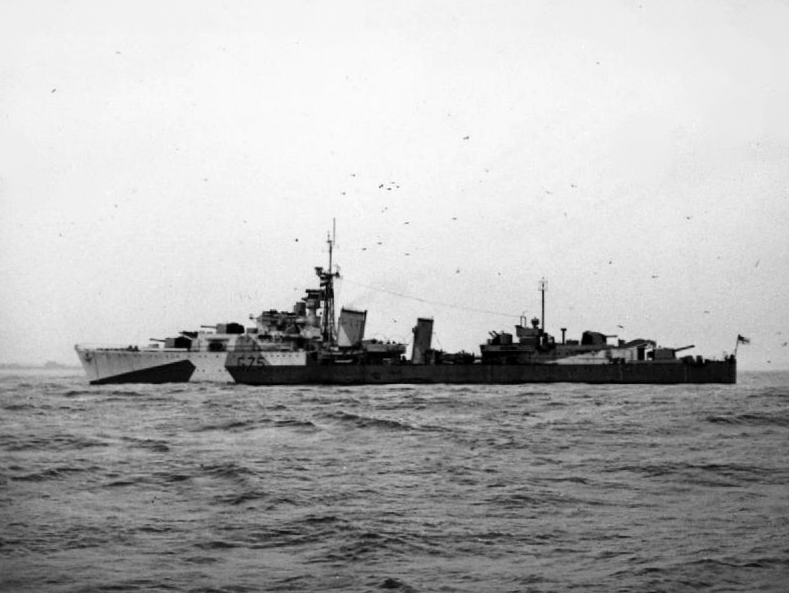
- Eskimo in April 1944

History

United Kingdom
- Name: Eskimo
- Namesake: Eskimo
- Ordered: 19 June 1936
- Builder: Vickers-Armstrongs, Walker, Newcastle upon Tyne
- Cost: £342,108
- Laid down: 5 August 1936
- Launched: 3 September 1937
- Completed: 30 December 1938
- Identification: Pennant numbers: L75, F75 & G75
- Fate: Sold for scrap, 27 June 1949

General characteristics (as built)
- Class & type: Tribal-class destroyer
- Displacement: 1,891 long tons (1,921 t) (standard); 2,519 long tons (2,559 t) (deep load)
- Length: 377 ft (114.9 m) (o/a)
- Beam: 36 ft 6 in (11.13 m)
- Draught: 11 ft 3 in (3.43 m)
- Installed power: 3 × Admiralty 3-drum boilers; 44,000 shp (33,000 kW)
- Propulsion: 2 × shafts; 2 × geared steam turbines
- Speed: 36 knots (67 km/h; 41 mph)
- Range: 5,700 nmi (10,600 km; 6,600 mi) at 15 knots (28 km/h; 17 mph)
- Complement: 190
- Sensors & processing systems: ASDIC
- Armament: 4 × twin 4.7 in (120 mm) guns; 1 × quadruple 2-pdr (40 mm (1.6 in)) AA guns; 2 × quadruple 0.5 in (12.7 mm) anti-aircraft machineguns; 1 × quadruple 21 in (533 mm) torpedo tubes; 20 × depth charges, 1 × rack, 2 × throwers

HMS Eskimo was a Tribal-class destroyer, Eskimo served throughout the Second World War, seeing action in Norway, the Mediterranean, the English Channel and in Burma. After the war Eskimo was used as an accommodation and headquarters ship, finally being used as a practice target before being scrapped in 1949.

== Description ==
The Tribals were intended to counter the large destroyers being built abroad and to improve the firepower of the existing destroyer flotillas and were thus significantly larger and more heavily armed than the preceding I class. The ships displaced 1,891 long tons (1,921 t) at standard load and 2,519 long tons (2,559 t) at deep load. They had an overall length of 377 feet (114.9 m), a beam of 36 feet 6 inches (11.13 m) and a draught of 11 feet 3 inches (3.43 m). The destroyers were powered by two Parsons geared steam turbines, each driving one propeller shaft using steam provided by three Admiralty three-drum boilers. The turbines developed a total of 44,000 shaft horsepower (33,000 kW) and gave a maximum speed of 36 knots (67 km/h; 41 mph). During her sea trials Eskimo made 36.3 knots (67.2 km/h; 41.8 mph) from 45,450 shp (33,890 kW) at a displacement of 1,987 long tons (2,019 t). The ships carried enough fuel oil to give them a range of 5,700 nautical miles (10,600 km; 6,600 mi) at 15 knots (28 km/h; 17 mph). The ships' complement consisted of 190 officers and ratings, although the flotilla leaders carried an extra 20 officers and men consisting of the Captain (D) and his staff.

The primary armament of the Tribal-class destroyers was eight quick-firing (QF) 4.7-inch (120 mm) Mark XII guns in four superfiring twin-gun mounts, one pair each fore and aft of the superstructure, designated 'A', 'B', 'X', and 'Y' from front to rear. The mounts had a maximum elevation of 40°. For anti-aircraft (AA) defence, they carried a single quadruple mount for the 40-millimetre (1.6 in) QF two-pounder Mk II "pom-pom" gun and two quadruple mounts for the 0.5-inch (12.7 mm) Mark III machine gun. Low-angle fire for the main guns was controlled by the director-control tower (DCT) on the bridge roof that fed data acquired by it and the 12-foot (3.7 m) rangefinder on the Mk II Rangefinder/Director directly aft of the DCT to an analogue mechanical computer, the Mk I Admiralty Fire Control Clock. Anti-aircraft fire for the main guns was controlled by the Rangefinder/Director which sent data to the mechanical Fuze Keeping Clock.

The ships were fitted with a single above-water quadruple mount for 21-inch (533 mm) torpedoes. The Tribals were not intended as anti-submarine ships, but they were provided with ASDIC, one depth charge rack and two throwers for self-defence, although the throwers were not mounted in all ships; Twenty depth charges was the peacetime allotment, but this increased to 30 during wartime.

=== Wartime modifications ===
Heavy losses to German air attack during the Norwegian Campaign demonstrated the ineffectiveness of the Tribals' anti-aircraft suite and the RN decided in May 1940 to replace 'X' mount with a pair of QF 4-inch (102 mm) Mark XVI dual-purpose guns in a twin-gun mount. To better control the guns, the existing rangefinder/director was modified to accept a Type 285 gunnery radar as they became available. The number of depth charges was increased to 46 early in the war, and still more were added later. To increase the firing arcs of the AA guns, the rear funnel was shortened and the mainmast was reduced to a short pole mast.

== Construction and career ==
Authorized as one of nine Tribal-class destroyers under the 1936 Naval Estimates, Eskimo was the second ship of her name to serve in the Royal Navy. The ship was ordered on 19 June 1936 from Vickers-Armstrongs and was laid down on 5 August at the company's High Walker, Newcastle upon Tyne, shipyard. Launched on 3 September 1937, Eskimo was commissioned on 30 December 1938 at a cost of £342,108 which excluded weapons and communications outfits furnished by the Admiralty.

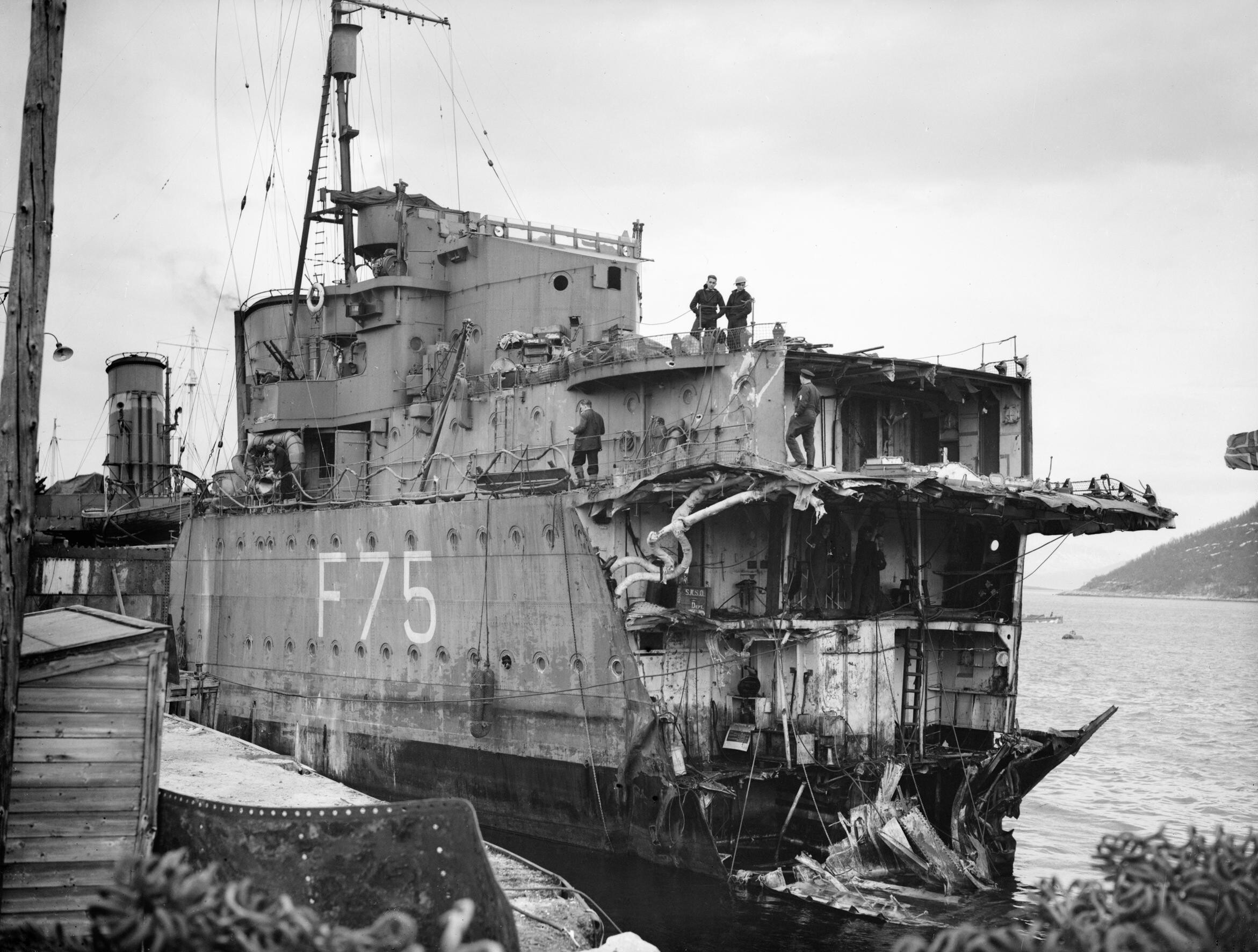
Eskimo after losing her bow during the Second Battle of Narvik

Eskimo participated in the Second Battle of Narvik in April 1940. On 12 April, Eskimo was hit by a torpedo fired from German destroyer Z2 Georg Thiele. The explosion caused severe damage, blowing off Eskimo's bow. After temporary repairs by the shipwrights of the fleet repair ship Vindictive at Skjelfjorden in Norway, Eskimo was able to return to the Vickers-Armstrong works at Newcastle for rebuilding, which took until Sept. 1940.

She took part in Operation Pedestal in August 1942 and then supported the Allied landings in North Africa in November 1942 and served with the 10th Destroyer Flotilla at Plymouth. Eskimo was extensively damaged when two German dive bombers attacked her in the Mediterranean while taking part in Operation Husky. She cornered and sank the enemy German submarine U-971 while in company with the Canadian destroyer Haida and a Liberator aircraft of the No. 311 Squadron RAF in the English Channel north of Brest on 24 June 1944. On 13 July 1944, Eskimo and HMCS Huron engaged the vorpostenboote V 203 Carl Röver, V 213 Claus Bolten and the minesweeper M 4611 in the English Channel. Although V 213 Claus Bolten and M 4611 were sunk and V 203 Carl Röver was severely damaged, Eskimo was herself severely damaged by gunfire from V 203 Carl Röver. During the final days of the war, she operated in the Far East.

== Fate ==
Eskimo was reduced to an accommodation and headquarters ship for minesweepers, wreck-disposal vessels, and salvage craft clearing the Thames and Medway estuaries in 1946. She was used as a target ship in the Gareloch, sold for scrap on 27 June 1949 and finally broken up at Troon.

=== Museum holdings ===
Eskimo's bell is in the collection of the National Maritime Museum. Imperial War Museums holds a range of material relating to Eskimo, including photographs, film, and an officially commissioned watercolour by Vivian Pitchforth showing Eskimo refitting at Durban. The National Museum of the Royal Navy holds a detailed ship model of Eskimo, built by Commander John West. West had served in Eskimo as navigating officer at Narvik.

Her Pennant and Crest are on display at St Clares Church in Newton Aycliffe, Co Durham
