= HMS Albrighton =

Hunt-class destroyer operated by the United Kingdom and West Germany

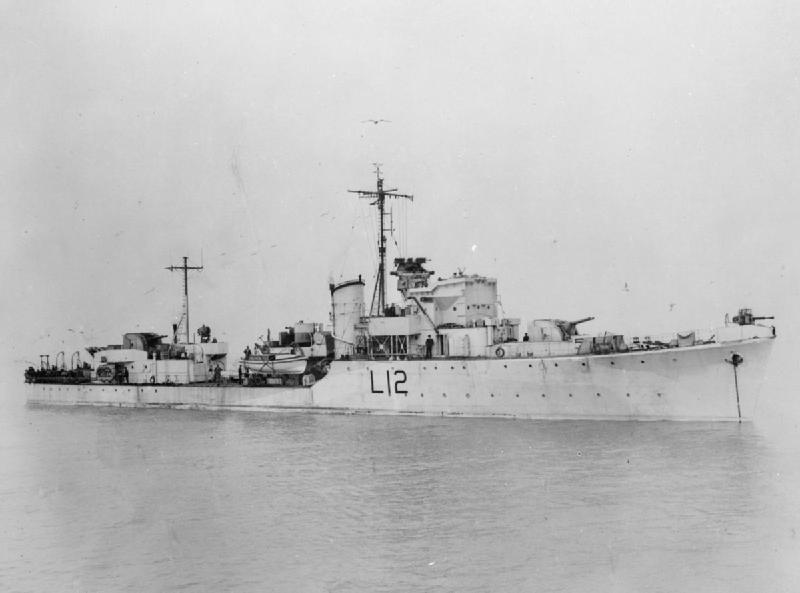
- Albrighton in 1943

History

United Kingdom
- Name: Albrighton
- Namesake: Albrighton Hunt
- Ordered: 4 July 1940
- Builder: John Brown & Company, Clydebank
- Laid down: 30 December 1940
- Launched: 11 October 1941
- Commissioned: 22 February 1942
- Identification: Pennant number: L12
- Fate: Sold to West Germany, 11 November 1957

West Germany
- Name: Raule
- Acquired: 11 November 1957
- Commissioned: 14 May 1959
- Decommissioned: 1968
- Identification: Pennant number: F217
- Fate: Sold for scrap, 1969

General characteristics
- Class & type: Type III Hunt-class destroyer
- Displacement: 1,050 long tons (1,067 t) standard, 1,490 long tons (1,514 t) full load
- Length: 264 ft 3 in (80.54 m) pp, 280 ft (85.34 m) oa
- Beam: 31 ft 6 in (9.60 m)
- Draught: 7 ft 9 in (2.36 m)
- Propulsion: 2 Admiralty 3-drum boilers; 2 shaft Parsons geared turbines, 19,000 shp (14,000 kW)
- Speed: 27 knots (50 km/h; 31 mph)
- Range: 3,700 nmi (6,900 km; 4,300 mi) at 14 knots (26 km/h; 16 mph)
- Complement: 168
- Armament: 4 × QF 4 in Mark XVI guns on twin mounts Mk. XIX; 5 × QF 2 pdr Mk. VIII (1 × quad mount and 1 × single bow chaser mount); 3 × 20 mm Oerlikons; 2 × 21 in (533 mm) torpedo tubes; 70 depth charges, 4 throwers, 2 racks

HMS Albrighton was a Type III Hunt-class destroyer built for the British Royal Navy. She entered service in February 1942, first carrying out an attack on German ships in the English Channel then taking part in the Dieppe Raid, rescuing survivors from the sinking destroyer HMS Berkeley. Albrighton was next assigned to search for and destroy the German auxiliary cruiser Komet, then escorted a convoy to Gibraltar in prevision of the Allied landings in North Africa. Between December 1942 and April 1943, she participated in the sinking of three more Axis ships with the First Destroyer Flotilla. During the Normandy Landings in June 1944, Albrighton served as a headquarters ship, then sank two German trawlers in the weeks after the invasion. After being converted to a destroyer in early 1945, she was damaged in a collision with a Landing Ship, then was assigned to the British Eastern Fleet. However, the war ended before she was deployed and Albrighton went into reserve.

In 1957, she was refitted in Liverpool, then sold to the West German Navy and commissioned under then name Raule. She served as a training ship until 1968, when she was decommissioned and sold for scrap metal in Hamburg the next year.

== Construction ==
HMS Albrighton was ordered for the Royal Navy from the shipbuilder John Brown & Company on 4 July 1940, one of seven Type III Hunt-class destroyers ordered as part of the 1940 War Emergency Programme on that date. The Hunt class was meant to fill the Royal Navy's need for a large number of small destroyer-type vessels capable of both convoy escort and operations with the fleet. The Type III Hunts differed from the previous Type II ships in replacing a twin 4-inch gun mount by two torpedo tubes to improve their ability to operate as destroyers.

Albrighton was laid down at John Brown's Clydebank shipyard on 30 December 1940. Construction was slowed by damage received during German air raids, with the ship being launched on 11 October 1941 and commissioning on 22 February 1942.

Albrighton was 264 feet 3 inches (80.54 m) long between perpendiculars and 280 feet (85.34 m) overall. The ship's beam was 31 feet 6 inches (9.60 m) and draught 7 feet 9 inches (2.36 m). Displacement was 1,050 long tons (1,067 t) standard and 1,490 long tons (1,514 t) under full load. Two Admiralty boilers raising steam at 300 pounds per square inch (2,100 kPa) and 620 °F (327 °C) fed Parsons single-reduction geared steam turbines that drove two propeller shafts, generating 19,000 shaft horsepower (14,000 kW) at 380 rpm. This gave a speed of 27 knots (50 km/h; 31 mph). 345 long tons (351 t) of oil fuel were carried, giving a range of 3,700 nautical miles (6,900 km; 4,300 mi) at 15 knots (28 km/h; 17 mph).

Main gun armament was four 4 inch (102 mm) QF Mk XVI dual purpose (anti-ship and anti-aircraft) guns in two twin mounts, with a quadruple 2-pounder "pom-pom" and three Oerlikon 20 mm cannon providing close-in anti-aircraft fire. Like many of the Hunts, a single 2-pounder "pom-pom" was later mounted on the ship's bow for close-in combat with small fast vessels such as German E-boats. Two 21 inch (530 mm) torpedo tubes were fitted in a single twin mount, while two depth charge chutes, four depth charge throwers and 70 depth charges comprised the ship's anti-submarine armament. Type 291 and Type 285 radar was fitted, as was Type 128 sonar.

== Service ==
=== Royal Navy ===
Following commissioning, Albrighton worked up at Greenock before joining the First Destroyer Flotilla based at Portsmouth in April 1942, being deployed on convoy escort and anti-E-boat operations, engaging German E-boats on 24 April and 6 May. On 19 June 1942, Albrighton and the Steam Gun Boats SGB 6, SGB 7 and SGB 8 attacked a German convoy off the Cotentin Peninsula, with SGB 7 and one German transport being sunk. Albrighton sailed as part of Operation Jubilee, the Dieppe Raid on 19 August 1942, escorting landing craft. She received minor damage from German shore batteries, and when the destroyer HMS Berkeley (L17) was struck by two bombs, breaking Berkeley's back and causing heavy flooding, Albrighton helped to rescue survivors from Berkeley before scuttling the stricken ship with torpedoes.

On the night of 13/14 October 1942, Albrighton formed part of a large force of Hunt-class destroyers (also including Cottesmore, Eskdale, Glaisdale and Quorn) and eight Motor Torpedo Boats sent to stop the German auxiliary cruiser Komet, which was attempting to break out into the Atlantic in order to raid Allied shipping. Despite an escort of four Type 35 and Type 37 torpedo boats, Komet was sunk with all hands off Cherbourg by the British Motor Torpedo Boat MTB 236. From 2–10 November 1942, she formed part of the escort for Convoy KMS 2, taking troops to Gibraltar in preparation for Operation Torch, the Anglo-American invasion of French North Africa. On 12 November 1942, after the destroyer HMS Marne was damaged by a torpedo when rescuing survivors from the torpedoed depot ship HMS Hecla, Albrighton assisted Marne until the tug Salvonia towed Marne to Gibraltar. Albrighton then returned to the United Kingdom as part of the escort for Convoy MKF 001.

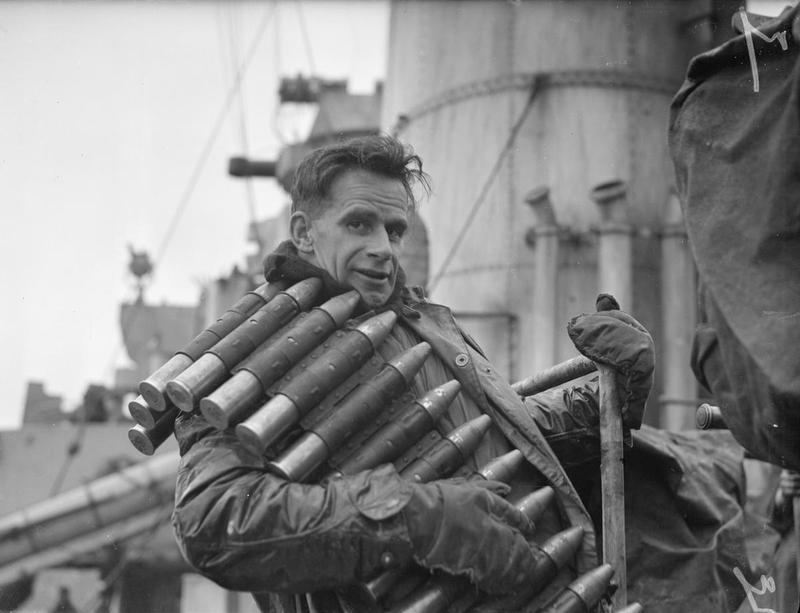
A gunner of HMS Albrington at Devonport, following the sinking of two enemy supply ships off Brittany. 29 April 1943. He carries ammunition for one of the ship's 2-pounder pom-pom guns. (IWM A16193)

Albrighton then returned to normal duties with the First Destroyer Flotilla, and on 12 December 1942, took part in Operation Valuable, an attack on a German convoy off Dieppe, when the German Sperrbrecher (auxiliary minesweeper) Beijerland was sunk by Albrighton and Eskdale. On the night of 27–28 April 1943, Albrighton and the Hunt-class Goathland sank the Italian blockade runner Butterfly and the German anti-submarine trawler UJ1402. Albrighton was damaged in this action, with eight killed and 25 wounded.

In February 1944 Albrighton was selected for conversion to a headquarters ship for control and landing craft in preparation for the upcoming invasion of France. When the Normandy landings started on 6 June 1944, Albrighton served as an escort vessel for landing craft and as a reserve headquarters ship for several weeks before returning to patrol operations. On 12 August, Albrighton attacked three trawlers south of Lorient, and sank two trawlers two weeks later.

In early 1945, Albrighton was reconverted to a destroyer, joining the 21st Destroyer Flotilla at Sheerness for service in the North Sea and Thames Estuary. She was damaged in collision with the Landing Ship LST 238 on 23 May 1945, and following repairs, was allocated to the Eastern Fleet, and was refitted for service in Eastern waters at Immingham until December that year. As the war had now ended, Albrighton went into reserve at Devonport, moving to Gibraltar in 1953, and returning to the UK in 1955, where she was hulked on 6 January 1956.

=== German Navy ===
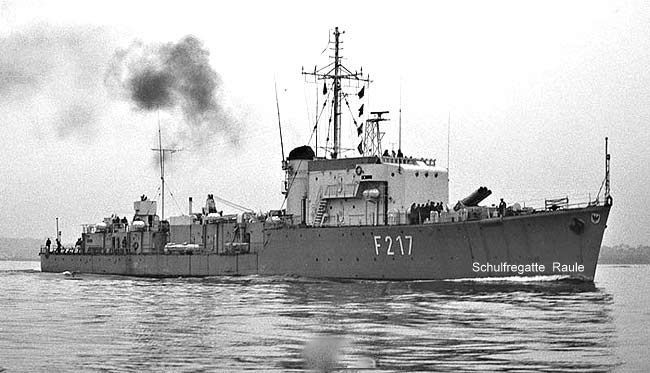
Raule in service with the German Navy

In May 1956, Albrighton was one of seven frigates selected for transfer to the new West German Navy, being sold on 11 November 1957, and refitted in Liverpool before commissioning in the German Navy on 14 May 1959 as Raule. Raule was re-equipped to better fit the ship to the role of anti-submarine training, with her armament being modified, with the forward 4-inch mounting being removed and the quadruple "pom-pom" replaced by a 40 mm Bofors gun, and more modern anti-submarine equipment fitted. Raule was decommissioned in 1968 and was sold for scrap to Eisen and Metall of Hamburg in 1969.

== Publications ==
- Blackman, Raymond V.B. (1962). Jane's Fighting Ships 1962–63. Sampson Low, Marston & Co. Ltd.
- Colledge, J. J.; Warlow, Ben (2006) [1969]. Ships of the Royal Navy: The Complete Record of All Fighting Ships of the Royal Navy from the 15th Century to the Present (3rd Rev ed.). London: Chatham Publishing. ISBN 978-1-86176-281-8. OCLC 67375475.
- English, John (2001). Afridi to Nizam: British Fleet Destroyers 1937–43. Gravesend, UK: World Ship Society. OCLC 49841510.
- English, John (1987). The Hunts: A History of the Design, Development and Careers of the 86 Destroyers of This Class Built for the Royal and Allied Navies During World War II. Cumbria, UK: World Ship Society. ISBN 0-905617-44-4.
- Gardiner, Robert; Chesneau, Roger, eds. (1980). Conway's All The World's Fighting Ships 1922–1946. London: Conway Maritime Press. ISBN 0-85177-146-7.
- Gardiner, Robert; Chumbley, Stephen, eds. (1995). Conway's All The World's Fighting Ships 1947–1995. Annapolis, Maryland, USA: Naval Institute Press. ISBN 1-55750-132-7.
- Lenton, H.T. (1970). Navies of the Second World War: British Fleet & Escort Destroyers Volume Two. London: Macdonald & Co. ISBN 0-356-03122-5.
- Rohwer, Jürgen; Hümmelchen, Gerhard (1992). Chronology of the War at Sea 1939–1945. London: Greenhill Books. ISBN 1-85367-117-7.
- Whitley, M.J. (2000). Destroyers of World War Two: An International Encyclopedia. London: Cassell & Co. ISBN 1-85409-521-8.
