= Howaldt family =

The Howaldt family is a German family, whose members were famous commanders, shipyards and sculptors.

== Notable members ==
- August Howaldt, founder of the German shipyard Howaldtswerke
- Georg Ferdinand Howaldt, German sculptor, brother of August Howaldt
- Hans Howaldt, submarine commander and grandson of August Howaldt
