= German auxiliary cruiser Komet =

German commerce raider

Coordinates: 49°44′0″N 1°32′0″W

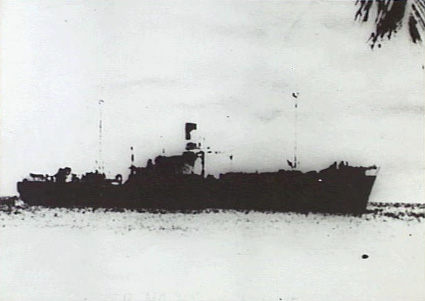
- Komet c. 1941

History

Germany
- Name: Komet
- Namesake: Comet
- Operator: Norddeutscher Lloyd
- Builder: Deschimag A.G. Weser
- Launched: 16 January 1937
- Christened: Ems
- Home port: Bremen
- Fate: Requisitioned by Kriegsmarine, 1939

Nazi Germany
- Name: Komet
- Namesake: Comet
- Operator: Kriegsmarine
- Builder: Howaldtswerke, Hamburg (conversion)
- Yard number: 7
- Acquired: 1939
- Commissioned: 2 June 1940
- Renamed: Komet (1940)
- Reclassified: Auxiliary cruiser (1940)
- Nickname(s): HSK-7; Schiff-45; Raider B
- Fate: Sunk on 14 October 1942 after hit by a torpedo near Cap de la Hague.

General characteristics
- Tonnage: 3,287 GRT
- Displacement: 7,500 tons
- Length: 115.5 m (379 ft)
- Beam: 15.3 m (50 ft)
- Draught: 6.5 m (21 ft)
- Propulsion: 2 Diesel engines
- Speed: 16 knots (30 km/h; 18 mph)
- Range: 35,100 nautical miles (65,000 km)
- Complement: 274
- Armament: 6 × 15 cm (5.9 in) SK L/45; 1 × 75 mm (3 in); 1 × 3.7 cm (1.5 in) SK C/30; 4 × 2 cm (0.79 in) C/30 AA guns; 6 × 53.3 cm torpedo tubes; 30 × EMC mines; 1 x torpedo boat LS 2
- Aircraft carried: 2 Arado Ar 196 A-1

Komet (German for comet) (HSK-7) was an auxiliary cruiser of Nazi Germany's Kriegsmarine in the Second World War, intended for service as a commerce raider. Known to the Kriegsmarine as Schiff 45, to the Royal Navy she was named Raider B.

After completing one successful raid in the South Pacific, she was sunk by a British motor torpedo boat in October 1942 whilst attempting to break out into the Atlantic on another.

== Construction and conversion ==
Launched on 16 January 1937 as the merchant ship Ems at Deschimag A.G. Weser shipyard in Bremen for Norddeutscher Lloyd (NDL), she was requisitioned at the start of the Second World War in 1939, converted into an auxiliary cruiser at Howaldtswerke in Hamburg, and commissioned into the Kriegsmarine on 2 June 1940. The ship was 115.5 m long and 15.3 m wide, had a draught of 6.5 m, and registered 3,287 gross register tons (GRT). She was powered by two diesel engines that gave her a speed of up to 16 knots (30 km/h).

As a commerce raider, Komet was armed with six 15 cm guns, one 7.5 cm gun, one 3.7 cm and four 2 cm AA guns, as well as six torpedo tubes. She also carried a small 15-ton fast boat ("Meteorit", of the "LS2" class) intended to lay mines and an Arado 196 A1 seaplane.

Drawing of the Komet. Note the Arado 196 seaplane

== First raid voyage ==
=== Breakout into the Pacific ===
After a long period of negotiations between Nazi Germany and the Soviet Union, the Soviets agreed to provide Germany with access to the Northern Sea Route through which Germany could access the Pacific Ocean. Although the two countries had signed the Molotov–Ribbentrop Pact (with secret protocols dividing Eastern Europe) and an undisclosed commercial agreement (extensive military and civilian aid pact), the Soviet Union still wished to maintain the veneer of being neutral, and secrecy thus was required. Initially, the two countries had agreed to send 26 ships, including four armed merchant cruisers, but because of a variety of difficulties, this was soon reduced to just one vessel, the Komet, the smallest one of the units that Germany wanted to use as auxiliary raiders.

Prior to being sent on the Northern Sea Route, the Komet was equipped with a specially strengthened bow and a propeller suitable for navigating through ice. Under the command of Kapitän zur See (later Konteradmiral) Robert Eyssen, HSK7 departed for her first raiding voyage from Gotenhafen (now Gdynia in Poland), on 3 July 1940 with a crew of 270. The ship stopped in Bergen on 9 July to refuel and resupply. Then she started again her route towards the Arctic Ocean.

With the consent of the then supposedly neutral Soviet Union, Komet initially made her way along the Norwegian coast disguised as the Soviet icebreaker Semyon Dezhnev. While waiting in Teriberka Bay in July and August because of Soviet security concerns, she took the fake name the Donau. With assistance from the Soviet icebreaker Lenin, she passed through the several Arctic Ocean passages in August. She also later received help from the Joseph Stalin. In early September, the Komet crossed the Bering Strait into the Pacific Ocean.

Komet disguised as the Manyo Maru

The passage was an achievement and would have ended in disaster had it not been for the Soviets, whose help had come at a price: 950,000 Reichsmarks.

Movements of the three German ships in December 1940 and January 1941

Once in the Pacific, Eyssen sailed down to the Japanese island of Lamutrik and met the Orion and Kulmerland in mid-October. After a conference on strategy, the three captains decided to work together, concentrating on the New Zealand to Panama passage taken by most of the Allied merchant ships. They decided on Japanese disguises – Komet and Kulmerland had the names Manyo Maru and Tokio Maru painted on their hulls.

=== Raiding in South Pacific waters ===
In early November, Komet resupplied and refueled in Japan, disguised as the Japanese merchantman Manio Maru. She operated with the Orion, disguised as Mayebashi Maru and the supply ship Kulmerland, posing as the Tokio Maru.

Together with the other two ships, on 25 November she sank the coaster Holmwood and two days later, when 300 miles east of New Zealand, the passenger liner Rangitane, raiding her precious food load. By that time, Komet had already been at sea for 140 days and Eyssen admitted in his war diary that he had become depressed and frustrated at not having encountered the enemy.

During December, Komet and Orion casually met in the waters surrounding Nauru Island and proceeded to sink five Allied merchant ships, with a combined tonnage of about 41,000 tons, that had been waiting off the island to load phosphate. Three of these ships -- Triona, Vinni and Komata—were sunk between 6 and 7 December by Komet, which took more than 500 prisoners; the prisoners were landed a few days later on Emirau Island.

=== Attack on Nauru ===
At the end of December Eyssen planned to lay a minefield at the entrance of the Rabaul's harbour. He was forced to abandon his plan due to an engine failure on the Meteorit boat that was designed for the mission. He, therefore, decided to set course towards Nauru, wanting to land his troops and occupy the phosphate processing and loading facilities on the island. The bad weather though convinced Eyssen to change his plans into a direct attack to the island infrastructure.

On 27 December 1940 the Komet sent a warning to the island and announced that the attack was about to begin. She shelled and heavily damaged the loading plants and mooring buoys of the port. The bombardment lasted an hour, and it caused the loss of 13,000 tons of oil. The Nauru phosphate extraction facilities did not resume their pre-war output levels until the end of the conflict. The action also led to the promotion of Eyssen to Konteradmiral on 1 January 1941.

After the Nauru attack (probably the major German success in the Pacific operational area during the war) the Komet received the order to set a new course towards south, crossing the Indian Ocean and scouting the presence of Allied whalers. After a few months with no success, the ship reached the shores of Antarctica on 16 February 1941; later on 6 March she had a stop on the French Kerguelen Islands and had there a brief meeting with the German auxiliary ship Pinguin.

=== Operations in the Atlantic Ocean and Galapagos Islands ===
The hunt for allied ships in the Indian Ocean met with no success; after some months, Eyssen sailed towards the Panama Canal, hoping to find more convoys in the Pan-American Security Zone, recently opened to military actions from the Kriegsmarine high command. From 14 July 1941 until 25 July the Komet was resupplied by the German freighter Anneliese Essberger near the Tuamotu Archipelago. At this time, the Komet was disguised as the Osaka Shosen Kaisha line Ryoku Maru.

On 14 August the ship met the British freighter Australind near the Galápagos Islands and sank it. Three days later the German cruiser met the Dutch 7,300 ton freighter Kota Nopan, loading more than 2,000 tons of tin and manganese. Due to her precious load, the supply ship was spared from sinking and captured. On 19 August Komet met the freighter Devon and sank it. Except for some casualties, the German sailors saved the crew members of the enemy ships, who became prisoners of war.

=== Pacific Ocean and return voyage ===
After these three successes, Eyssen decided to move out of the area, fearful of the reaction of the Allied navy. Komet headed towards New Zealand accompanied by the captured Kota Nopan. At the end of September she had a brief meeting with the auxiliary cruiser Atlantis and transferred to her a part of the prisoners and cargo load.

Komet then received the order to return to Germany. The ship set a new course towards Cape Horn, sailing at a slower speed in the Atlantic Ocean disguised as the Portuguese freighter S. Thomé. The captured Kopa Notan was sent as a prize to Bordeaux, in occupied France, arriving there on 17 November. Komet reached the French port of Cherbourg on 26 November, disguised as the freighter Sperrbrecher 52. The day after she had a short stop in Le Havre and then sailed towards Germany. Some British torpedo bombers spotted her in the English Channel but were not able to sink her. After having landed all her prisoners of war at Cuxhaven, the auxiliary cruiser finally reached Hamburg on 30 November 1941 after a voyage of 516 days and about 100,000 nautical miles (190,000 km). The ship had sunk seven ships (two in conjunction with the raider Orion) for a total of 41,568 tons.

== Second raid ==
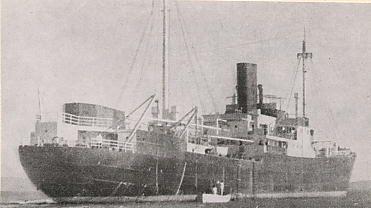
HSK Komet in 1942

The Komet was prepared for a second raiding voyage in October 1942, after 11 months of complete repair. Only two of her original officers had remained on board and Kapitän zur See Ulrich Brocksien took over command.

On 7 October 1942 the raider, disguised as a minesweeper, departed from the occupied Dutch port of Vlissingen with the objective of reaching the Atlantic. After a short stay in Dunkirk, on 12 October the Komet set course towards Le Havre.

Initial attempts by the Royal Navy to attack the ship in the Straits of Dover had failed. On 13 October, Komet sailed from Le Havre with an escort of four or five Type 35 torpedo boats. (Note: Type 37 torpedo boats may have been included in the escorts, as well as the type 35s.) Unsure of the exact route that the German ship would follow, and aware of the fast speed of the German vessels, four groups of warships were assembled to make an interception to the West of the Cherbourg Peninsula. Group A, consisted of HMS Cottesmore, Quorn, Albrighton, Glaisdale and Eskdale. Two flotillas of MTBs made up Groups C and D. These three groups headed for a position near Cap de la Hague. Group B (the destroyers Brocklesby, Fernie, Tynedale and the Polish Krakowiak) were further West, near the Channel Islands.

The German convoy were spotted by a Coastal Command aircraft in the middle of the Baie de la Seine, travelling at 16 knots, and groups A, C and D hurried to get into position. In the particularly dark night and moderately rough sea conditions, the MTB flotillas became separated from the destroyers.

At just before 1:00 am, Cottesmore sighted the German vessels. The Allied ships fired star shells to illuminate the target and then opened fire. To the British attackers, the Germans appeared taken completely by surprise and in the confusion, opened fire on each other, until eventually firing torpedoes at the Allied ships (all of which missed). Two of the escorts were on fire and the other German ships turned inshore to gain the protection of the coastal artillery batteries.

The most junior commanding officer in group D was Sub-Lieutenant Robert Drayson, who had just taken over in MTB 236 after the previous C.O. had gone sick. As junior, Drayson was last in the line of MTBs and became separated from the rest of the flotilla as they crossed the Channel. Drayson continued independently to Cap de La Hague. None of the other Allied MTBs arrived in the area. After a while, Drayson saw star shells and tracer as the battle started and increased speed. He decided to approach the action from the shoreward side to catch any German vessel trying to get away. This put MTB 236 in position to see Komet illuminated by a star shell. The German ship was travelling at more than 15 knots, exchanging fire with the Allied destroyers who were in pursuit. Drayson's MTB was ahead of the German ship and crept in at slow speed to fire two torpedoes at a range of 500 yards. MTB 236 immediately turned away and "crash-started" her main engines to escape under cover of a smoke-screen. Komet had now sighted her and switched fire. Within a few seconds, both torpedoes struck Komet, followed by a huge secondary explosion. The force of this blast lifted the stern of MTB 236 out of the water and put out of action two of the boat's three engines, leaving her to return home at reduced speed.

Group B had moved to join the battle and engaged some of the remaining German vessels, but with the main target gone and shore battery fire now becoming more accurate, broke off the action and returned home.

Komet sank with no survivors. Sub-Lt Drayson was awarded the Distinguished Service Cross for his part in the action. The Allied forces experienced only two minor casualties, despite being under heavy fire.

== Komet discovered ==
The wreck of HK Komet was discovered by nautical archaeologist Innes McCartney off Cap de la Hague in July 2006 and was surveyed by a team led by him in 2007. She is in two halves and upside down, with a large part of the center section blown away by the explosion that sank her. She lies in 55.0 metres (180.4 ft) of water.

== Raiding career ==
Victims: (Source)

- 25 November 1940 Holmwood 546 GRT
- 6 December 1940 Triona 4,413 GRT
- 7 December 1940 Vinni 5,181 GRT
- 7 December 1940 Komata 3,900 GRT
- 14 August 1941 Australind 5,020 GRT
- 17 August 1941 Kota Nopan 7,322 GRT (captured)
- 19 August 1941 Devon 9,036 GRT

Sunk together with Orion

- 27 November 1940 RMS Rangitane 16,712 GRT
- 8 December 1940 Triadic 6,378 GRT
- 8 December 1940 Triaster 6,032 GRT
