= Semyon Dezhnev (icebreaker) =

Semyon Dezhnev may refer to one of the following icebreakers named after Semyon Dezhnev:

- Early in World War II Germany made arrangements with the Soviet Union for the German auxiliary cruiser Komet to travel the Northern Sea Route across the top of Siberia, so it could raid allied merchant shipping in the Pacific Ocean. As a ruse de guerre the Komet disguised herself as the Soviet icebreaker Semyon Dezhnev so it could avoid allied detection as it proceeded up the Norwegian coast.
- Semyon Dezhnev (1971), a Soviet and later Russian diesel-electric icebreaker built in 1971.
