= HMS Quorn (L66) =

Destroyer of the Royal Navy

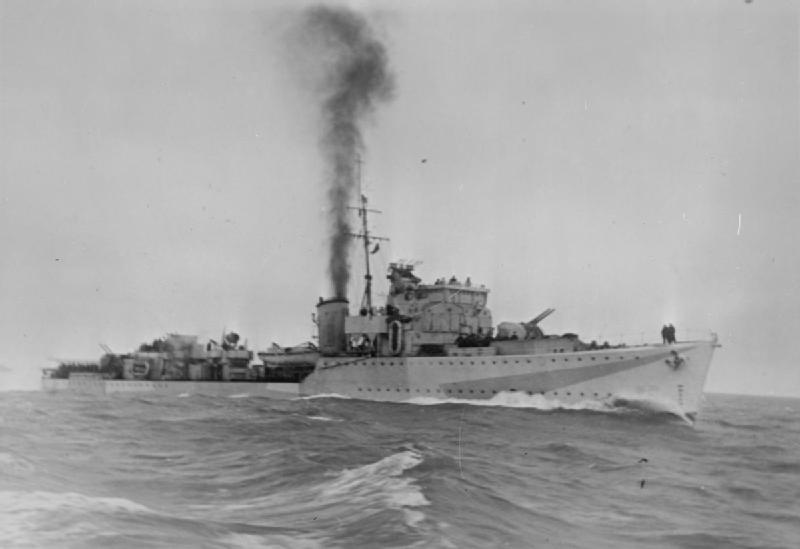
- HMS Quorn underway in 1940 (IWM)

History

United Kingdom
- Name: HMS Quorn
- Builder: J. Samuel White and Co. at Cowes, Isle of Wight
- Laid down: 22 August 1939
- Launched: 27 March 1940
- Commissioned: 21 September 1940
- Identification: Pennant number: L66
- Honours and awards: North Sea 1941–1945; English Channel 1942–1944; Adriatic 1944
- Fate: Sunk 3 August 1944 off the Normandy coast
- Badge: On a Field Red, a lion's gamb erased holding a hunting horn Gold.

General characteristics
- Class & type: Hunt-class destroyer
- Displacement: 1,000 long tons (1,016 t) standard; 1,340 long tons (1,362 t) full load
- Length: 85 m (278 ft 10 in) o/a
- Beam: 8.8 m (28 ft 10 in)
- Draught: 3.27 m (10 ft 9 in)
- Propulsion: 2 Admiralty 3-drum boilers; 2 shaft Parsons geared turbines, 19,000 shp
- Speed: 27.5 knots (31.6 mph; 50.9 km/h); 26 kn (30 mph; 48 km/h) full
- Range: 3,500 nmi (6,500 km) at 15 kn (28 km/h); 1,000 nmi (1,900 km) at 26 kn (48 km/h)
- Complement: 146
- Armament: 4 × QF 4 in Mark XVI guns on twin mounts Mk. XIX; 4 × QF 2 pdr Mk. VIII on quad mount MK.VII; 2 × 20 mm Oerlikons on single mounts P Mk. III; 40 depth charges, 2 throwers, 1 rack

HMS Quorn was a Hunt-class destroyer of the Royal Navy, built in 1940 and sunk off the Normandy coast on 3 August 1944. The class were named after British fox and stag hunts, in this case, the Quorn Hunt, which was originally based in Quorn Leicestershire.

Quorn was built by J. Samuel White and Co. at Cowes, Isle of Wight. A Type 1 Hunt-class destroyer, she was launched on 27 March 1940 and completed on 21 September 1940 with the pennant number L66. She was adopted by the civil community of Rushden, Northamptonshire, as part of Warship Week in 1942.

== Service history ==
=== 1941 ===
Quorn joined the 21st Destroyer Flotilla at Harwich. The flotilla undertook convoy protection, anti-shipping and patrol duties. Quorn stayed with the flotilla for the whole of her commission. In April Quorn was superficially damaged by two delay-action bombs, that exploded 20 metres (66 ft) from her port quarter.

In August whilst on passage from Harwich to Chatham, Quorn set off a mine 40 metres (130 ft) off her port bow. She was repaired at Chatham Dockyard, that was completed in September.

=== 1942 ===
In April Quorn hit another mine that blew a 9 by 15 feet (2.7 m × 4.6 m) hole in the port side of the ship. Two of ship's company were killed and one injured. Her No 1 boiler room was flooded and major structural damage sustained. She was towed to Harwich and then to Sheerness where repairs took 4 months to complete.

On 13 October Quorn was one of the five destroyers that intercepted the German auxiliary cruiser Komet in the English Channel. Komet was sunk and two M-class minesweepers were heavily damaged and set on fire. An hour later a second patrolling force of the same operation engaged a group of escort vessels, sinking an R boat, (minesweeper) and damaging a torpedo boat.

=== 1943 ===
North Sea convoy protection duties with the 21st Destroyer Flotilla.

=== 1944 ===
In June Quorn was an escort for convoys of personnel during Operation Neptune, the naval part of Operation Overlord, the Normandy Landings. On 3 August, she was hit and sunk by a human torpedo piloted by Oberfernschreibmeister Herbert Berrer of the Kriegsmarine during an attack on the British assault area by a force of E-boats, Linse explosive motorboats, human torpedoes and low flying aircraft. Those that survived the initial attack spent up to eight hours in the water before being rescued, and many of these died. One hundred and thirty of her crew were lost.

== Publications ==
- Colledge, J. J. & Warlow, Ben: Ships of the Royal Navy - The Complete Record of all Fighting Ships of the Royal Navy from the 15th Century to the Present. Newbury, UK: Casemate, 2010. ISBN 978-1-935149-07-1
- English, John: The Hunts - A history of the design, development and careers of the 86 destroyers of this class built for the Royal and Allied Navies during World War II. Cumbria: World Ship Society, 1987. ISBN 0-905617-44-4
- Gardiner, Robert; Chesneau, Roger, eds. (1980). Conway's All The World's Fighting Ships 1922–1946. London: Conway Maritime Press. ISBN 0-85177-146-7.
- Whitley, M. J.: Destroyers of World War Two – An International Encyclopedia: Arms and Armour, 1988. ISBN 0-85368-910-5
