= HMS Blencathra =

Destroyer of the Royal Navy

History

United Kingdom
- Name: HMS Blencathra
- Namesake: A fox hunt in Cumberland, England
- Ordered: 4 September 1939
- Builder: Cammell Laird, Birkenhead
- Laid down: 11 or 18 November 1939
- Launched: 6 August 1940
- Completed: 14 December 1940
- Commissioned: 14 December 1940
- Decommissioned: July 1948
- Identification: Pennant number: L24
- Honours and awards: North Sea 1941-1945; English Channel 1942-1944; Sicily 1943; Salerno 1943; Aegean 1943; Mediterranean 1944; Normandy 1944
- Fate: For disposal October 1956; Sold for scrapping late 1956; Scrapping began January 1957
- Badge: On a red field, a hunting horn and a crosier in saltire, both gold

General characteristics
- Class & type: Type II Hunt-class destroyer
- Displacement: 1,050 long tons (1,070 t) standard; 1,430 long tons (1,450 t) full load
- Length: 85.3 m (279 ft 10 in) o/a
- Beam: 9.6 m (31 ft 6 in)
- Draught: 2.51 m (8 ft 3 in)
- Propulsion: 2 Admiralty 3-drum boilers; 2 shaft Parsons geared turbines, 19,000 shp (14,170 kW)
- Speed: 27.5 knots (31.6 mph; 50.9 km/h); 26 kn (29.9 mph; 48.2 km/h) full
- Range: 3,500 nmi (6,500 km) at 15 kn (28 km/h); 1,000 nmi (1,850 km) at 26 kn (48 km/h)
- Complement: 164
- Armament: 4 × QF 4-inch (102 mm) Mark XVI guns on twin mounts Mk. XIX; 4 × QF 2-pounder (40 mm) Mk. VIII AA guns on quad mount MK.VII; 2 × 20 mm Oerlikon AA guns on single mounts P Mk. III; 50 depth charges, 2 throwers, 1 rack

HMS Blencathra (L24) was a Hunt-class destroyer of the Royal Navy in commission from 1940 to 1948. She was a member of the first subgroup of the class, and saw service through most of World War II.

== Construction and commissioning ==
Blencathra was ordered under the 1939 War Emergency Build Programme from Cammell Laird, Birkenhead, on 4 September 1939. She was laid down as Job Number V1048 on 11 or 18 November 1939 and launched on 6 August 1940. She was completed on 14 December 1940 and immediately commissioned.

== Service history ==
=== Home waters, 1941-1943 ===
Upon commissioning, Blencathra immediately began acceptance trials, followed by work-ups. With these completed, she reported for duty in January 1941 with the 1st Destroyer Flotilla, based at Portsmouth, to perform patrol and convoy defence duty in the English Channel. On 12 May 1941, she joined her sister ship Berkeley in escorting the heavy cruiser Berwick from Portsmouth to Rosyth, Scotland, where Berwick was to complete repairs, then returned to her routine duties. In March 1942, she was "adopted" by the community of Keswick, then in Cumberland, as the result of a successful Warship Week national savings campaign. On 14 March 1942, she took part in an unsuccessful attempt to intercept the German merchant raider Michel before Michel could break out into the North Atlantic Ocean, and suffered damage when Michel fired on her. On 18 June 1942, German aircraft damaged her with cannon fire and near misses by bombs when the convoy she was escorting in the English Channel came under air attack.

In the second half of 1942, Blencathra was transferred to the 21st Destroyer Flotilla – to which her sister ships Cattistock, Cottesmore, Fernie, Garth, Holderness, Mendip, Meynell, and Pytchley also were assigned – based at Sheerness, for duty escorting convoys between the Thames Estuary and the Forth Estuary. While she was escorting Convoy FS 1074 on 28 March 1943 German E-boats attacked, but the destroyer Warwick drove them off.

=== Mediterranean, 1943 ===
In May 1943, the Royal Navy selected Blencathra for participation in Operation Husky, the Allied invasion of Sicily planned for July 1943, and she began preparations for foreign service. In June 1943 she proceeded from Harwich to the River Clyde, where on 21 June 1943 she joined the light cruiser Uganda, the destroyers Viceroy, Wallace, Witherington, and Woolston, and the escort destroyers Arrow, Blankney, Brecon, Brissenden, Hambledon, Ledbury, and Mendip as escort for the military Convoy WS 31/KMF 17 for the Clyde-Gibraltar leg of its voyage. On 26 June 1943, the convoys divided and the Gibraltar-based destroyers Amazon, Bulldog, and Foxhound and escort destroyer Blackmore took over the escort of WS 31 as it continued its voyage to Freetown, Sierra Leone, on its way to the Middle East, while Blencanthra and her consorts pressed on to Gibraltar as the escort of KMF 17, arriving there on 28 June 1943.

While at Gibraltar in early July 1943, Blencathra was transferred to the 58th Destroyer Division of the Mediterranean Fleet, assigned to escort military convoys to Sicily for the amphibious landings there. After pre-invasion exercises, she escorted assault convoys on 9 July 1943 and, after they arrived at the invasion beaches on 10 July 1943, the first day of the invasion, was assigned to defense of the beachhead and of later convoys bringing in reinforcements and supplies.

In August 1943, Blencathra and the rest of the 58th Destroyer Division was based at Malta and assigned to patrol and escort duty in the central Mediterranean Sea. During the month, she was selected to participate in Operation Avalanche, the Allied landings at Salerno on the mainland of Italy planned for September 1943. On 9 September 1943, she took part in the initial Salerno landings, then protected the beachhead and convoys bringing in reinforcements and supplies.

Released from Operation Avalanche in October 1943, Blencathra next operated in the Aegean Sea to assist in the unsuccessful Allied attempt to defend Italian-held islands there against invasion by German forces during the Dodecanese Campaign, sheltering in neutral Turkish waters at night to avoid German air attack. On 8 October 1943 she conducted a search for German craft carrying troops to the islands, and on 27 October 1943 she joined her sister ship Exmoor and the destroyer Pathfinder in escorting the light cruiser Aurora as the cruiser deployed to the Aegean Sea to relieve the light cruiser Phoebe on interception duty there. On 9 November 1943, Blencathra conducted an interception patrol off Amorgas in company with her sister ship Exmoor and the destroyer Fury. On 13 November 1943 she sortied from Alexandria, Egypt, to support Allied military operations ashore on the Aegean islands and on 14 November 1943 she joined her sister ship Aldenham and the destroyer Penn in bombarding German positions at Alinda Bay on Leros. On 19 November 1943 she towed her sister ship Rockwood, which had suffered damage when hit by a German glide bomb, from Turkish waters to Alexandria.

After the Dodecanese Campaign ended in an Allied defeat, Blencathra and the rest of the 58th Destroyer Division were based at Alexandria in December 1943 for patrol and escort duties in the Eastern Mediterranean.

=== Mediterranean, 1944 ===
In January 1944, the 58th Destroyer Division was transferred to Malta, where it conducted patrols and escorted convoys in the central Mediterranean, including the protection of shipping supporting Operation Shingle, the Allied invasion at Anzio and Nettuno, Italy.

On 9 March 1944, the 58th Destroyer Division deployed for antisubmarine operations in support of Shingle, and on 10 March 1944 Blencathra joined her sister ships Blankney, Brecon, and Exmoor, the destroyer Urchin, and the United States Navy destroyer USS Madison in a depth-charge attack in the Tyrrhenian Sea south of Ostia, Italy, that forced the German submarine U-450 to the surface. U-450 scuttled herself at position 41°11′00″N 012°27′00″E, and Urchin rescued her entire crew.

On 29 March 1944, Blencathra, Hambledon, and their sister ship Wilton departed Naples to assist the destroyers Laforey, Tumult, and Ulster in hunting the German submarine U-223, which they had detected with asdic in the Tyrrhenian Sea northeast of Palermo, Sicily, near Filicudi, 135 nautical miles (250 km) south of Naples. They attacked U-223 with depth charges until Laforey ordered them to halt, then continued to track U-223 for several hours until she was forced to surface in the early hours of 30 March 1944 after 27 hours of attack by depth charges and Hedgehog antisubmarine mortars. Blencathra joined the other ships in illuminating U-223 with searchlights and sinking her with gunfire at position 38°48′00″N 014°10′00″E with the loss of 23 of the submarine's crew, leaving 27 survivors, but not before U-223 sank Laforey with an acoustic torpedo with the loss of 182 lives, leaving 69 survivors.

In April 1944, the Royal Navy selected Blencathra, Hambledon, and Mendip to participate in Operation Neptune, the initial assault phase of the Allied invasion of Normandy scheduled for early June 1944. Accordingly, Hambledon departed the Mediterranean that month and proceeded to the United Kingdom.

=== Home waters, 1944-1945 ===
In May 1944, Blencathra was assigned to the 21st Destroyer Flotilla at Sheerness and began exercises to prepare for the Normandy invasion. In early June 1944, she joined the 113th Escort Group – consisting of the frigates Waldegrave and Whitaker and the sloops Hart and Whimbrel – and steamed with it to Milford Haven, Wales, from which the group was to escort Convoy EBP 2 – five troop transports carrying United States Army troops for discharge on Utah Beach, the headquarters ship for Mulberry B, and three smaller merchant ships – to Normandy. The landings were postponed 24 hours to 6 June 1944 due to bad weather, but the convoy steamed out of the Bristol Channel that day protected by the 113th Escort Group and the frigates Spragge and Stockham of the 112th Escort Group, passed through the Solent on 7 June 1944, and arrived off Utah Beach on 8 June 1944. Blencathra then steamed to Plymouth and, based there with Hambledon and Mendip, defended convoys carrying reinforcements and supplies to the Normandy beachheads until released from such duties on 30 June 1944.

After the termination of Operation Neptune, Blencathra remained in the English Channel to patrol, protect convoys, and support military operations in France through August 1944. On 3 August 1944 she suffered damage when she attempted to salvage a captured German human torpedo and its scuttling charge detonated.

In September 1944, the Royal Navy assigned Blencathra to the 21st Destroyer Flotilla at Sheerness for patrol and convoy defence operations in the North Sea under the control of the Nore Command, and she continued these operations until Germany surrendered in early May 1945. After that, she operated in support of re-occupation forces and visited ports in the United Kingdom and on the European continent until 15 August 1945, when she suffered damage in a collision with the merchant ship Willowdale. After repairs and the removal of her armament and other modifications at the dockyard at Rosyth, Blencathra reentered service in October 1945 as a target ship in the North Sea for the training of aircrews in the identification and targeting of ships. Withdrawn from this duty in June 1948, she was decommissioned and placed in reserve in July 1948.

== Reserve and disposal ==
Blencathra was placed in reserve in the Harwich Division of the Reserve Fleet in 1948. In April 1950, it was proposed that the United Kingdom sell her to Norway, but the sale never occurred. In 1953 she was transferred to the Reserve Fleet's Barrow-in-Furness Division. She was among ten Hunt-class escort destroyers placed on the disposal list in October 1956 and was sold to the British Iron & Steel Corporation (BISCO) for scrapping before the end of the year. BISCO allocated her to Thos. W. Ward to be broken up. Taken under tow, she arrived at Ward's yard on 2 January 1957 and was scrapped.
