= HMS Hambledon (L37) =

Destroyer of the Royal Navy

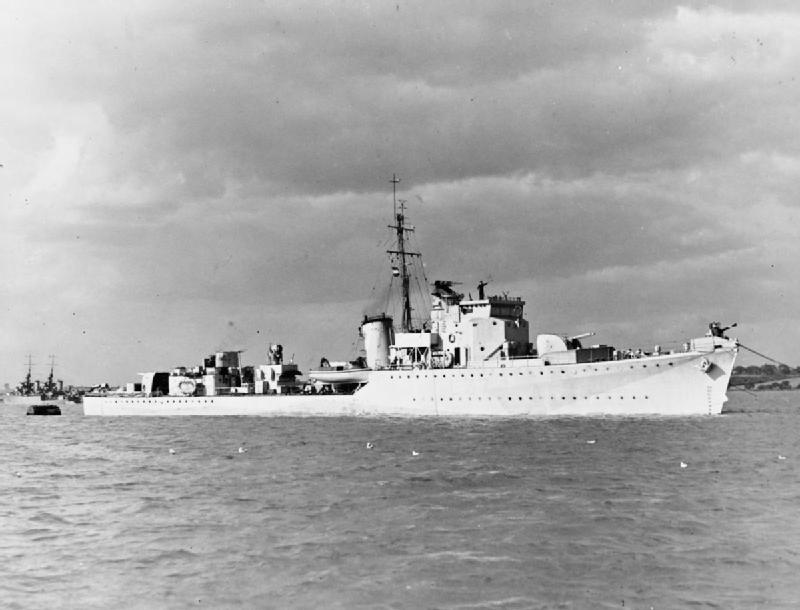
- HMS Hambledon during World War II.

History

United Kingdom
- Name: HMS Hambledon
- Namesake: A fox hunt in Hampshire, England
- Ordered: 21 March 1939
- Builder: Swan Hunter, Newcastle upon Tyne or Wallsend
- Laid down: 8 or 9 June 1939
- Launched: 12 December 1939
- Completed: 8 June 1940
- Commissioned: 8 June 1940
- Decommissioned: December 1945
- Identification: Pennant number: L37
- Honours and awards: Battle honours for: North Sea 1941–1944; English Channel 1943; Sicily 1943; Salerno 1943; Aegean 1944; Mediterranean 1944; Normandy 1944
- Fate: Scrapped 1957
- Badge: On a red field, a gold fox's mask and two gold brushes in saltire

General characteristics
- Class & type: Hunt-class destroyer
- Displacement: 1,000 long tons (1,016 t) standard; 1,340 long tons (1,362 t) full load
- Length: 280 ft (85 m)
- Beam: 29 ft (8.8 m)
- Draught: 10 ft 9 in (3.28 m)
- Propulsion: Two x Admiralty 3 drum boilers; Two shaft Parsons geared turbines; 19,000 shp
- Speed: 27½ kn (26 knots full)
- Range: 3,500 nmi (6,480 km) at 15 knots (28 km/h) / 1,000 nmi (2,000 km) at 26 knots (48 km/h)
- Complement: 146
- Armament: 4 × QF 4-inch (102 mm) Mark XVI guns on twin mounts Mk. XIX; 4 × QF 2-pounder (40 mm) Mk VIII AA guns on quad mount MK.VII; 2 × 20-mm Oerlikon AA guns on single mounts P Mk. III; 40 depth charges, 2 throwers, 1 rack

The second HMS Hambledon was a Hunt-class destroyer of the Royal Navy in commission from 1940 to 1945. She was a member of the first subgroup of the class, and saw service throughout World War II.

== Construction and commissioning ==
Hambledon was ordered under the 1939 Naval Building Programme from Swan Hunter, Newcastle upon Tyne, on 21 March 1939. She was laid down on 8 or 9 June 1939 and launched on 12 December 1939. She was completed on 8 June 1940, and immediately commissioned with the pennant number L37.

== Service history ==
=== Home waters, 1940 ===
Upon commissioning, Hambledon immediately began acceptance trials, which she completed successfully later in June 1940. She then proceeded to Portland for work-ups, during which she deployed with the British destroyers Atherstone, Fernie, Inglefield, and Imogen to escort the minelayers Menestheus, Port Napier, Port Quebec, and Southern Prince of the 1st Minelaying Squadron as they laid the first section of the Northern Barrage north of North Rona in Operation SN1. On 12 July 1940, increased German activity in the English Channel prompted the Royal Navy to transfer her work-ups north to Scapa Flow in the Orkney Islands, and she completed them there later in July 1940 and was assigned to a flotilla based at Sheerness, charged with patrol and convoy defence duties in the English Channel and along the east coast of Great Britain. On 31 August 1940 she and her sister ship Garth rendered assistance to Royal Navy ships that had struck mines in the North Sea off the coast of the Netherlands, rescuing the survivors of the sunken destroyer Esk and standing by the badly damaged destroyer Express, which had lost her bow in a mine explosion, until tugs arrived to tow her to safety.

In October 1940, Hambledon was selected to participate in Operation Lucid, a plan to use fire ships to attack German invasion barges in ports in northern France, but bad weather forced the Royal Navy to abort the operation on several occasions and it was never carried out. On 7 October 1940, during operations related to Lucid, she suffered major damage to her after structure from the explosion of an acoustic mine in the English Channel off South Foreland at position 51°08′00″N 001°21′00″E, losing one rating killed and two injured. The destroyer Vesper towed her to Sheerness, and she was taken to Chatham Dockyard for repairs, which lasted until May 1941, and the installation of Type 285 fire-control radar for her armament.

=== Home waters and Atlantic, 1941–1943 ===
In May 1941, with her repairs completed, Hambledon passed her post-repair trials and on 14 May 1941 took up convoy escort and anti-invasion patrol duties in the North Sea with the 16th Destroyer Flotilla, based at Harwich, England, which she continued through October 1942. In March 1942 she was "adopted" by Hambledon Rural District Council as the result of a successful Warship Week national savings campaign run by nine of the Surrey villages that formed part of the then Hambledon Rural District council.

When convoy traffic along the east coast of Great Britain was reduced to free escorts for use elsewhere, Hambledon was selected for detached service in October 1942. Accordingly, in November 1942 she deployed to the North Atlantic Ocean to escort convoys bringing troops and equipment to Gibraltar for Operation Torch, the Allied amphibious invasion of North Africa, that month, and suffered slight damage from a torpedo explosion on 12 November 1942. In December 1942 she returned to her escort and patrol duties at Harwich, which in 1943 began to include interception of German S-boat – known to the Allies as "E-boat" – motor torpedo boats in the North Sea to prevent them from attacking Allied convoys.

=== Mediterranean, 1943 ===
In June 1943, the Royal Navy selected Hambledon for participation in Operation Husky, the Allied invasion of Sicily, and transferred her to the 58th Destroyer Division. She proceeded from Harwich to the River Clyde, where on 21 June 1943 she joined the light cruiser Uganda, the destroyers Viceroy, Wallace, Witherington, and Woolston, and the escort destroyers Arrow, Blankney, Blencathra, Brecon, Brissenden, Ledbury, and Mendip as escort for the military Convoy WS 31/KMF 17 for the Clyde-Gibraltar leg of its voyage. On 26 June 1943, the convoys divided and the Gibraltar-based destroyers Amazon, Bulldog, and Foxhound and escort destroyer Blackmore took over the escort of WS 31 as it continued its voyage to Freetown, Sierra Leone, on its way to the Middle East, while Blencanthra and her consorts pressed on to Gibraltar as the escort of KMF 17, arriving there on 28 June 1943.

While at Gibraltar, Hambledon was transferred to Escort Group V, in which she joined Blankney, Blencathra, Brecon, and Brissenden. The escort group escorted Convoy KMF 18, which departed Gibraltar on 7 July 1943 bound for the Sicily invasion, and, detaching temporarily on 9 July 1943 to refuel, brought the convoy to the BARK WEST assault area on 10 July 1943, the day of the initial landings. Hambledon then operated on patrol and escort duty in support of Husky until being released from the operation on 31 July 1943 and reassigned to the 58th Destroyer Division based at Malta for patrol and escort duty in the central Mediterranean Sea.

In August 1943, Hambledon was selected to carry Admiral of the Fleet Andrew Cunningham for Operation Avalanche, the Allied landings at Salerno on the mainland of Italy planned for September 1943. On 9 September 1943, she embarked Cunningham and United States Army General Dwight D. Eisenhower at Bizerta, Tunisia, to take them to Malta to observe the surrender of the Italian Royal Navy's battlefleet there, and was present when the surrender took place on 10 September 1943. She departed Malta later that day to take part in the Salerno landings, with Cunningham embarked.

Released from Operation Avalanche in October 1943, Hambledon next operated in the Aegean Sea to assist in the unsuccessful Allied attempt to defend the Italian-held islands of Leros and Kos against invasion by German forces during the Dodecanese Campaign. After the campaign ended in an Allied defeat, Hambledon resumed patrol and convoy defence operations in the central Mediterranean in November 1943.

=== Mediterranean, 1944 ===
Early in 1944, Hambledon transferred to Naples, Italy, from which she patrolled the west coast of Italy and supported Allied ground operations. On 29 March 1944, Hambledon, Blencathra, and their sister ship Wilton departed Naples to assist the destroyers Laforey, Tumult, and Ulster in hunting the German submarine U-223, which they had detected with asdic in the Tyrrhenian Sea northeast of Palermo, Sicily, near Filicudi, 135 nautical miles (250 km) south of Naples. They attacked U-223 with depth charges until Laforey ordered them to halt, then continued to track U-223 for several hours until she was forced to surface in the early hours of 30 March 1944 after 27 hours of attack by depth charges and Hedgehog antisubmarine mortars. Hambledon joined the other ships in illuminating U-223 with searchlights and sinking her with gunfire at position 38°48′00″N 014°10′00″E with the loss of 23 of the submarine's crew, leaving 27 survivors, but not before U-223 sank Laforey with an acoustic torpedo with the loss of 182 lives, leaving 69 survivors. Hambledon assisted in rescuing Laforey's survivors, then took aboard 14 of U-223's survivors, two of whom died before Hambledon could reach port.

In April 1944, the Royal Navy selected Hambledon, Blencathra, and Mendip to participate in Operation Neptune, the initial assault phase of the Allied invasion of Normandy scheduled for early June 1944. Accordingly, Hambledon departed Naples in May 1944 bound for the United Kingdom.

=== Home waters, 1944–1945 ===
Upon arrival in the United Kingdom in May 1944, Hambledon was assigned to the 21st Destroyer Flotilla at Sheerness, designated to escort assault Convoy G16 to the coast of Normandy for the initial landing and then to remain off the beachhead to defend it from German naval attack as part of Force G. In early June 1944, she joined the other forces allocated to Force G in the west Solent.

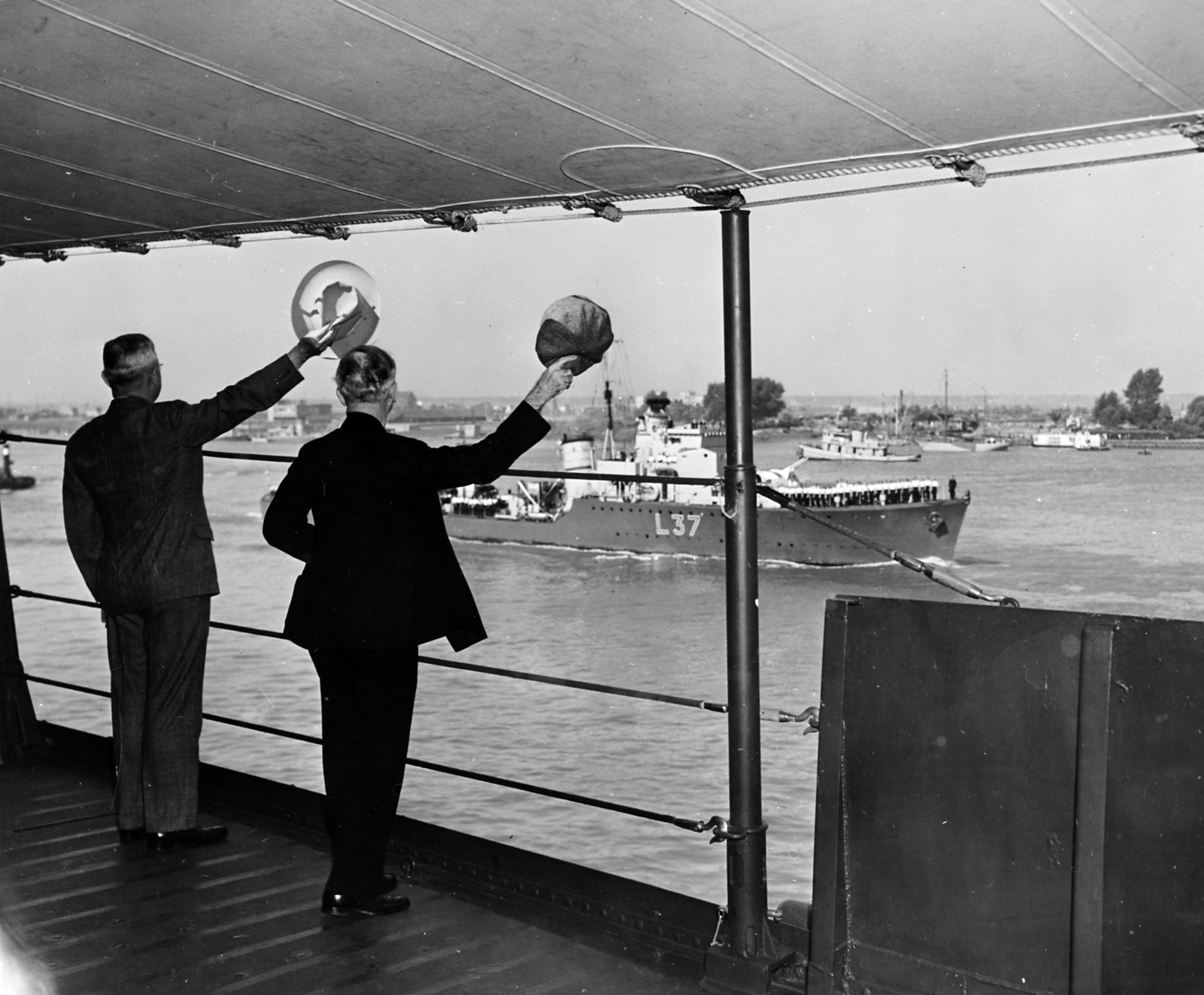
U.S. President Harry S. Truman and Secretary of State James F. Byrnes wave at HMS Hambledon while on board USS Augusta on the River Scheldt as they head to the Potsdam Conference on 15 July 1945

After the landings were delayed from 5 to 6 June due to bad weather, Hambledon departed for the landings along with the escort destroyer Albrighton on 5 June 1944 as escort for Convoy G16, which consisted of nine infantry landing craft and two rescue craft. The convoy arrived off Gold Beach on 6 June 1944 and put its troops ashore, with Hambledon supporting the landing by bombarding German shore defences. Later in the day, Hambledon steamed back to the Solent to escort Convoy EBP 2 bringing reinforcements and supplies to the beachhead, fighting an action against German S-boats south of the Isle of Wight along the way. On 7 June 1944, she joined the 112th Escort Group – made up of the frigates Spragge and Stockham and the sloop Magpie – to escort EBP 2 – five troop transports carrying United States Army troops for discharge on Utah Beach, the headquarters ship for Mulberry B, and three smaller merchant ships – to Utah Beach, where the convoy arrived on 8 June 1944. Later that day, she was released from convoy escort duty and assigned to patrol and interception duties to defend the beachhead from German naval attack.

In July 1944, Hambledon was released from beachhead defence duties and reported to the 16th Destroyer Flotilla at Harwich for convoy defence operations in the North Sea and English Channel, which she conducted until March 1945. In March 1945, she was reassigned to escort convoys crossing the North Sea between the United Kingdom and ports in Belgium and the Netherlands and to patrol duties in the Nore Command and Dover areas. In April 1945, her focus again shifted to convoy defence and patrol operations in the southern North Sea and English Channel, and on 12 April 1945 she and the frigate Ekins fought an action with German S-boats which were laying mines off Flushing.

After Germany surrendered in early May 1945, Hambledon was assigned to the Nore Local Flotilla. From June to August 1945 she operated on training duties and in support of re-occupation forces. She remained in the Nore Command until decommissioned and placed in reserve in December 1945.

== Reserve and disposal ==
Hambledon was in reserve in the Harwich Division of the Reserve Fleet from 1946 until 1953, when she was transferred to Barrow-in-Furness. In 1955 she was stripped, hulked, and placed on the disposal list. The United Kingdom sold her in August 1957 to BISCO for scrapping by Clayton and Davie at Dunston-on-Tyne. Taken under tow, she arrived at the shipbreaker's yard in September 1957 and was scrapped.

== Publications ==
- Colledge, J. J.; Warlow, Ben (2006) [1969]. Ships of the Royal Navy: The Complete Record of All Fighting Ships of the Royal Navy from the 15th Century to the Present (3rd Rev ed.). London: Chatham Publishing. ISBN 978-1-86176-281-8. OCLC 67375475.
- Naval History: HMS HAMBLEDON (L 37) - Type I, Hunt-class Escort Destroyer
- uboat.net HMS Hambledon (L 37)
