= HMS Spragge (K572) =

Frigate of the Royal Navy

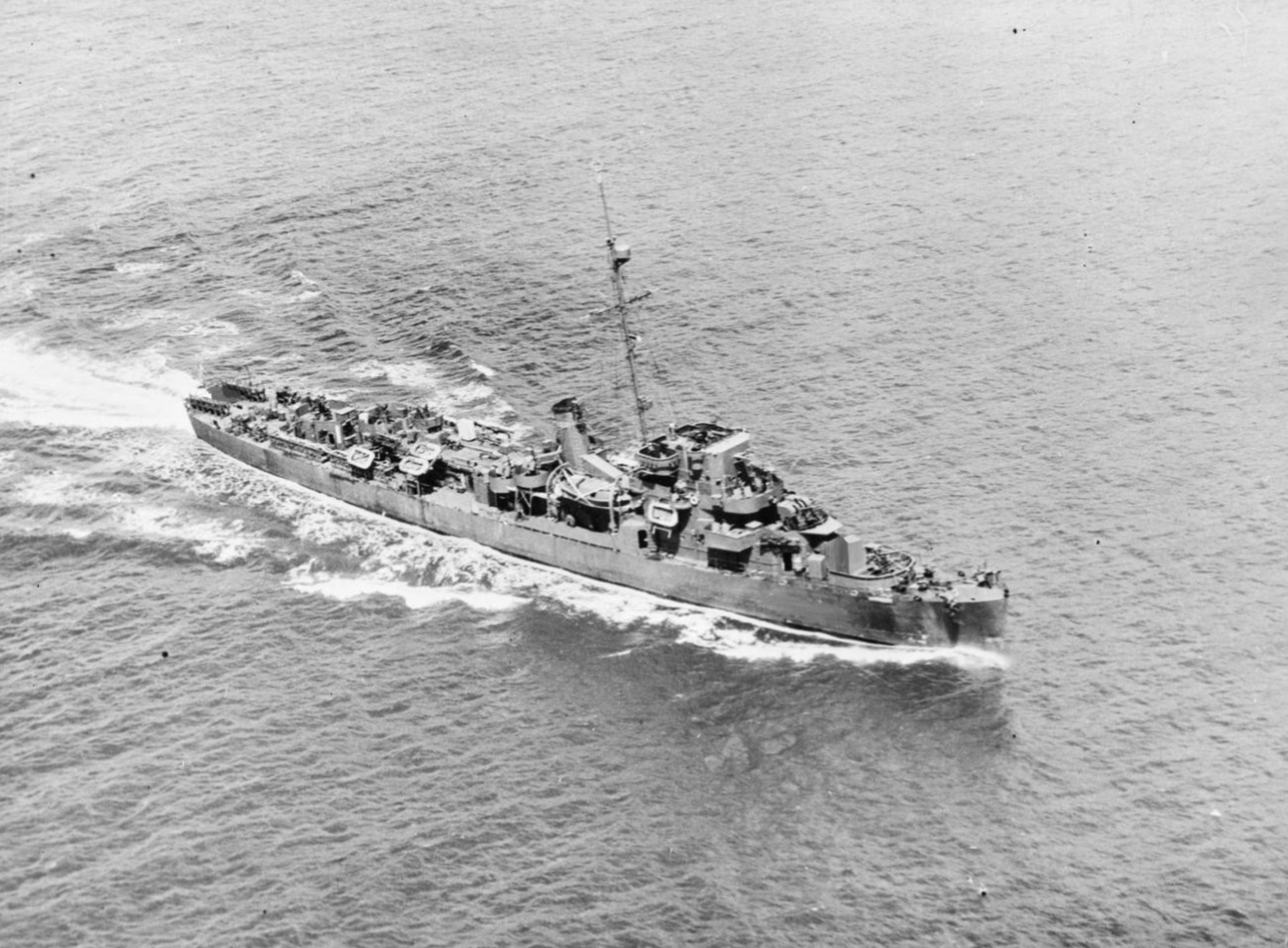

History

United States
- Name: unnamed (DE-563)
- Builder: Bethlehem-Hingham Shipyard, Hingham, Massachusetts
- Laid down: 15 September 1943
- Launched: 16 October 1943
- Completed: 14 January 1944
- Fate: Transferred to United Kingdom 14 January 1944
- Acquired: Returned by United Kingdom 28 February 1946
- Fate: Sold for scrapping 18 November 1947

United Kingdom
- Name: HMS Spragge (K572)
- Namesake: Admiral Sir Edward Spragge (1620-1673), English naval officer who fought in the Anglo-Dutch Wars
- Acquired: 14 January 1944
- Commissioned: 14 January 1944
- Decommissioned: 28 February 1946
- Identification: Pennant number K572
- Honours and awards: Battle honours for Normandy 1944 and English Channel 1944-1945
- Fate: Returned to United States 28 February 1946

General characteristics
- Displacement: 1,400 long tons (1,422 t)
- Length: 306 ft (93 m)
- Beam: 36.75 ft (11.2 m)
- Draught: 9 ft (2.7 m)
- Propulsion: Two Foster-Wheeler Express "D"-type water-tube boilers; GE 13,500 shp (10,070 kW) steam turbines and generators (9,200 kW); Electric motors for 12,000 shp (8,900 kW); Two shafts
- Speed: 24 knots (44 km/h)
- Range: 5,500 nautical miles (10,200 km) at 15 knots (28 km/h)
- Complement: 186
- Sensors & processing systems: SA & SL type radars; Type 144 series Asdic; MF Direction Finding antenna; HF Direction Finding Type FH 4 antenna
- Armament: 3 × 3 in (76 mm) /50 Mk.22 guns; 1 × twin Bofors 40 mm mount Mk.I; 7–16 × 20 mm Oerlikon guns; Mark 10 Hedgehog antisubmarine mortar; Depth charges; QF 2-pounder naval gun

The fourth HMS Spragge (K572) and third ship of the name to enter service was a British Captain-class frigate of the Royal Navy in commission during World War II. Originally constructed as a United States Navy Buckley-class destroyer escort, she served in the Royal Navy from 1944 to 1946.

== Construction and transfer ==
The ship was laid down as the unnamed U.S. Navy destroyer escort DE-563 by Bethlehem-Hingham Shipyard, Inc., in Hingham, Massachusetts, on 15 September 1943 and launched on 16 October 1943. She was transferred to the United Kingdom upon completion on 14 January 1944.

== Service history ==
=== World War II ===
Commissioned into service in the Royal Navy as the frigate HMS Spragge (K572) on 14 January 1944 simultaneously with her transfer, the ship commenced acceptance trials, followed by shakedown, with a Royal Canadian Navy crew. Upon completion of shakedown, she proceeded to St. John's in the Dominion of Newfoundland, where she joined a convoy for her transatlantic crossing to the United Kingdom. She arrived at Derry – also known as Londonderry – in Northern Ireland in February 1944, and on 28 February 1944 her Royal Navy crew reported aboard at Lisahally, replacing the Canadian personnel. In March 1944 she entered a shipyard to undergo modifications for Royal Navy service.

With her modifications complete, Spragge steamed to Tobermory on the Isle of Mull in Scotland in April 1944 for work-ups with her new crew. She suffered a tragedy during these when the forward falls of the ship's whaleboat failed while she was underway, hurling a rating into the sea. Although an officer and a senior rating jumped into the water to save the man, his body was not recovered.

Completing her workups, Spragge proceeded in May 1944 to Belfast, Northern Ireland, to take up her operational duties, assigned to duty with the 113th Escort Group – in which she joined her sister ship HMS Hotham, the escort destroyer HMS Hambledon, and the sloops HMS Hind and HMS Magpie – and serving as the group's flagship. In May, the group was assigned to escort Allied landing forces during Operation Neptune, the initial assault of the upcoming invasion of Normandy scheduled for June 1944, as well as to defend convoys bringing supplies and reinforcements to the beachhead thereafter. Accordingly, Spragge steamed to Milford Haven, Wales, where the 113th Escort Group joined the 112th Escort Group – consisting of Spragge's sister ships HMS Waldegrave and HMS Whitaker, the escort destroyer HMS Blencathra, and the sloops HMS Hart and HMS Whimbrel – in an assignment to escort Convoy EBP2 – five troop transports carrying United States Army troops for discharge on Utah Beach, the headquarters ship for Mulberry B, and three smaller merchant ships. The landings were postponed 24 hours to 6 June 1944 due to bad weather, but the convoy steamed out of the Bristol Channel that day protected by the two escort groups, passed through The Solent on 7 June 1944, and arrived off Utah Beach on 8 June 1944, with Spragge present there when the troops on the beach came under unexpected and particularly heavy fire that day. Spragge steamed to Plymouth on 9 June 1944 and after that continued to escort convoys in support of Operation Neptune until the operation came to an end on 24 June. After that, she was assigned to the Plymouth Command for convoy escort duties in the English Channel through August 1944.

In September 1944, with attacks by German submarines and S-boat – known to the Allies as "E-boat" – motor torpedo boats on Allied convoys to France and the Netherlands on the rise, Spragge was reassigned to the Portsmouth Command to operate on convoy escort duties with her sister ships HMS Hargood, HMS Hotham, and HMS Waldegrave in the English Channel and in the North Sea as far as north as the coast of the Netherlands. She continued in these duties until February 1945, when she collided with a landing craft during a voyage from Walcheren to the United Kingdom, injuring one rating and holing her bow, requiring her to undergo several weeks of repairs.

After completing repairs, Spragge returned to service with the 1st Destroyer Flotilla at Portsmouth in May 1945. After Germany surrendered in early May 1945, she was selected for conversion into a floating power station. Between June and August 1945 – when the armistice with Japan brought World War II to a close – she underwent conversion for her new role, which involved removal of all of her armament and modifications to her electrical system, at Portsmouth Dockyard.

=== Post-war ===
In September 1945, Spragge was assigned to duty in the British Pacific Fleet, and plans to use her as a floating power station were cancelled. Her armament was reinstalled and her electrical system again modified to restore its ability to provide normal power for the operation of the ship.

In company with Hotham, Spragge steamed from the United Kingdom to Singapore in October 1945. Hotham took up duties as a floating power station for the dockyard there, but Spragge continued alone in November 1945 to Hong Kong. Based there, she carried out duties for the British Pacific Fleet – for a frigate typically consisting of patrolling the sea lanes in East Asia and transporting personnel and supplies to and between military garrisons in French Indochina, China, and Japan – until January 1946, when the Royal Navy selected her for return to the U.S. Navy.

In February 1946, the Royal Navy steamed Spragge to Subic Bay on Luzon in the Philippine Islands. There it decommissioned her and simultaneously returned her to the U.S. Navy on 28 February 1946.

== Disposal ==
The United States sold Spragge on 18 November 1947 for scrapping.

In 1949, its two powerful steam turbine generators were salvaged as electric utility power generators for the Visayan Electric Company in Cebu, Philippines.
