= German submarine U-450 =

German world war II submarine

- U-995, a Type VIIC U-boat at the German navy memorial at Laboe. U-450 was almost identical

History

Nazi Germany
- Name: U-450
- Ordered: 21 November 1940
- Builder: Schichau-Werke, Danzig
- Yard number: 1521
- Laid down: 22 July 1941
- Launched: 4 July 1942
- Commissioned: 12 September 1942
- Fate: Sunk on 10 March 1944

General characteristics
- Class & type: Type VIIC submarine
- Displacement: 769 tonnes (757 long tons) surfaced; 871 t (857 long tons) submerged
- Length: 67.10 m (220 ft 2 in) o/a; 50.50 m (165 ft 8 in) pressure hull
- Beam: 6.20 m (20 ft 4 in) o/a; 4.70 m (15 ft 5 in) pressure hull
- Height: 9.60 m (31 ft 6 in)
- Draught: 4.74 m (15 ft 7 in)
- Installed power: 2,800–3,200 PS (2,100–2,400 kW; 2,800–3,200 bhp) (diesels); 750 PS (550 kW; 740 shp) (electric)
- Propulsion: 2 shafts; 2 × diesel engines; 2 × electric motors
- Speed: 17.7 knots (32.8 km/h; 20.4 mph) surfaced; 7.6 knots (14.1 km/h; 8.7 mph) submerged
- Range: 8,500 nmi (15,700 km; 9,800 mi) at 10 knots (19 km/h; 12 mph) surfaced; 80 nmi (150 km; 92 mi) at 4 knots (7.4 km/h; 4.6 mph) submerged
- Test depth: 230 m (750 ft); Crush depth: 250–295 m (820–968 ft)
- Complement: 4 officers, 40–56 enlisted
- Armament: 5 × 53.3 cm (21 in) torpedo tubes (four bow, one stern); 14 × torpedoes; 1 × 8.8 cm (3.46 in) deck gun (220 rounds); 1 x 2 cm (0.79 in) C/30 AA gun

Service record
- Part of: 8th U-boat Flotilla; 12 September 1942 – 31 May 1943; 9th U-boat Flotilla; 1 June – 30 November 1943; 29th U-boat Flotilla; 1 December 1943 – 10 March 1944
- Identification codes: M 49 679
- Commanders: Oblt.z.S. Kurt Böhme; 12 September 1942 – 10 March 1944
- Operations: 3 patrols: 1st patrol: a. 27 May – 22 June 1943; b. 18 – 19 September 1943; c. 29 – 30 September 1943; d. 7 – 8 October 1943; 2nd patrol: a. 14 – 15 October 1943; b. 17 October – 8 November 1943; 3rd patrol: 14 February – 10 March 1944
- Victories: None

German submarine U-450 was a Type VIIC U-boat in the service of Nazi Germany during World War II.

== Design ==
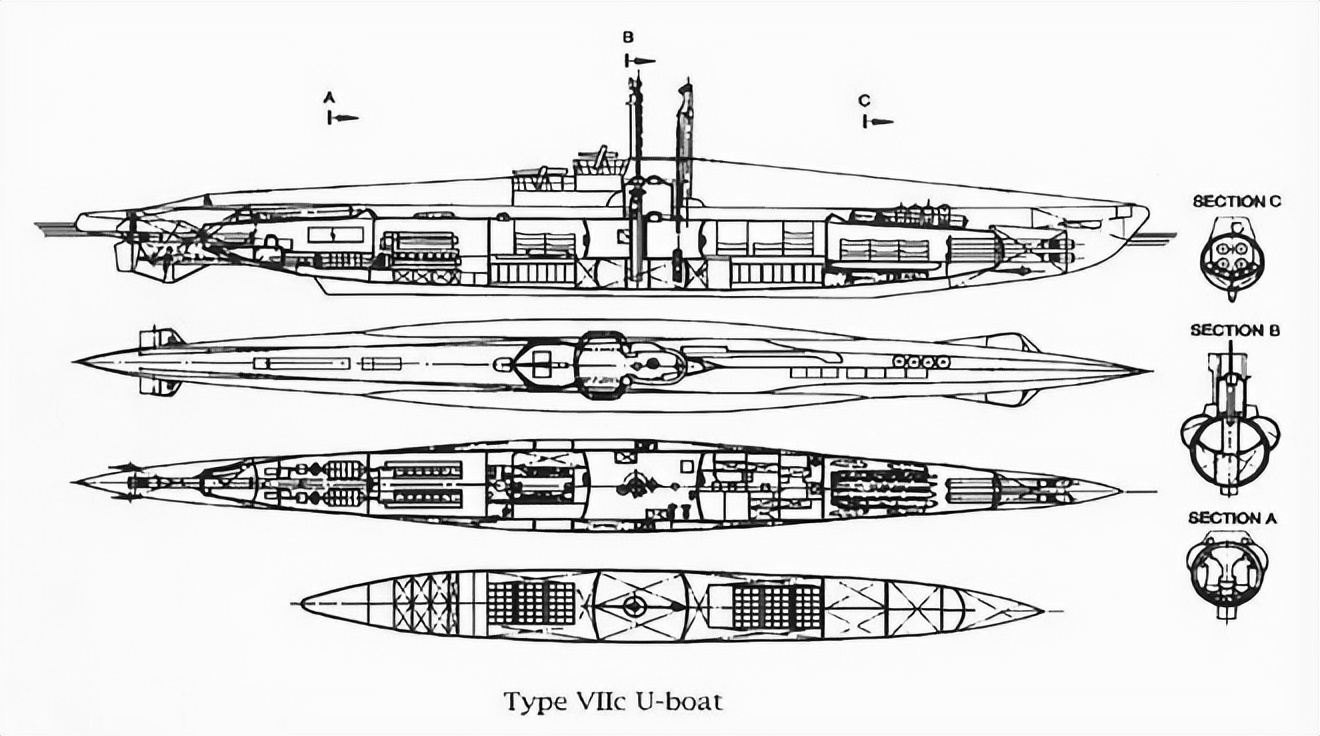
A cross-section of a Type VIIC submarine

German Type VIIC submarines were preceded by the shorter Type VIIB submarines. U-450 had a displacement of 769 tonnes (757 long tons) when at the surface and 871 tonnes (857 long tons) while submerged. She had a total length of 67.10 m (220 ft 2 in), a pressure hull length of 50.50 m (165 ft 8 in), a beam of 6.20 m (20 ft 4 in), a height of 9.60 m (31 ft 6 in), and a draught of 4.74 m (15 ft 7 in). The submarine was powered by two Germaniawerft F46 four-stroke, six-cylinder supercharged diesel engines producing a total of 2,800 to 3,200 metric horsepower (2,060 to 2,350 kW; 2,760 to 3,160 shp) for use while surfaced, two AEG GU 460/8–27 double-acting electric motors producing a total of 750 metric horsepower (550 kW; 740 shp) for use while submerged. She had two shafts and two 1.23 m (4 ft) propellers. The boat was capable of operating at depths of up to 230 metres (750 ft).

The submarine had a maximum surface speed of 17.7 knots (32.8 km/h; 20.4 mph) and a maximum submerged speed of 7.6 knots (14.1 km/h; 8.7 mph). When submerged, the boat could operate for 80 nautical miles (150 km; 92 mi) at 4 knots (7.4 km/h; 4.6 mph); when surfaced, she could travel 8,500 nautical miles (15,700 km; 9,800 mi) at 10 knots (19 km/h; 12 mph). U-450 was fitted with five 53.3 cm (21 in) torpedo tubes (four fitted at the bow and one at the stern), fourteen torpedoes, one 8.8 cm (3.46 in) SK C/35 naval gun, 220 rounds, and a 2 cm (0.79 in) C/30 anti-aircraft gun. The boat had a complement of between forty-four and sixty.

== Service history ==
The submarine was laid down on 22 July 1941 in Danzig, Germany (now Poland). She was launched on 4 July 1942 and commissioned on 12 September that year. During her career with the Kriegsmarine, U-450 never sank any ships.

=== Patrols ===
On 27 May 1943, three days after she was redesignated from a training vessel to a front-line service boat, U-450 set out for her first patrol from Kiel, the home base of the 9th U-boat Flotilla under the command of Oberleutnant zur See Kurt Böhme. As the boat surfaced off the coast of Iceland on 6 June, she came under attack from a British B-17 Flying Fortress squadron, which wounded seven men. 16 days later, (with assistance from other boats due to the damage caused by the attack), she arrived at Brest in France. The patrol lasted 27 days, the longest of her career.

On 17 October 1943, U-450 left Brest for Toulon. She arrived at the port city 23 days later.

On 10 February 1944, ten days after a fire in her engine room had swept one man overboard and forced her to return to base, U-450 left Toulon for the Italian coast, presumably to attack support ships coming to reinforce Allied troops which had just landed at Anzio.

=== Fate ===
On 10 March 1944, exactly one month later, she came under depth charge attack by the British escort destroyers HMS Blankney, HMS Blencathra, HMS Brecon and HMS Exmoor and the American escort destroyer USS Madison. The submarine sank, at position 41°11′N 12°27′E, but all 51 crew members were rescued by the destroyers and became prisoners of war.

== See also ==
- Mediterranean U-boat Campaign (World War II)

== Bibliography ==
- Busch, Rainer; Röll, Hans-Joachim (1999). German U-boat commanders of World War II : a biographical dictionary. Translated by Brooks, Geoffrey. London, Annapolis, Md: Greenhill Books, Naval Institute Press. ISBN 1-55750-186-6.
- Busch, Rainer; Röll, Hans-Joachim (1999). Deutsche U-Boot-Verluste von September 1939 bis Mai 1945 [German U-boat losses from September 1939 to May 1945]. Der U-Boot-Krieg (in German). Vol. IV. Hamburg, Berlin, Bonn: Mittler. ISBN 3-8132-0514-2.
- Gröner, Erich; Jung, Dieter; Maass, Martin (1991). U-boats and Mine Warfare Vessels. German Warships 1815–1945. Vol. 2. Translated by Thomas, Keith; Magowan, Rachel. London: Conway Maritime Press. ISBN 0-85177-593-4.
