= German submarine U-483 =

German World War II submarine

History

Nazi Germany
- Name: U-483
- Ordered: 5 June 1941
- Builder: Deutsche Werke, Kiel
- Yard number: 318
- Laid down: 20 March 1943
- Launched: 30 October 1943
- Commissioned: 22 December 1943
- Fate: Surrendered on 9 May 1945; sunk as part of Operation Deadlight on 16 December 1945

General characteristics
- Class & type: Type VIIC submarine
- Displacement: 769 tonnes (757 long tons) surfaced; 871 t (857 long tons) submerged
- Length: 67.23 m (220 ft 7 in) o/a; 50.50 m (165 ft 8 in) pressure hull
- Beam: 6.20 m (20 ft 4 in) o/a; 4.70 m (15 ft 5 in) pressure hull
- Height: 9.60 m (31 ft 6 in)
- Draught: 4.74 m (15 ft 7 in)
- Installed power: 2,800–3,200 PS (2,100–2,400 kW; 2,800–3,200 bhp) (diesels); 750 PS (550 kW; 740 shp) (electric)
- Propulsion: 2 shafts; 2 × diesel engines; 2 × electric motors.
- Speed: 17.7 knots (32.8 km/h; 20.4 mph) surfaced; 7.6 knots (14.1 km/h; 8.7 mph) submerged
- Range: 8,500 nmi (15,700 km; 9,800 mi) at 10 knots (19 km/h; 12 mph) surfaced; 80 nmi (150 km; 92 mi) at 4 knots (7.4 km/h; 4.6 mph) submerged
- Test depth: 230 m (750 ft); Crush depth: 250–295 m (820–968 ft)
- Complement: 4 officers, 40–56 enlisted
- Armament: 5 × 53.3 cm (21 in) torpedo tubes (four bow, one stern); 14 × torpedoes or 26 TMA mines; 1 × 3.7 cm (1.5 in) Flak M42 AA gun; 2 × twin 2 cm (0.79 in) C/30 anti-aircraft guns

Service record
- Part of: 5th U-boat Flotilla; 22 December 1943 – 31 July 1944; 3rd U-boat Flotilla; 1 August – 4 September 1944; 11th U-boat Flotilla; 5 September 1944 – 8 May 1945
- Identification codes: M 13 974
- Commanders: Kptlt. Hans-Joachim von Morstein; 22 December 1943 – 9 May 1945
- Operations: 2 patrols: 1st patrol: 3 October – 21 November 1944; 2nd patrol: 7 February – 26 March 1945
- Victories: 1 warship total loss (1,300 tons)

German submarine U-483 was a Type VIIC U-boat of Nazi Germany's Kriegsmarine during World War II.

She carried out two patrols. She caused one warship to be declared a total loss.

She surrendered on 9 May 1945; she was sunk as part of Operation Deadlight on 16 December 1945.

== Design ==
German Type VIIC submarines were preceded by the shorter Type VIIB submarines. U-483 had a displacement of 769 tonnes (757 long tons) when at the surface and 871 tonnes (857 long tons) while submerged. She had a total length of 67.10 m (220 ft 2 in), a pressure hull length of 50.50 m (165 ft 8 in), a beam of 6.20 m (20 ft 4 in), a height of 9.60 m (31 ft 6 in), and a draught of 4.74 m (15 ft 7 in). The submarine was powered by two Germaniawerft F46 four-stroke, six-cylinder supercharged diesel engines producing a total of 2,800 to 3,200 metric horsepower (2,060 to 2,350 kW; 2,760 to 3,160 shp) for use while surfaced, two Siemens-Schuckert GU 343/38–8 double-acting electric motors producing a total of 750 metric horsepower (550 kW; 740 shp) for use while submerged. She had two shafts and two 1.23 m (4 ft) propellers. The boat was capable of operating at depths of up to 230 metres (750 ft).

The submarine had a maximum surface speed of 17.7 knots (32.8 km/h; 20.4 mph) and a maximum submerged speed of 7.6 knots (14.1 km/h; 8.7 mph). When submerged, the boat could operate for 80 nautical miles (150 km; 92 mi) at 4 knots (7.4 km/h; 4.6 mph); when surfaced, she could travel 8,500 nautical miles (15,700 km; 9,800 mi) at 10 knots (19 km/h; 12 mph). U-483 was fitted with five 53.3 cm (21 in) torpedo tubes (four fitted at the bow and one at the stern), fourteen torpedoes, one 3.7 cm (1.5 in) Flak M42 and two twin 2 cm (0.79 in) C/30 anti-aircraft guns. The boat had a complement of between forty-four and sixty.

== Service history ==
The submarine was laid down on 20 March 1943 at Deutsche Werke in Kiel as yard number 318, launched on 30 October and commissioned on 22 December under the command of Kapitänleutnant Hans-Joachim von Morstein.

She served with the 5th U-boat Flotilla from 22 December 1943 for training and the 3rd flotilla from 1 August 1944 for operations. She was reassigned to the 11th flotilla on 5 September.

=== First patrol ===
U-432's first patrol was preceded by short journeys from Kiel in Germany to Horten Naval Base (south of Oslo) and then Stavanger, both in Norway. The patrol itself began when the boat departed Stavanger on 3 October 1944. A Schnorchel [an underwater engine-functioning and breathing device], failure northwest of Scotland on the 12th resulted in the death of one man.

On 1 November 1944 she torpedoed the British frigate HMS Whitaker off Malin Head, Ireland. The bows were blown off the US-built ship. The commander, all the other officers and 84 ratings died, but the ship did not sink. The fires were put out and the flooding was stopped. She was eventually towed to Londonderry Port, then Belfast, but she was declared a total loss.

=== Second patrol ===
By now based at Bergen, the boat left there for her second foray on 7 February 1945. According to one source, she managed to enter the Irish Sea. She docked at Trondheim on 26 March.

== Fate ==
U-483 surrendered in Trondheim on 9 May 1945. She was transferred to Scapa Flow then Loch Ryan in Scotland on 29 May for Operation Deadlight. She was sunk on 16 December by causes unknown.

== Summary of raiding history ==
Date	Ship Name	Nationality	Tonnage (Note: Merchant ship tonnages are in gross register tons. Military vessels are listed by tons displacement.)	Fate
1 November 1944	HMS Whitaker	Royal Navy	1,300	Total loss

== Bibliography ==
- Busch, Rainer; Röll, Hans-Joachim (1999). German U-boat commanders of World War II : a biographical dictionary. Translated by Brooks, Geoffrey. London, Annapolis, Md: Greenhill Books, Naval Institute Press. ISBN 1-55750-186-6.
- Busch, Rainer; Röll, Hans-Joachim (1999). Deutsche U-Boot-Verluste von September 1939 bis Mai 1945 [German U-boat losses from September 1939 to May 1945]. Der U-Boot-Krieg (in German). Vol. IV. Hamburg, Berlin, Bonn: Mittler. ISBN 3-8132-0514-2.
- Gröner, Erich; Jung, Dieter; Maass, Martin (1991). U-boats and Mine Warfare Vessels. German Warships 1815–1945. Vol. 2. Translated by Thomas, Keith; Magowan, Rachel. London: Conway Maritime Press. ISBN 0-85177-593-4.
