= William Jumper =

Royal Naval captain (c. 1660–1715)

Captain Sir William Jumper
- Born: c. 1660; Weybridge, Surrey
- Died: 4 March 1715 (aged 54–55); Plymouth
- Burial place: St Andrew's Church, Plymouth
- Military career
- Allegiance: Kingdom of Great Britain
- Branch: Royal Navy
- Rank: Captain
- Commands: HMS Hopewell; HMS Cygnet; HMS Saudadoes; HMS Adventure; HMS Weymouth; HMS Swiftsure; HMS Lenox
- Conflicts: Nine Years' War; Battle of Barfleur; War of the Spanish Succession; Battle of Cádiz; Capture of Gibraltar; Battle of Málaga

Sir William Jumper (c. 1660 – 12 March 1715) was an officer of the Royal Navy. He rose to the rank of captain after service in the Nine Years' War and the War of the Spanish Succession. He is known for being one of the first to step onto land during the Capture of Gibraltar in 1704. Jumper's Bastion in Gibraltar was named after him.

== Life ==
Jumper was said for many years to have been born in Bandon, County Cork. His date of birth is unknown, but he was baptised on 8 January 1660 as the second son of William and Elizabeth Jumper of Weybridge in Surrey. Jumper spent ten years working for the Royal African Company off the coast of Africa, as an apprentice to John Love, one of their captains. In 1688 he was appointed to master's mate on HMS Resolution by George Legge, Baron Dartmouth. The following year Jumper obtained a commission as a first lieutenant and is thought to have travelled to the Mediterranean with Vice-Admiral Henry Killigrew. In 1690 he married Elizabeth Willis, and Killigrew moved him to HMS Duke and the following year he earned his commission as a lieutenant of Killigrew's marines.

The Battle of Barfleur took place on 19 May 1692 and Jumper was there as the captain of the fireship HMS Hopewell as part of an Anglo-Dutch fleet under the command of Edward Russell, 1st Earl of Orford. The Hopewell was expended in an attempt to set light to the French ships, and later volunteered with a boat part that succeeded in firing the French ships. Jumper quickly moved through the command of several fire ships, joining HMS Cygnet in June 1692, HMS Saudadoes in October 1692 and then the 44-gun HMS Adventure in July 1693, before he was given the command of the new ship HMS Weymouth in March 1694. From 30 October 1698 he was flag captain to Sir Cloudesley Shovell aboard the 66-gun HMS Swiftsure. He was with Swiftsure until 13 July 1699, and returned on 13 September and commanded her until January 1700.

Jumper was appointed captain of the newly commissioned third rate ship of the line HMS Lenox in 1701.

Jumper was part of Sir George Rooke's fleet at the attack on Cadiz in 1702. In 1704 he was one of the first captains to set foot on land during the successful capture of Gibraltar. He and Captain Wilkes led troops whilst Edward Whitaker tried to obtain permission for a landing. Jumper was mentioned particularly by Whitaker and he was later honoured by having Jumper's Bastion in Gibraltar named after him. Jumper took part in the Battle of Málaga on 13 August 1704, sustaining injuries to his back and shoulders during the battle. Jumper was knighted in 1704. Also at this time, he owned a manor house in Yelsted, Kent. After he died, his son William Jumper, esquire owned the house.

Jumper went out to the Mediterranean again in 1707, and narrowly avoided the fate of Sir Cloudesley Shovel and almost 2,000 of his men on their return home, when a substantial part of the fleet was shipwrecked on the Scilly Isles. Jumper arrived safely in Falmouth on 22 October 1707. He petitioned for a posting at home after this, and was appointed commissioner at Chatham Dockyard. In 1714 Jumper became resident Navy Commissioner at Plymouth and died on 12 March 1715. He was buried three days later at St Andrew's Church, Plymouth.
