= Jumper's Bastion =

Coordinates: 36°7′0″N 5°21′0″W

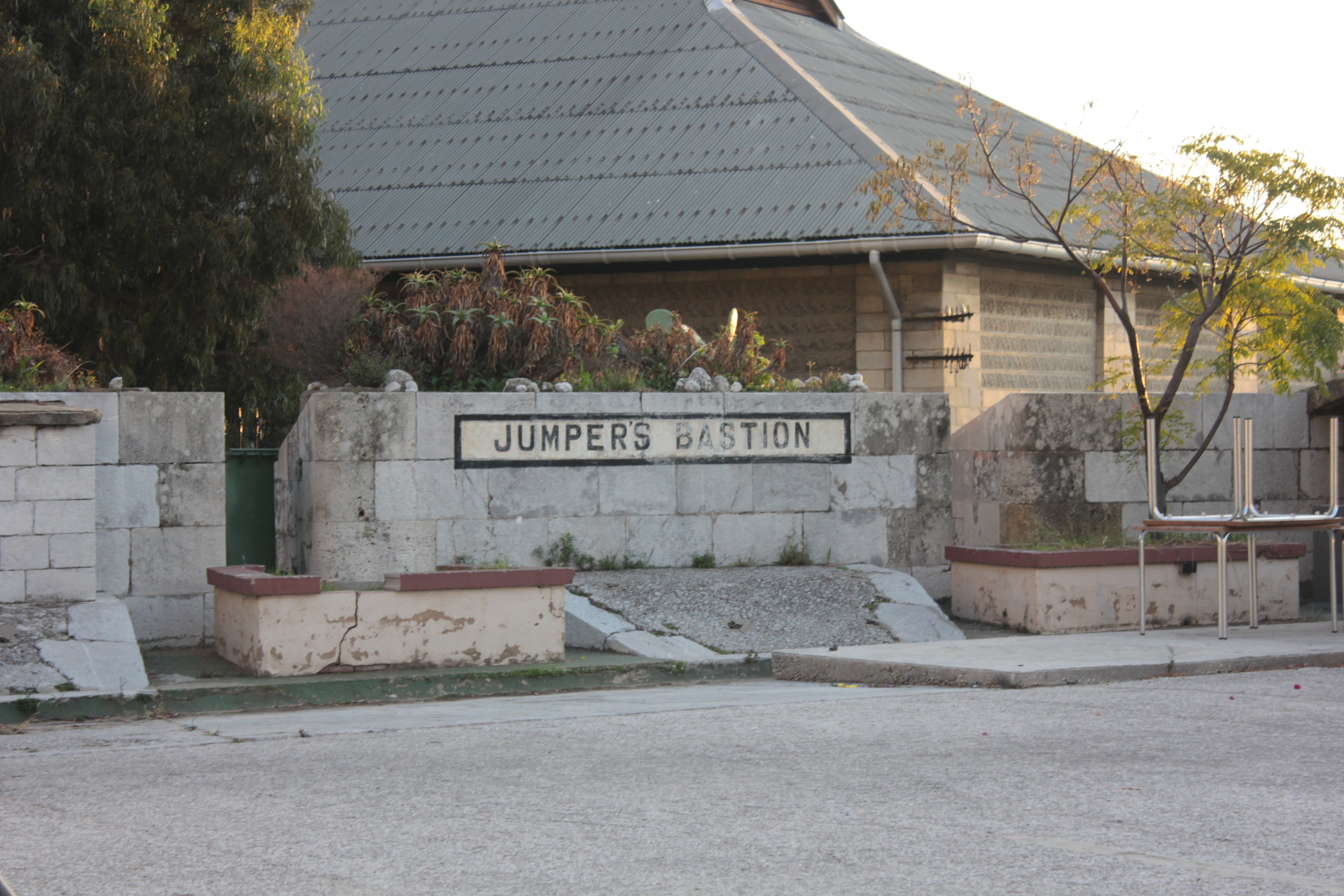
Jumper's Bastion

Jumper's Bastion may refer to one of two adjacent bastions in the British Overseas Territory of Gibraltar. They were both created in 1785 on the sites of previous constructions and named for a British captain who was one on the first on shore during the capture of Gibraltar in 1704.

== History ==
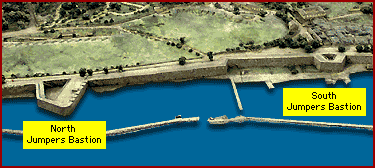
The two Jumpers Bastions shown on a nineteenth century model now in Gibraltar Museum

The bastions (north and south) are located along the Line Wall Curtain on the West Side of Gibraltar. They take their name from a Captain William Jumper who was one of the first officers to land ashore and capture the existing Spanish bastion on this site during the Capture of Gibraltar in August 1704. According to George Hills, the first two captains to come ashore were called Juniper (sic) and Hicks. They were sent by Captain Edward Whitaker when he saw that the Spanish guns covering the New Mole had been put out of action.

=== North Jumper's Bastion ===
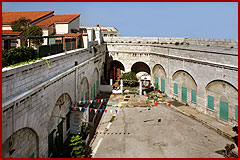
The northern bastion

The Spanish called the northern bastion Santa Cruz Bastion; it was designed by the Florentine military architect Giovan Giacomo Paleari Fratino in 1575. After being captured by the British in 1704 and renamed the Eight Gun Battery, it was rebuilt in 1785.

In 1841, General Sir John Thomas Jones produced a report on Gibraltar's fortifications in which he proposed enlarging North Jumper's Bastion to its current proportions. It was rebuilt between 1844–7 into a demi-bastion with two flanks and one face. The long south flank has embrasures for six guns, underneath which are six casemated bombproof barracks, each with room for 32 men. Several ancillary rooms are also provided on the north and south flanks. Musketry embrasures were provided along the face and north flank. For a while, it was envisaged that the bastion would be replaced with a 24-gun flat bastion incorporating casemated barracks, along with a realignment of the curtain wall, but this was never realised.

=== South Jumper's Bastion ===
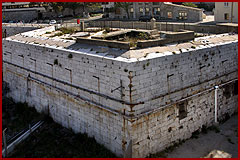
the southern bastion

The southern bastion was also rebuilt in 1785 on the site of an old sea gate. It has a flat face that runs parallel to the curtain wall and is more akin to a platform than a bastion, as it was designed to be defended through musket fire only. Accommodation is more modest than the northern bastion but it is on two levels and on two sides only.

In December 2017, the Government of Gibraltar announced that South Jumper's Bastion would form the basis of a new studio complex for the Gibraltar Broadcasting Corporation, which broadcasts GBC TV and Radio Gibraltar.
