= HMS Ekins =

Frigate of the Royal Navy

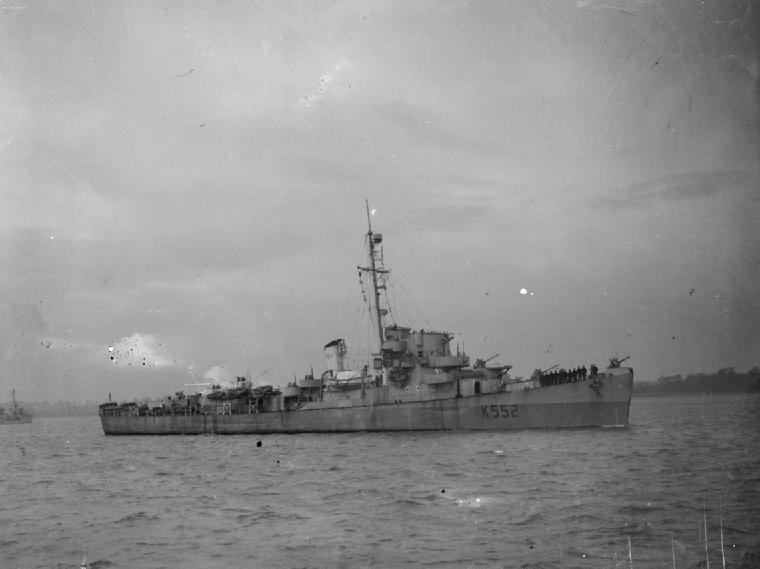
- HMS Ekins off Harwich, England, on 12 November 1944

History

United States
- Name: Unnamed (DE-87)
- Builder: Bethlehem-Hingham Shipyard, Hingham, Massachusetts
- Laid down: 5 July 1943
- Launched: 2 October 1943
- Completed: 29 November 1943
- Fate: Transferred to United Kingdom 29 November 1943
- Stricken: 25 June 1945
- Fate: Nominally returned by United Kingdom June 1945; Sold March 1947 for scrapping

United Kingdom
- Name: HMS Ekins (K552)
- Namesake: Captain Sir Charles Ekins (1768-1855), British naval officer who was commanding officer of HMS Superb at the bombardment of Algiers in 1816
- Acquired: 29 November 1943
- Commissioned: 29 November 1943
- Decommissioned: 1945
- Identification: Pennant number K552
- Fate: Constructive total loss after 16 April 1945; Nominally returned to United States June 1945

General characteristics
- Displacement: 1,400 long tons (1,422 t)
- Length: 306 ft (93 m)
- Beam: 36.75 ft (11.2 m)
- Draught: 9 ft (2.7 m)
- Propulsion: Two Foster-Wheeler Express "D"-type water-tube boilers; GE 13,500 shp (10,070 kW) steam turbines and generators (9,200 kW); Electric motors for 12,000 shp (8,900 kW); Two shafts
- Speed: 24 knots (44 km/h)
- Range: 5,500 nautical miles (10,200 km) at 15 knots (28 km/h)
- Complement: 186
- Sensors & processing systems: SA & SL type radars; Type 144 series Asdic; MF Direction Finding antenna; HF Direction Finding Type FH 4 antenna
- Armament: 3 × 3 in (76 mm) /50 Mk.22 guns; 1 × twin Bofors 40 mm mount Mk.I; 7–16 × 20 mm Oerlikon guns; Mark 10 Hedgehog antisubmarine mortar; Depth charges; QF 2-pounder naval gun

HMS Ekins (K552) was a British Captain-class frigate of the Royal Navy that served during World War II. Originally constructed as a United States Navy Buckley class destroyer escort, she served in the Royal Navy from 1943 to 1945.

== Construction and transfer ==
The ship was laid down as a U.S. Navy destroyer escort designated "DE-87" by Bethlehem-Hingham Shipyard, Inc., in Hingham, Massachusetts, on 5 July 1943 and launched on 2 October 1943. She was transferred to the United Kingdom upon completion on 29 November 1943.

== Service history ==
Commissioned into service in the Royal Navy as the frigate HMS Ekins (K552) on 29 November 1943 simultaneously with her transfer, the ship served on patrol and escort duty.

After workup at Casco Bay, Maine and Bermuda, Ekins crossed the Atlantic. She was then underwent modification at Belfast for North Atlantic convoy duty, with additional depth charge racks and life rafts being fitted before joining the 3rd Escort Group, operating in the North Atlantic. Ekins joined the 21st Destroyer Flotilla, based at Sheerness in time for the Invasion of Normandy in June 1944, forming part of the escort of a convoy from the River Thames to the invasion beaches on 6 June, and continuing to escort convoys to Normandy until September. On 21 July 1944 she joined the British frigate Curzon in sinking with depth charges and Hedgehog the German submarine U-212 in the English Channel south of Brighton, England, at 50°27′00″N 000°13′00″W.

In September 1944, Ekins was transferred to the 16th Destroyer Flotilla based at Harwich, where she served as a Coastal Forces Control Frigate, in order to prevent attacks by German E-boats against convoys. She normally operated in conjunction with Royal Navy Motor Torpedo boats, and other warships, using her radar to direct operations against German coastal forces. To assist in this role, she was fitted with additional communications equipment and the "Headache" COMINT equipment to intercept German radio transmissions. She was also fitted with a 2-pounder (40 mm) gun as a bow chaser, mounted in the bow of the ship for close-in engagements against E-boats.

On the night of 24/25 December 1944, Ekins, in conjunction with sister ship Thornborough, the frigate Caicos and the corvette Shearwater, disrupted an attempt by German E-boats of the 8th Schnellboot Flotilla to operate against the convoy route to Antwerp, while on 1 January 1945, Ekins sank a German Seehund midget submarine off Ostend. On 11/12 April 1945 Ekins sank two German Linsen explosive motor boats. On the night of 12/13 April Ekins and the Hunt-class destroyer Hambledon encountered a force of 12 German E-boats laying mines in the approaches to the Scheldt estuary. Two E-boats were damaged.

On 16 April 1945, Ekins set off two ground mines in the North Sea 13 nautical miles (24 km) northwest of Ostend, Belgium. The first mine caused flooding of the engine rooms and a loss of power while the second explosion holed the ship in her Asdic compartment. Although severely damaged, she managed to limp back to port. Damaged beyond economical repair, she was declared a constructive total loss and was decommissioned later in 1945.

== Disposal ==
The Royal Navy nominally returned Ekins to the U.S. Navy in June 1945. The U.S. Navy struck her from its Naval Vessel Register on 25 June 1945. She was sold in March 1947 for scrapping in the Netherlands, and she was scrapped at Dordrecht later that year.
