= Edward Whitaker =

Admiral Sir Edward Whitaker
- Born: 1660
- Died: 20 November 1735 (aged 74–75); Carshalton, Surrey
- Burial place: Carshalton, Surrey
- Military career
- Allegiance: Kingdom of Great Britain
- Branch: Royal Navy
- Service years: – 1735
- Rank: Admiral
- Commands: HMS Dover; HMS Royal Sovereign; HMS Elizabeth; HMS Monck; HMS St Andrew; HMS Victory; HMS Portland; HMS Ranelagh; HMS Restoration; HMS Dorsetshire
- Conflicts: War of the Spanish Succession; Capture of Gibraltar; Battle of Málaga; Capture of Minorca

Sir Edward Whitaker (1660 – 20 November 1735) was an officer of the Royal Navy. He served during the War of the Spanish Succession and is known for his role in the Capture of Gibraltar and the Battle of Málaga in 1704.

== Life ==
Edward Whitaker was born in 1660. He joined the Royal Navy and he was promoted to a lieutenant of HMS Swallow on 16 October 1688 under Matthew Aylmer. The following year the two of them had moved to HMS Royal Katherine and on 15 May 1690 Whitaker became captain of his first command, the 44-gun HMS Dover. For three years he and his crew captured many French privateers and supporting prize money. On 27 September 1692 he married Ann Stephens of Leigh on Essex.

In 1693 he returned to support Aylmer who was now an admiral and he was his flag-captain in HMS Royal Sovereign. 1695 to 1696 he had a confusing command looking after HMS Elizabeth, HMS Monck and HMS St Andrew with the honour of also being Sir Cloudesley Shovell's flag-captain in HMS Victory.

In 1698 he was not at sea but living in Leigh-on-Sea in Essex, but by May of the following year he had a new command in HMS Portland. On 13 January 1702 fifty ships were commissioned on one day and Whitaker briefly was given HMS Ranelagh before he became master-attendant at Woolwich. At the start of 1702 he very briefly commanded HMS Restoration before he took up the command that was to make his name. Whitaker commanded HMS Dorsetshire as part of the fleet under George Rooke in 1704.

== Capture of Gibraltar ==
During the 1704 Capture of Gibraltar Whitaker was Sir George Byng's aide-de-camp. 'his ship not being upon service,’ Whitaker commanded a successful attack on Gibraltar and it was Whitaker who regained command when the successful attackers were confused into a retreat when a Spanish magazine exploded. Two of his captains had led this attack whilst Whitaker was trying to get authority for the attack from Byng. William Jumper was mentioned particularly by Whitaker and a he was later honoured by having Jumper's Bastion named after him. Amongst the attacking group was HMS Nottingham which was commanded by Whitaker's brother Samuel.

== Later actions ==
In the Battle of Málaga on 24 August 1704 Whitaker was still in command of the Dorsetshire and was at the centre of the action. In 1705 Whitaker commanded HMS Barfleur and in the first few months of 1706 he became Sir Edward Whitaker, rear-admiral of the blue, commanding a squadron of ships in the English Channel escorting the Duke of Marlborough to Holland in April.

In 1708, with his Admiral's flag in HMS Northumberland, he went to join Sir John Leake in the Mediterranean where he assisted at the capture of Minorca, taking Fort Fornelle (for local, see Fornells, Menorca) and Fort Ciudadella (for local, see Ciutadella de Menorca). Whitaker became a vice-admiral of the blue after he took over Leake's command. On 14 November 1709 he was made vice-admiral of the white. In January 1708 Sir George Byng took over as commander in chief in the Mediterranean with Whitaker as second in command, until Byng went back to England in 1709. Whitaker returned in 1710 and married again, as his first wife had died in 1705. He went on to take a significant role in the occupation of Dunkirk in 1712. He retired, and in 1713 moved from Number 25 Soho Square to Number 36. Whitaker died on 20 November 1735 at Carshalton in Surrey, where he was buried.

== Legacy ==
The Royal Navy named two ships HMS Whitaker. The first was a destroyer ordered towards the end of the First World War but later cancelled; the second was a frigate in service during the Second World War.
