= Yelsted =

Hamlet in Kent, England

Coordinates: 51.331968°N 0.618138°E

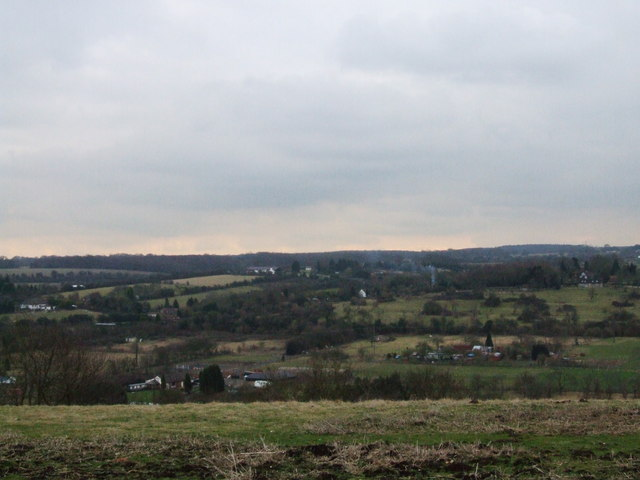
- View over Yelsted

- Location within Kent
- District: Maidstone
- Shire county: Kent
- Region: South East
- Country: England
- Sovereign state: United Kingdom
- Post town: SITTINGBOURNE
- Postcode district: ME9
- Police: Kent
- Fire: Kent
- Ambulance: South East Coast
- UK Parliament: Faversham and Mid Kent

Yelsted is a hamlet in the Borough of Maidstone, in the county of Kent, England.

In 1800, Edward Hasted noted that it was spelt Gillested. It was a manor in the parish of Stockbury, the manor-house was owned by 'John de Savage', (grandson of 'Ralph de Savage', who was with King Richard I at the siege of Acon, France). Later, the house was passed to Sir William Jumper (commissioner of his Majesty's navy at Plymouth). His son, William Jumper, (esquire) and his wife Jane. After William died, the wife sold it in 1757, to the Rev. Pierce Dixon, master of the mathematicalfree school at Rochester. By 1800, another family relative of the 'Jumper's owned the house now called 'Hill Green House'.

In 1870–72, John Marius Wilson's Imperial Gazetteer of England and Wales described Yelsted like this: "YELSTED, a village in Stockbury parish, Kent; 7½ miles NE of Maidstone."
