= HMS Brecon (L76) =

Destroyer of the Royal Navy

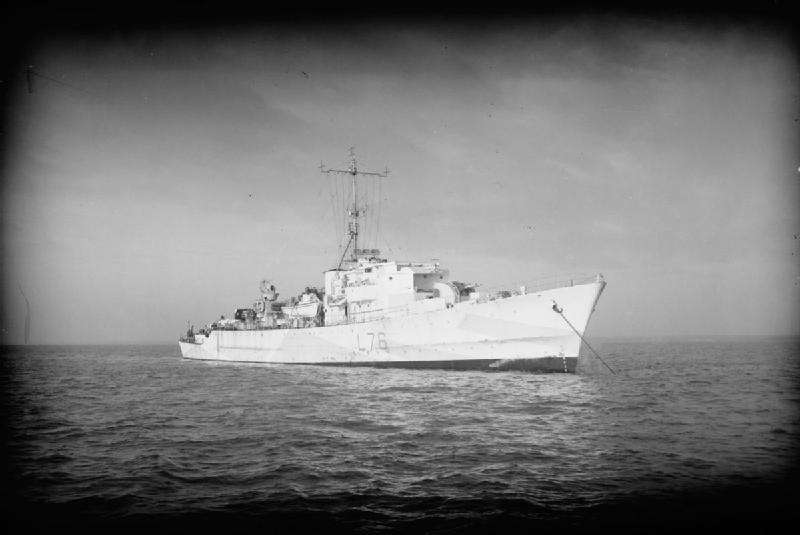
- HMS Brecon at anchor (IWM)

History

United Kingdom
- Name: HMS Brecon
- Ordered: 1940
- Builder: Thornycroft, Woolston
- Laid down: 27 February 1941
- Launched: 27 June 1942
- Commissioned: 18 December 1942
- Decommissioned: Paid off into reserve 12 December 1945
- Motto: By luck and good guidance
- Honours and awards: Atlantic 1943; Sicily 1943; Salerno 1943; South France 1943; Mediterranean 1944; Aegean 1944; English Channel 1945
- Fate: Sold for scrapping to BISCO August 1961. Broken Up 1962 by Shipbreaking Industries, Faslane
- Badge: On a Field Barry wavy of four Blue and White, a trumpet, gold.

General characteristics
- Class & type: Type IV Hunt-class destroyer
- Displacement: 1,175 long tons (1,194 t) standard; 1,561 long tons (1,586 t) full load
- Length: 90.22 m (296 ft 0 in) o/a
- Beam: 9.6 m (31 ft 6 in)
- Draught: 2.36 m (7 ft 9 in)
- Propulsion: 2 Admiralty 3-drum boilers; 2 shaft Parsons geared turbines, 19,000 shp (14,000 kW)
- Speed: 26 knots (30 mph; 48 km/h); 25.5 kn (29.3 mph; 47.2 km/h) full
- Range: 950 nmi (1,760 km) at 25 kn (46 km/h)
- Complement: 170
- Armament: 6 × QF 4 in Mark XVI guns on twin mounts Mk. XIX; 4 × QF 2 pdr Mk. VIII on quad mount MK.VII; 2 × 20 mm Oerlikons on single mounts P Mk. III; 4 × 0.5 in Vickers machine guns on twin mounts Mk. V, later replaced by 4 × 20 mm Oerlikons on twin mounts Mk. V; 3 × 21 inch (533 mm) torpedo tubes; 40 depth charges, 2 throwers, 1 rack

HMS Brecon was a Hunt-class destroyer of the Royal Navy that saw service in World War II, one of two ships in the fourth subgroup of the class, built to a radically different design from other ships in the Hunt class.

== Construction and commissioning ==
Brecon was ordered under the 1940 War Emergency Programme from Thornycroft of Woolston. She was laid down as Job J6069 (Yard No 1290) on 27 February 1941 and launched on 27 June 1942 . She was commissioned into service on 18 December 1942 and was assigned to the 6th Destroyer Flotilla at Scapa Flow.

== Career ==
=== 1943 ===
Brecon arrived at the Home Fleet at Scapa Flow in January 1943 and after working up was engaged in convoy escort and Fleet duties in the North Western Approaches and North Sea. In June she was detached from Home Fleet to be made ready for service in Mediterranean to support Operation Husky, the planned allied landings in Sicily. She was one of the escorts for joint military Convoy WS31 to Gibraltar and continued with Convoy KMF17. In July she helped escort the assaulting forces in Convoy KMF18 to the beach head where she remained to provide convoy defence and interception patrols.

In August Brecon was transferred to Destroyer Division 58 and assigned to Task Force 85 for Operation Avalanche, the Allied landings at Salerno. In September she sailed from Bizerta as escort for assault Convoy FSS2 and on arrival provided gunfire support during the landing, followed by escort, support and patrols during which she had a minor collision with Laforey. For the remainder of the year she operated in the central and western Mediterranean.

=== 1944 ===
In January she provided support for Operation Shingle, the Allied landings at Anzio. She arrived at the beachhead on 23 January where she provided support and patrol duties which continued through February and March. With Blankney, Exmoor and Blencathra she took part in the sinking of the German submarine U-450. In April she was transferred to 18th Destroyer Flotilla for further convoy escort and patrol duties. In July Brecon started preparations under the command of the United States Navy for Operation Dragoon, the invasion of southern France. In August she escorted Convoy SM3 to the beachhead and then was returned to Royal Navy command for patrol and convoy defence in the eastern Mediterranean.

On 19 September with Terpsichore, Troubridge, Zetland and ORP Garland she took part in the sinking of U-407 south of Melos. On 28 September she bombarded German forces at Pegadio and Karpathos. In October, with the withdrawal of German troops from the Aegean Islands and Greek mainland, she joined the British Aegean Force to intercept German evacuation craft and provided gunfire support for landing Allied troops. In December she returned to Britain to prepare for service in East Indies.

=== 1945 ===
On arrival in the UK Brecon was instead assigned to the 21st Destroyer Flotilla based at Sheerness to combat snorkel fitted U-boats that were attacking convoys and minelaying in the South Western Approaches. In April she sailed to Malta to refit for service in the Eastern Fleet, before returning to the UK for leave. In June she joined the 18th Destroyer Flotilla at Colombo and started preparations for Operation Zipper, the planned British re-occupation of Malaya. During August she performed escort duties, before sailing to Singapore in September to attend the surrender of the Japanese occupying forces. Brecon returned to Portsmouth on 12 December 1945 to be paid-off and was placed into Reserve status.

=== Postwar and fate ===
Brecon remained in Reserve until 1956 when placed on the Disposal List. Her hulk was sold to BISCO for breaking in August 1961. She was towed to Faslane in September 1962 for demolition by Shipbreaking Industries Ltd.

== Publications ==
- Colledge, J. J.; Warlow, Ben (2006) [1969]. Ships of the Royal Navy: The Complete Record of All Fighting Ships of the Royal Navy from the 15th Century to the Present (3rd Rev ed.). London: Chatham Publishing. ISBN 978-1-86176-281-8. OCLC 67375475.
- English, John (1987). The Hunts: A history of the design, development and careers of the 86 destroyers of this class built for the Royal and Allied Navies during World War II. World Ship Society. ISBN 0-905617-44-4.
