= HMS Whitaker =

HMS Whitaker has been the name of more than one ship of the British Royal Navy, and may refer to:

- HMS Whitaker, a destroyer cancelled in 1918 prior to construction; see V and W-class destroyer#Admiralty modified W class
- HMS Whitaker (K580), a frigate in commission from 1944 to 1945
