= Capture of Menorca =

Capture of Menorca may refer to:

- Capture of Menorca (1708)
- Capture of Menorca (1798)
