= HMS Whitaker (K580) =

British Captain-class frigate of the Royal Navy

History

United States
- Name: unnamed (DE-571)
- Builder: Bethlehem-Hingham Shipyard, Hingham, Massachusetts
- Laid down: 20 October 1943
- Launched: 12 December 1943
- Completed: 28 January 1944
- Commissioned: never
- Fate: Transferred to United Kingdom 28 January 1944
- Stricken: 19 May 1945
- Acquired: Returned by United Kingdom 3 December 1945
- Fate: Sold 9 January 1947 for scrapping

United Kingdom
- Name: HMS Whitaker (K580)
- Namesake: Vice Admiral Sir Edward Whitaker (1660–1735), British naval officer who distinguished himself as commanding officer of HMS Dorsetshire in 1704
- Acquired: 28 January 1944
- Commissioned: 28 January 1944
- Decommissioned: March 1945
- Fate: Constructive total loss 1 November 1944; Returned to United States 3 December 1945

General characteristics
- Displacement: 1,400 long tons (1,422 t)
- Length: 306 ft (93 m)
- Beam: 36.75 ft (11.2 m)
- Draught: 9 ft (2.7 m)
- Propulsion: Two Foster-Wheeler Express "D"-type water-tube boilers; GE 13,500 shp (10,070 kW) steam turbines and generators (9,200 kW); Electric motors for 12,000 shp (8,900 kW); Two shafts
- Speed: 24 knots (44 km/h)
- Range: 5,500 nautical miles (10,200 km) at 15 knots (28 km/h)
- Complement: 186
- Sensors & processing systems: SA & SL type radars; Type 144 series Asdic; MF Direction Finding antenna; HF Direction Finding Type FH 4 antenna
- Armament: 3 × 3 in (76 mm) /50 Mk.22 guns; 1 × twin Bofors 40 mm mount Mk.I; 7–16 × 20 mm Oerlikon guns; Mark 10 Hedgehog antisubmarine mortar; Depth charges; QF 2-pounder naval gun
- Notes: Pennant number K580

The second HMS Whitaker (K580), and the first to enter service, was a British Captain-class frigate of the Royal Navy in commission during World War II. Originally constructed as a United States Navy Buckley class destroyer escort, she served in the Royal Navy from 1944 to 1945.

== Construction and transfer ==
The ship was laid down as the unnamed U.S. Navy destroyer escort DE-571 by Bethlehem-Hingham Shipyard, Inc., in Hingham, Massachusetts, on 20 October 1943 and launched on 12 December 1943. She was transferred to the United Kingdom upon completion on 28 January 1944.

== Service history ==
The ship was commissioned into service in the Royal Navy as the frigate HMS Whitaker (K580) on 28 January 1944 simultaneously with her transfer. She served on patrol and escort duty and operated in support of the invasion of Normandy in the summer of 1944.

The German submarine U-483 torpedoed Whitaker at 0210 hours on 1 November 1944, off Malin Head on the north coast of Ireland at position 55°30′00″N 007°39′00″W. Damage control measures brought the resultant fires under control by 0320 hours but not before the ship had lost much of her bow and suffered 79 dead. Towed first to Londonderry Port, Northern Ireland, and then to Belfast, Northern Ireland, Whitaker was declared a constructive total loss, remained inactive for the rest of World War II, and was decommissioned in March 1945. The U.S. Navy struck her from its Naval Vessel Register on 19 May 1945.

The Royal Navy returned Whitaker to the U.S. Navy on 3 December 1945.

== Disposal ==
After her return to the U.S. Navy, Whitaker remained in the United Kingdom for ultimate disposition. She was sold to John Lee of Belfast on 9 January 1947 for scrapping.
