= HMS Dorsetshire (1694) =

Ship of the line of the Royal Navy

History

Great Britain
- Name: HMS Dorsetshire
- Builder: Winter, Southampton
- Launched: 8 December 1694
- Fate: Sold, 1749

General characteristics as built
- Class & type: 80-gun third rate ship of the line
- Tons burthen: 1,176
- Length: 153 ft 4.5 in (46.7 m) (gundeck)
- Beam: 42 ft (12.8 m)
- Depth of hold: 18 ft (5.5 m)
- Propulsion: Sails
- Sail plan: Full-rigged ship
- Armament: 80 guns of various weights of shot

General characteristics after 1712 rebuild
- Class & type: 1706 Establishment 80-gun third rate ship of the line
- Tons burthen: 1,289
- Length: 156 ft (47.5 m) (gundeck)
- Beam: 43 ft 6 in (13.3 m)
- Depth of hold: 17 ft 8 in (5.4 m)
- Propulsion: Sails
- Sail plan: Full-rigged ship
- Armament: 80 guns: Gundeck: 26 × 32 pdrs; Middle gundeck: 26 × 12 pdrs; Upper gundeck: 24 × 6 pdrs; Quarterdeck: 4 × 6 pdrs

HMS Dorsetshire, the first Royal Navy ship to be named after the county of Dorset, was an 80-gun third rate ship of the line of the Royal Navy, launched at Southampton on 8 December 1694.

Dorsetshire came under the command of Edward Whitaker in 1704, and was at the capture of Gibraltar (but out of commission). The ship later participated in the Battle of Málaga the same year.

She was rebuilt according to the 1706 Establishment at Portsmouth Dockyard, and relaunched on 20 September 1712. As built, Dorsetshire had carried her 80-gun armament on two decks, but during this rebuild they were redistributed over a third gundeck, although she continued to be classified as a third rate.

Dorsetshire continued to serve until 1749, when she was sold out of the navy.
