= HMS Woolston =

Destroyer of the Royal Navy

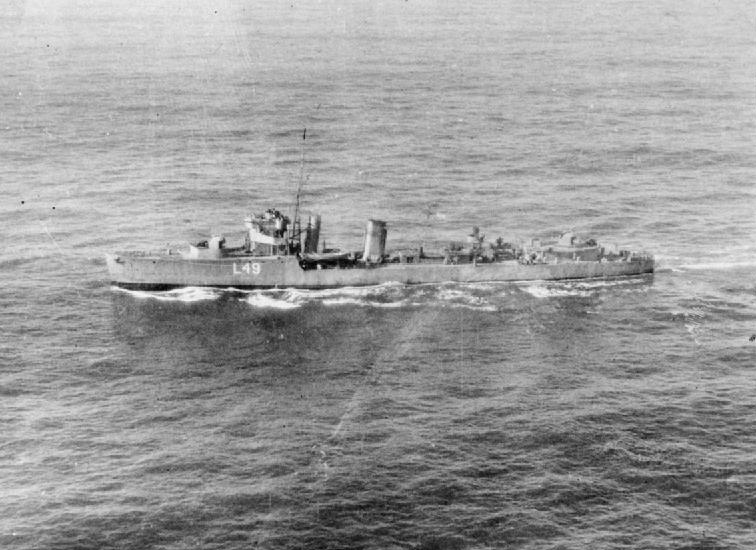
- HMS Woolston underway in April 1940 after her conversion to a long range convoy escort

History

United Kingdom
- Name: HMS Woolston
- Builder: John I. Thornycroft & Company
- Laid down: 25 April 1917
- Launched: 27 January 1918
- Commissioned: 28 June 1918
- Decommissioned: August 1945
- Motto: Quo majores ducunt: 'Where our forefathers lead we follow'
- Honours and awards: Atlantic 1941; Arctic 1942; North Sea 1941–43; Sicily 1943
- Fate: Sold for scrapping on 18 February 1947
- Badge: On a Field Black, a Roman galley, Silver.

General characteristics
- Class & type: W-class destroyer
- Displacement: 1,120 tons standard
- Length: 300 ft (91 m) o/a, 312 ft (95 m) p/p
- Beam: 30 ft 6 in (9.30 m)
- Draught: 10 ft 6 in (3.20 m)
- Propulsion: 3 Yarrow type Water-tube boilers, Brown-Curtis steam turbines, 2 shafts, 30,000 shp
- Speed: 36-knot (67 km/h)
- Range: 320-370 tons oil, 3,500 nmi (6,500 km) at 15 knots (28 km/h), 900 nmi (1,700 km) at 32 knots (59 km/h)
- Complement: 134
- Armament: 4 × QF 4 in Mk V (102mm L/45), mount P Mk.I; 1 × QF 3-inch 20 cwt Mk.I (76 mm), mount HA Mk.II; 6 (3x2) tubes for 21 in torpedoes

HMS Woolston was a W-class destroyer of the Royal Navy. She served through two world wars, surviving both of them.

== Construction, commissioning and early career ==
Woolston was ordered under the 10th Order of the 1916 – 17 Programme from the Woolston yards of John I. Thornycroft & Company. She was laid down on 25 April 1917, launched on 27 January 1918 and commissioned on 28 June 1918. She went on to serve briefly with the Atlantic Fleet during the First World War. She became part of the 4th Destroyer Flotilla in 1921 and transferred with the Flotilla to serve in the Mediterranean. She, along with a number of her sisters, were then reduced to the reserve. She was reactivated in 1938 having been selected for conversion into an anti-aircraft escort (or WAIR) at Chatham Dockyard.

== Wartime career ==
Woolston was still under refit at Chatham on the outbreak of the Second World War. Around this time her pennant number was changed to L49, to match those used by escort destroyers. She spent October on post refit trials and then commissioned for service, joining the Nore Command in November to commence convoy defence duties in the English Channel and the North Sea. She continued these duties for the rest of 1939 and all of 1940. She was detached for a period in 1941 to cover Atlantic convoys as they passed through the Western Approaches. In February 1942 Woolston was reassigned to the Home Fleet and sailed to Scapa Flow. After a successful 'Warship Week' in March 1942 she was adopted by Congleton, Cheshire. In March she was one of a number of destroyers screening heavy fleet units covering the passage of the Arctic convoys PQ 12 and the returning PQ 8. Woolston then returned to the Nore Command and spent the rest of the year deploying in the North Sea. Woolston was part of the fleet that put to see in July 1942 in an attempt intercept the German battleship Tirpitz.

She continued in these duties until May 1943, when she was assigned to cover military convoys passing through the Atlantic carrying troops and supplies for the allied invasion of Sicily. She sailed to the Clyde on 20 June and joined the outbound military convoy WS-31 on passage to Gibraltar. She and the other escorts were detached from the convoy on its arrival in Gibraltar on 26 June. Woolston then took passage to Bône in early July and was nominated to join the Eastern Support force in Escort Group V. She left Bône on 7 July as part of the military convoy KMF18 on passage to the beach head, and was detached on 9 July to refuel in Malta. She returned the next day to join the Escort Group in providing anti-aircraft defence of the anchorages off the beach head. On the successful completion of the landings Woolston returned to the Nore Command and spent the rest of 1943 on convoy defence duty in the North Sea. She remained at this task for the rest of the war.

== Postwar ==
Immediately after the end of the war Woolston escorted a number of minesweepers, engaged in clearing minefields prior to the re-occupation of Stavanger. She remained deployed in the North Sea until August 1945, supporting the military re-occupation of previously German held territories. She was then paid off and reduced to the reserve. Woolston was placed on the disposal list in 1946 and was sold to BISCO on 18 February 1947 to be broken up for scrap at Grangemouth. She was towed to the breaker's yard on the Forth later that year.

== Bibliography ==
- Campbell, John (1985). Naval Weapons of World War II. Annapolis, Maryland: Naval Institute Press. ISBN 0-87021-459-4.
- Chesneau, Roger, ed. (1980). Conway's All the World's Fighting Ships 1922–1946. Greenwich, UK: Conway Maritime Press. ISBN 0-85177-146-7.
- Colledge, J. J.; Warlow, Ben (2006) [1969]. Ships of the Royal Navy: The Complete Record of All Fighting Ships of the Royal Navy from the 15th Century to the Present (3rd Rev ed.). London: Chatham Publishing. ISBN 978-1-86176-281-8. OCLC 67375475.
- Cocker, Maurice. Destroyers of the Royal Navy, 1893–1981. Ian Allan. ISBN 0-7110-1075-7.
- Friedman, Norman (2009). British Destroyers From Earliest Days to the Second World War. Annapolis, Maryland: Naval Institute Press. ISBN 978-1-59114-081-8.
- Gardiner, Robert & Gray, Randal, eds. (1985). Conway's All the World's Fighting Ships 1906–1921. Annapolis, Maryland: Naval Institute Press. ISBN 0-85177-245-5.
- Lenton, H. T. (1998). British & Empire Warships of the Second World War. Annapolis, Maryland: Naval Institute Press. ISBN 1-55750-048-7.
- March, Edgar J. (1966). British Destroyers: A History of Development, 1892–1953; Drawn by Admiralty Permission From Official Records & Returns, Ships' Covers & Building Plans. London: Seeley Service. OCLC 164893555.
- Preston, Antony (1971). 'V & W' Class Destroyers 1917–1945. London: Macdonald. OCLC 464542895.
- Raven, Alan & Roberts, John (1979). 'V' and 'W' Class Destroyers. Man o'War. Vol. 2. London: Arms & Armour. ISBN 0-85368-233-X.
- Rohwer, Jürgen (2005). Chronology of the War at Sea 1939–1945: The Naval History of World War Two (Third Revised ed.). Annapolis, Maryland: Naval Institute Press. ISBN 1-59114-119-2.
- Whinney, Bob (2000). The U-boat Peril: A Fight for Survival. Cassell. ISBN 0-304-35132-6.
- Whitley, M. J. (1988). Destroyers of World War 2. Annapolis, Maryland: Naval Institute Press. ISBN 0-87021-326-1.
- Winser, John de D. (1999). B.E.F. Ships Before, At and After Dunkirk. Gravesend, Kent: World Ship Society. ISBN 0-905617-91-6.
