= HMS Whimbrel (U29) =

Sloop of the Royal Navy

Coordinates: 31.1917661°N 29.8611456°E

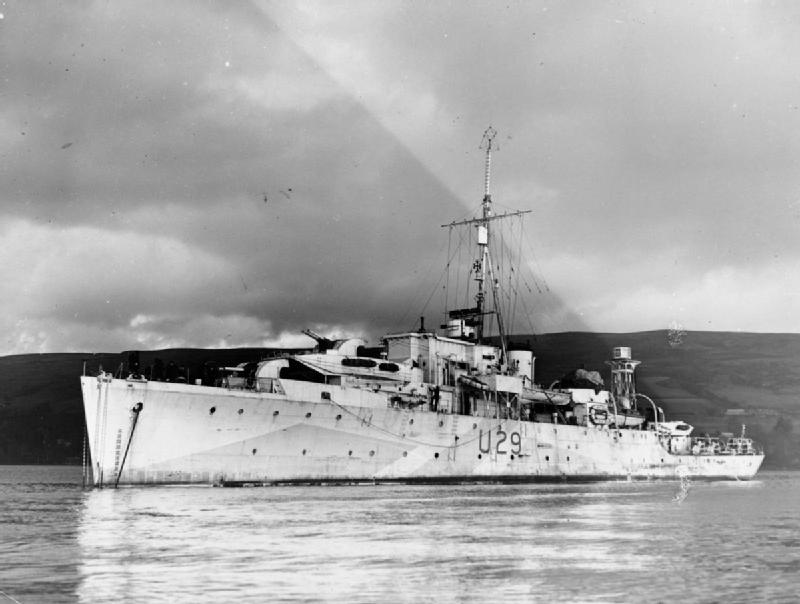
- Whimbrel during World War II

History

United Kingdom
- Name: Whimbrel
- Builder: Yarrow Shipbuilders
- Laid down: 31 October 1941
- Launched: 25 August 1942
- Commissioned: 13 January 1943
- Identification: Pennant number U29
- Honours and awards: Sicily, 1943; Atlantic 1943–44; Normandy 1944; English Channel 1944; Arctic 1944; Okinawa 1945
- Fate: Sold to Egypt, November 1949

Egypt
- Name: El Malek Farouq
- Acquired: November 1949
- Renamed: Tariq 1954
- Status: Laid up as training ship

General characteristics
- Class & type: Black Swan-class sloop
- Displacement: 1,250 tons original; 1,350 tons modified
- Length: 299 ft 6 in (91.29 m)
- Beam: 37 ft 6 in (11.43 m) original; 38 ft 6 in (11.73 m) modified
- Draught: 11 ft (3.4 m)
- Propulsion: Geared turbines, 2 shafts: 3,600 hp (2.68 MW) (original); 4,300 hp (3.21 MW) (modified)
- Speed: 19 knots (35 km/h) (original); 20 knots (37 km/h) (modified)
- Range: 7,500 nmi (13,900 km) at 12 kn (22 km/h)
- Complement: 180 (original); 192 (modified)
- Armament: 6 × QF 4 in (102 mm) Mk XVI AA guns (3 × 2); 4 × 2-pounder AA pom-pom; 4 × 0.5-inch (12.7 mm) AA machine guns (original); 12 × 20 mm Oerlikon AA (6 × 2) (modified); Depth charges 40 (110 modified)

HMS Whimbrel is the only remaining Royal Navy warship that was present at the Surrender of Japan in World War II. She was a sloop of the Black Swan-class,

Whimbrel was laid down at Yarrow Shipbuilders on 31 October 1941. She was commissioned on 13 January 1943 with the pennant number U29.

HMS Whimbrel worked as a convoy escort in an anti-submarine warfare role during the war gaining extenive battle honours.

After the war HMS Whimbrel was sold to Eygpt is laid up in Alexandria as a training ship. In 2006 there was an unsuccessful attempt to bring her back to the UK as a museum ship. In 2016, the Eygptian government offered to sell her bank to the National Museum of the Royal Navy.

== Second World War Service ==
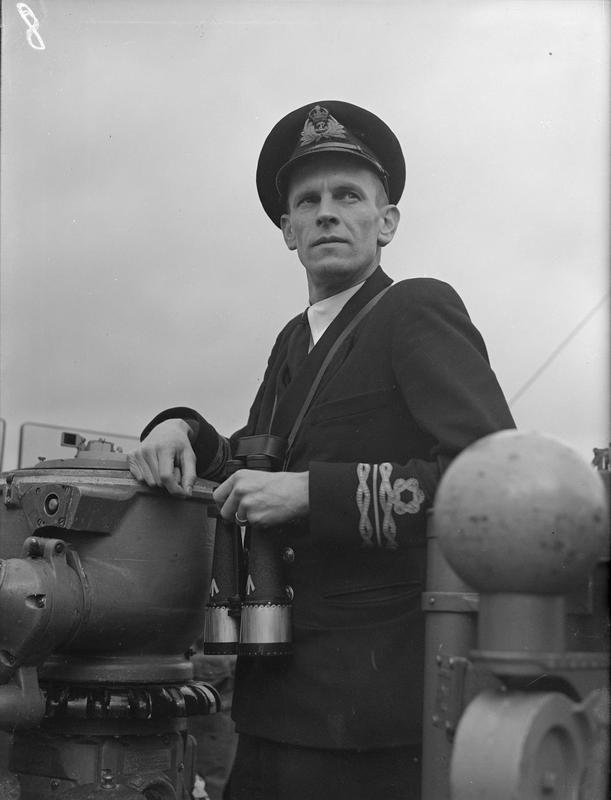
Lt Cdr W.J.Moore RNR, first commanding officer of Whimbrel shortly after commissioning at Greenock, 27 January 1943 (IWM A14160)

Launched on 25 August 1942 almost nine months after laying down which was about average for this class of vessel. She was commissioned on 13 January 1943 and was to primarily serve in the Atlantic as part of several escort groups. In 1945 she was sent to the Pacific for the last few months in war being part of the large exodus of ships there. She was present at the Japanese surrender.

== Post war ==
In November 1949 she was sold to Egypt and renamed El Malek Farouq. In 1954 she was renamed Tariq.

A preservation attempt launched in 2006 aimed to bring her to Canning Dock Liverpool as a memorial to those who died on the Atlantic Convoys. On 26 March 2008 a plaque celebrating the ship was presented to the Mayor of Sefton. John Livingston, president of the Liverpool branch of the Whimbrel Project, said: "She’d be a marvellous addition to our waterfront and a reminder of the sacrifice of our seamen". The Mayor of Sefton, Cllr Richard Hands, said: "HMS Whimbrel forms a unique part of both our social and maritime history and I fully support the campaign to bring her back to Liverpool". The attempt stalled when it was not possible to agree a price with the Egyptian Government. Then, in 2016, it was reported in Parliament that the Egyptian Navy had offered her for sale to the National Museum of the Royal Navy, Portsmouth for £725,000, and that the museum had shown an interest in housing HMS Whimbrel and is investigating the possibility of bringing it back to the UK.

She currently is laid up at Alexandria as a training ship.

=== HMS Whimbrel and the Hornsea Connection ===
HMS Whimbrel (U29), a Black Swan-class sloop built by Yarrow Shipbuilders in Glasgow, holds significant historical and cultural value as the only remaining Royal Navy warship to have been present at the Surrender of Japan in Tokyo Bay during World War II. The ships Battle Honours include:

- Sicily, 1943
- Atlantic, 1943–44
- Normandy, 1944
- English Channel, 1944
- Arctic, 1944
- Okinawa, 1945

Whimbrel also played a role in convoy escort missions and anti-submarine warfare during the war.

In 1942, the town of Hornsea sponsored the HMS Whimbrel. The Hornsea district initially set a fundraising target of £5,500 but exceeded expectations by raising over £15,000, equivalent to £611,052 in 2025. John Miller, chairman of the Hornsea Civic Society, commented:

"Hornsea district sponsored HMS Whimbrel. The target was £5,500 but in the end the Hornsea district raised over £15,000—that’s around £9.2 million in today’s money."

This effort is commemorated in Hornsea through Whimbrel Avenue, named after the ship.

HMS Whimbrel is currently in dry dock in Egypt, where efforts to preserve the ship as a naval heritage monument have faced significant challenges. Over the last two decades, negotiations for her acquisition have stalled due to high costs demanded by the Egyptian government. As one of the last surviving Royal Navy ships from World War II that is not yet preserved as a museum, advocates stress the importance of saving HMS Whimbrel.

== Publications ==
- Colledge, J. J.; Warlow, Ben (2006) [1969]. Ships of the Royal Navy: The Complete Record of All Fighting Ships of the Royal Navy from the 15th Century to the Present (3rd Rev ed.). London: Chatham Publishing. ISBN 978-1-86176-281-8. OCLC 67375475.
- Hague, Arnold (1993). Sloops: A History of the 71 Sloops Built in Britain and Australia for the British, Australian and Indian Navies 1926–1946. Kendal, England: World Ship Society. ISBN 0-905617-67-3.
