= HMS Waldegrave (K579) =

Frigate of the Royal Navy

History

United States
- Name: unnamed (DE-570)
- Builder: Bethlehem-Hingham Shipyard, Hingham, Massachusetts
- Laid down: 16 October 1943
- Launched: 4 December 1943
- Completed: 25 January 1944
- Commissioned: never
- Fate: Transferred to United Kingdom 25 January 1944
- Acquired: Returned by United Kingdom 3 December 1945
- Stricken: 21 January 1946
- Fate: Sold 1946 for scrapping; Scrapped June 1948

United Kingdom
- Name: HMS Waldegrave (K579)
- Namesake: Admiral William Waldegrave, 1st Baron Radstock (1753–1825), who rendered distinguished service as commanding officer of HMS Courageux off Toulon, France, in 1793
- Acquired: 25 January 1944
- Commissioned: 25 January 1944
- Decommissioned: 1945
- Fate: Returned to United States 3 December 1945

General characteristics
- Displacement: 1,400 long tons (1,422 t)
- Length: 306 ft (93 m)
- Beam: 36.75 ft (11.2 m)
- Draught: 9 ft (2.7 m)
- Propulsion: Two Foster-Wheeler Express "D"-type water-tube boilers; GE 13,500 shp (10,070 kW) steam turbines and generators (9,200 kW); Electric motors for 12,000 shp (8,900 kW); Two shafts
- Speed: 24 knots (44 km/h)
- Range: 5,500 nautical miles (10,200 km) at 15 knots (28 km/h)
- Complement: 186
- Sensors & processing systems: SA & SL type radars; Type 144 series Asdic; MF Direction Finding antenna; HF Direction Finding Type FH 4 antenna
- Armament: 3 × 3 in (76 mm) /50 Mk.22 guns; 1 × twin Bofors 40 mm mount Mk.I; 7–16 × 20 mm Oerlikon guns; Mark 10 Hedgehog antisubmarine mortar; Depth charges; QF 2-pounder naval gun
- Notes: Pennant number K579

The second HMS Waldegrave (K579), and the first to enter service, was a British Captain-class frigate of the Royal Navy in commission during World War II. Originally constructed as a United States Navy Buckley class destroyer escort, she served in the Royal Navy from 1944 to 1945.

== Construction and transfer ==
The ship was laid down as the unnamed U.S. Navy destroyer escort DE-570 by Bethlehem-Hingham Shipyard, Inc., in Hingham, Massachusetts, on 16 October 1943 and launched on 4 December 1943. She was transferred to the United Kingdom upon completion on 25 January 1944.

== Service history ==
The ship was commissioned into service in the Royal Navy as the frigate HMS Waldegrave (K579) on 25 January 1944 simultaneously with her transfer. She served in the Royal Navy for the duration of World War II, garnering battle honours for her operations in the North Atlantic Ocean and English Channel and the Normandy Landings at the American Beachheads.

The Royal Navy returned Waldegrave to the U.S. Navy on 3 December 1945.

== Disposal ==
The U.S. Navy struck Waldegrave from its Naval Vessel Register on 21 January 1946. She soon was sold to the Atlas Steel and Supply Company of Cleveland, Ohio, for scrapping, then resold later in 1946 to the Kulka Steel and Equipment Company of Alliance, Ohio, and sold a third and final time on 8 December 1946 to the Bristol Engineering Company of Somerset, Massachusetts. She was scrapped in June 1948.
