= British Iron & Steel Corporation =

The British Iron & Steel Corporation (Salvage) Ltd., commonly referred to as BISCO, was an organisation created during World War II to recycle scrap steel.

BISCO's duties included making the arrangements for the scrapping of surplus Royal Navy ships. The Admiralty would notify BISCO that a ship was available for scrapping; BISCO would then allocate it to a suitable yard for breaking up. The yards were paid their dismantling costs plus an amount per ton of steel recovered. This continued until 1962, after which yards were free to make their own contracts directly.

== Bibliography ==
- Johnston, Ian & Buxton, Ian (2013). The Battleship Builders: Constructing and Arming British Capital Ships. Barnsley, UK: Seaforth Publishing. ISBN 978-1-84832-093-2.
