= List of ships built by Harland & Wolff (1930–2002) =

The following is a list of ships that were built by Harland & Wolff, a heavy industrial company specialising in shipbuilding and offshore construction. It is based in Belfast, Northern Ireland, and had yards at Govan (1914–1963) and Greenock (1920–1928) in Scotland. The 1,600 ships are listed in order of the date of their launch. This list covers the period 1930–2002.

== 1930s ==
- MV William Wilberforce, cargo ship for British & African Steamship Co, launched 14 January 1930, completed 10 May 1930.
- MV Genova, cargo ship for Argentine Navigation Co, launched 28 January 1920, completed 27 May 1930.
- SS Baron Napier, cargo ship for H Hogarth & Sons, launched 12 February 1930, completed 21 March 1930.
- MV Silvercypress, cargo ship for Silver Line, launched 18 February 1930, completed 18 June 1930.
- MV Edward Blyden, cargo ship for British & African Steamship Co, launched 27 February 1930, completed 29 May 1930.
- MV Macgregor Laird, cargo ship for British & African Steamship Co, launched 28 February 1930, completed 3 July 1930.
- MV Innisfallen, ferry for City of Cork Steam Packet Co, launched 4 March 1930, completed 14 June 1930.
- Celedonia, lighter for Argentine Navigation Co, launched 5 March 1930, completed 25 March 1930.
- MV Silverwalnut, cargo ship for Silver Line, launched 15 April 1930, completed 23 July 1930.
- SS Baron Erskine, cargo ship for H Hogarth & Sons, launched 17 March 1930, completed 17 April 1930.
- SS Prestatyn Rose, cargo ship for Richard Hughes & Co, launched 28 April 1930, completed 20 May 1930.
- MV Alfred Jones, cargo ship for British & African Steamship Co, launched 29 April 1930, completed 20 August 1930.
- MV Warwick Castle, passenger ship for Union Castle, launched 29 April 1930, completed 16 January 1931, maiden voyage 30 January 1931, sunk by U-413 on 14 November 1942.
- MV Hamburgo, cargo ship for Argentine Navigation Co, launched 8 May 1930, completed 17 September 1930.
- SS Anglesea Rose, cargo ship for Richard Hughes & Co, launched 12 May 1930, completed 7 June 1930.
- SS Ebano, asphalt carrier for Ebano Oil Co, launched 27 May 1930, completed 30 October 1930.
- MV Silverteak, cargo ship for Silver Line, launched 29 May 1930, completed 2 September 1930.
- SS Medoc, cargo ship for Worms & Cie, launched 30 May 1930, completed 26 June 1930.
- MV Foylebank, cargo ship for Bank Line, launched 12 June 1930, completed 10 November 1930.
- SS Pomerol, cargo ship for Worms & Cie, launched 12 June 1930, completed 8 July 1930.
- MV Guayra, ferry for Argentine Navigation Co, launched 26 June 1930, completed 14 November 1930.
- MV Silversandal, cargo ship for Silver Line, launched 26 June 1930, completed 19 September 1930.
- MV Ciudad de Corrientes, cargo ship for Argentine Navigation Co, launched 30 June 1930, completed 14 October 1930.
- SS San Antonio, cargo ship for French Line, launched 1 July 1930, completed 24 September 1930.
- SS Chateau Larose, cargo ship for Worms & Cie, launched 10 July 1930, completed 23 August 1930.
- MV Laganbank, cargo ship for Bank Line, launched 10 July 1930, completed 11 December 1930.
- SS Chateau Pavie, cargo ship for Worms & Cie, launched 11 August 1930, completed 11 September 1930.
- SS San Diego, cargo ship for French Line, launched 14 August 1930, completed 11 November 1930.
- SS Ganges, cargo ship for Nourse Line, launched 26 August 1930, completed 29 October 1930, sunk by enemy action 1942.
- SS San Francisco, cargo ship for French Line, launched 11 September 1930, completed 10 December 1930.
- MV Reina del Pacifico, passenger ship for PSNC, launched 23 September 1930, completed 24 March 1931, scrapped 1958.
- SS Maurice Rose, cargo ship for Richard Hughes & Co, launched 25 September 1930, completed 24 October 1930.
- SS Somali, cargo ship for Hain Shipping Co, launched 9 October 1930, completed 18 December 1930.
- SS Dennis Rose, cargo ship for Richard Hughes & Co, launched 14 October 1930, completed 7 November 1930.
- MV Cuidad de Concepcion, ferry for Argentine Navigation Co, launched 22 October 1930, completed 25 January 1931.
- SS San Jose, cargo ship for French Line, launched 23 October 1930, completed 23 January 1931.
- SS San Mateo, cargo ship for French Line, launched 20 November 1930, completed 6 March 1931.
- SS Rockabill, coaster for Clyde Shipping Co, launched 10 December 1930, completed 29 January 1931.
- SS San Pedro, cargo ship for French Line, launched 20 December 1930, completed 17 April 1931.
- SS Triona, cargo ship for British Phosphate Carriers, launched 22 January 1931, completed 21 March 1931.
- SS Autocarrier, ferry for Southern Railways Co, launched 5 February 1931, completed 26 March 1931.
- PS Ogeni, stern-wheel paddle steamer for Elder Dempster, launched 5 March 1931, completed 17 April 1931.
- MV Cliona, oil tanker for Anglo Saxon Petroleum Co, launched 14 May 1931, completed 14 October 1931.
- SS Maracay, oil tanker for Lago Shipping Co, launched 21 May 1931, completed 16 June 1931.
- MV Conch, oil tanker for Anglo Saxon Petroleum Co, launched 2 July 1931, completed 22 December 1931.
- MV Georgic, passenger ship for White Star Line, launched 12 November 1931, completed 10 June 1932, maiden voyage 25 June 1932, scrapped 1956.
- MV Highland Patriot, passenger ship for Nelson Steamship Co, launched 10 December 1931, completed 15 May 1932, torpedoed and sunk 1940.
- East Goodwin, lightship for Trinity House, launched 23 December 1931, completed 13 April 1932.
- SS Floating Crane No.2, floating crane for Cowans, Sheldon & Co, launched 15 March 1932, completed 20 August 1932.
- SS Royal Iris II, ferry for Wallasey Corporation, launched 22 March 1932, completed 12 May 1932.
- SS Baron Ardrossan, cargo ship for H Hogarth & Sons, launched 4 May 1932, completed 4 June 1932.
- TS Duchess of Hamilton, (Govan-built), Clyde steamer for Caledonian Steam Packet Co, launched 5 May 1932, completed 24 June 1932, scrapped 1974.
- SS Bhadravati, ferry for Bombay Steam Navigation Co, launched 5 July 1932, completed 10 September 1932.
- North Carr Lightship, (Clyde-built), lightship for Trinity House, launched 2 December 1932, completed 27 February 1933
- MV Waiwera, refrigerated cargo ship for Shaw Savill Line, launched 1 May 1934, completed 29 August 1934.
- SS Chandravati, ferry for Bombay Steam Navigation Co, launched 4 July 1933, completed 31 August 1933.
- SS Baron Dunmore, cargo ship for H Hogarth & Sons, launched 9 August 1933, completed 22 September 1933.
- SS Prabhavati, ferry for Bombay Steam Navigation Company, launched 17 August 1933, completed 28 September 1933.
- SS Baron Elgin, cargo ship for H Hogarth & Sons, launched 6 September 1933, completed 4 October 1933.
- MY Idalia, yacht for Alan F Craig, launched 9 May 1934, completed 2 July 1934.
- HMS Sir Hastings Anderson, target towing ship for British Admiralty, launched 14 June 1934, completed 12 September 1934.
- MV Waipawa, refrigerated cargo ship for Shaw Savill Line, launched 28 June 1934, completed 19 October 1934.
- ST John Dock, tug for South African Railways, launched 26 July 1934, completed 9 October 1934.
- SS Loch Lomond, cargo ship for MacLay & MacIntyre Ltd, launched 16 August 1934, completed 21 September 1934.
- ST Flying Falcon, tug for Clyde Shipping Co, launched 20 August 1934, completed 15 September 1934.
- ST W H Fuller, tug for South African Railways, launched 28 August 1934, completed 9 November 1934.
- MV Imperial Star, refrigerated cargo ship for Blue Star Line, launched 9 October 1934, completed 29 December 1934.
- MV Wairangi, refrigerated cargo ship for Shaw Savill Line, launched 9 October 1934, completed 26 January 1935.
- SS Henzada, cargo ship for P Henderson & Co, launched 11 October 1934, completed 22 November 1934.
- SS Martaban, cargo ship for P Henderson & Co, launched 8 November 1934, completed 26 December 1934.
- MV New Zealand Star, refrigerated cargo ship for Blue Star Line, launched 22 November 1934, completed 1 March 1935.
- SS Baron Cawdor, cargo ship for H Hogarth & Sons, launched 10 December 1934, completed 16 January 1935.
- MV Anadara, oil tanker for Anglo Saxon Petroleum Co, launched 19 December 1934, completed 28 February 1935.
- MV Roslin Castle, refrigerated cargo ship for Union Castle, launched 20 December 1934, completed 4 May 1935, scrapped 1967.
- MV Australia Star, refrigerated cargo ship for Blue Star Line, launched 12 January 1935, completed 17 April 1935.
- MV Mpasa, coaster for Nyasaland Railways, delivered 1 February 1935.
- SS Baron Renfrew, cargo ship for H Hogarth & Sons, launched 6 February 1935, completed 3 March 1935.
- SS Calabar, passenger ship for Elder Dempster, launched 7 February 1935, completed 19 March 1935.
- MV San Arcadio, oil tanker for Eagle Oil and Shipping Company, launched 19 February 1935, completed 17 April 1935.
- MV Rothesay Castle, refrigerated cargo ship for Union Castle, launched 21 February 1935, completed 11 May 1935, ran aground and lost 1940.
- SS Saganaga, cargo ship for Christian Salvesen, launched 6 March 1935, completed 15 April 1935.
- PV Talisman, paddle ferry for London and North Eastern Railway, launched 10 April 1935, completed 12 June 1935.
- TSS Duke of York, ferry for London, Midland and Scottish Railway, launched 7 March 1935 completed 4 June 1935, renamed HMS Duke of Wellington 1942, Duke of York 1948, York 1963 and Fantasia 1964, scrapped 1976.
- SS Inventor, cargo ship for T&J Harrison, launched 3 July 1935, completed 11 September 1935.
- MV Stirling Castle, passenger ship for Union Castle, launched 15 August 1935, completed 29 January 1936, maiden voyage 7 February 1936, scrapped 1966.
- MV Empire Star, refrigerated cargo ship for Blue Star Line, launched 26 September 1935, completed 20 December 1935.
- HMS Penelope, cruiser for British Admiralty, launched 15 October 1935, completed 15 November 1936, torpedoed and sunk 18 February 1944.
- MV Athlone Castle, passenger ship for Union Castle, launched 28 November 1935, completed 13 May 1936, maiden voyage 22 May 1936, scrapped 1965.
- SS Kanimbala, passenger ship for McIlwraith & MacEachern Ltd, launched 12 December 1935, completed 26 April 1936.
- MV Sonavati, ferry for Bombay Steam Navigation Co, launched 26 November 1935, completed 21 February 1936.
- SS Eros, fruit carrier for Erin Steamship Co, launched 9 January 1936, completed 8 April 1936.
- MV Standella, oil tanker for Anglo Saxon Petroleum Co, launched 9 January 1936, completed 16 April 1936.
- MV Sydney Star, refrigerated cargo ship for Blue Star Line, launched 11 January 1936, completed 19 March 1936.
- MS Dunnottar Castle, passenger ship for Union Castle, launched 25 January 1936, completed 27 June 1936, maiden voyage 10 July 1936, renamed Victoria 1958, The Victoria 1976 and Princesa Victoria 1993, scrapped 2004.
- MV Simnia, oil tanker for Anglo Saxon Petroleum Co, launched 20 February 1936, completed 14 May 1936.
- MV Royal Ulsterman, ferry for Burns & Laird Line, launched 10 March 1936, completed 13 June 1936, renamed HMS Royal Ulsterman and Sounion, sunk by mine 3 March 1973.
- MV Royal Scotsman, ferry for Burns & Laird Line, launched 11 March 1936, completed 29 May 1936, renamed HMS Royal Scotsman 1940 and Apollo 1967, scrapped 1984.
- MV Dunvegan Castle, passenger ship for Union Castle, launched 26 March 1936, completed 27 August 1936, renamed HMS Dunvegan Castle, torpedoed and sunk 1940.
- SS Adelong, cargo ship for Huddart Parker, launched 5 May 1936, completed 18 July 1936.
- ST Leonora, tug for McKie & Baxter Ltd, launched 13 May 1936, completed 15 July 1936.
- FV Charles Maciver, trawler for Lancashire Sea Fisheries, launched 27 May 1936, completed 17 July 1936.
- MV Dipavati, ferry for Bombay Steam Navigation Co, launched 14 July 1936, completed 17 September 1936.
- MV Lairdswood, livestock carrier for Burns & Laird Line, launched 21 July 1936, completed 15 August 1936.
- MV Lairdscrest, livestock carrier for Burns & Laird Line, launched 6 August 1936, completed 26 August 1936.
- MV Duchess of Abercorn, ferry for Belfast Harbour Commissioners, launched 25 August 1936, completed 17 March 1937.
- MV Lairdsbank, livestock carrier for Burns & Laird Line, launched 3 September 1936, completed 24 September 1936.
- MV British Power, (Clyde-built), oil tanker for British Tanker Company, launched 16 September 1936, completed 16 December 1936.
- MV Walmer Castle, cargo ship for Union Castle, launched 17 September 1936, completed 30 November 1936. Sunk 21 September 1941 while serving as a convoy rescue ship.
- SS Crossgar, collier for John Kelly Ltd, launched 6 October 1936, completed 28 November 1936 .
- MV British Destiny, (Clyde-built), oil tanker for British Tanker Company, launched 3 November 1936, completed 21 January 1937.
- MV Ernebank, cargo ship for Bank Line, launched 17 November 1936, completed 18 February 1937.
- MV Cameo, coaster for William Robertson Ltd, launched 2 December 1936, completed 3 February 1937.
- MV Sitala, oil tanker for Anglo Saxon Petroleum, launched 29 December 1936, completed 10 March 1937.
- MV May, lightship tender for Commissioners of Irish Lights, launched 14 January 1937, completed 30 March 1937.
- MV Comara, coaster for North Coast Steam Navigation Company, launched 27 January 1937, completed 7 April 1937.
- MV Rochester Castle, refrigerated cargo ship for Union Castle, launched 11 February 1937, completed 29 April 1937.
- SS Torr Head, cargo ship for Ulster Steamship Co, launched 25 February 1937, completed 10 April 1937.
- MV Salacia, cargo ship for Donaldson Line, launched 11 March 1937, completed 17 August 1937.
- MV Lady Sylvia, ferry for Union Steamship Co, launched 16 March 1937, completed 8 May 1937.
- MV Roxburgh Castle, refrigerated cargo ship for Union Castle, launched 25 March 1937, completed 26 June 1937.
- MV Delius, cargo ship for Lamport & Holt, launched 12 April 1937, completed 6 July 1937.
- MV Boardale, oil tanker for British Tanker Company, launched 22 April 1937, completed 7 June 1937.
- MV British Integrity, (Clyde-built), oil tanker for British Tanker Company, launched 22 June 1937, completed 8 September 1937.
- MV Leinster, ferry for British & Irish Steam Packet Co, launched 24 June 1937, completed 2 November 1937.
- SS Donaghadee, collier for John Kelly Ltd, launched 5 August 1937, completed 9 September 1937.
- MV Broomdale, oil tanker for British Tanker Company, launched 2 September 1937, completed 3 November 1937.
- RMMV Capetown Castle, passenger ship for Union Castle, launched 23 September 1937, completed 31 March 1938, scrapped 1967.
- MV Delane, cargo ship for Lamport & Holt, launched 21 October 1937, completed 17 January 1938.
- MV British Trust, oil tanker for British Tanker Co, launched 27 October 1937, completed 19 January 1938.
- MV Munster, ferry for British & Irish Steam Packet Co, launched 3 November 1937, completed 22 February 1938.
- MV British Security, (Clyde-built), oil tanker for British Tanker Company, launched 4 November 1937, completed 29 December 1937, torpedoed and sunk 23 May 1941.
- MV Koolama, cargo ship for West Australian Government, launched 16 December 1937, completed 2 April 1938.
- MV Devis, cargo ship for Lamport & Holt, launched 21 December 1937, completed 14 February 1938.
- MV Lochavon, cargo ship for Royal Mail Line, launched 3 March 1938, completed 29 July 1938.
- HMS Belfast, cruiser for British Admiralty, launched 17 March 1938, completed 3 August 1939, museum ship 1971.
- MV Donax, oil tanker for Anglo Saxon Petroleum Co, launched 28 April 1938, completed 7 July 1938.
- MV Waimarama, cargo ship for Shaw Savill Line, launched 31 May 1938, completed 6 October 1938.
- MV Durban Castle, passenger ship for Union Castle, launched 14 June 1938, completed 15 December 1938.
- MV Dromus, oil tanker for Anglo Saxon Petroleum Company, launched 28 June 1938, completed 14 September 1938, scrapped 1962.
- MV British Fidelity, oil tanker for British Tanker Company, launched 25 August 1938, completed 26 October 1938.
- MV Pretoria Castle, passenger ship for Union Castle, launched 12 October 1938, completed 18 April 1939, renamed HMS Pretoria Castle 1939 and Warwick Castle 1946, scrapped 1962.
- RFA Cairndale, oil tanker for British Admiralty, launched 25 October 1938, completed 26 January 1939, sunk on 30 May 1941.
- MV Richmond Castle, refrigerated cargo ship for Union Castle, launched 8 November 1938, completed 11 February 1939.
- MV Rowallan Castle, refrigerated cargo ship for Union Castle, launched 8 December 1938, completed 11 March 1939.
- MV San Emiliano, oil tanker for Eagle Oil Co, launched 20 December 1938, completed 5 April 1939.
- SS Bangalow, coaster for North Coast Navigation Co, launched 25 January 1939, completed 15 March 1939.
- RMS Andes, passenger ship for Royal Mail Line, launched 7 March 1939, completed 24 September 1939, scrapped 1971.
- MV Degei, ferry for Government of Fiji, delivered 18 April 1939.
- MV Wellington Star, refrigerated cargo ship for Blue Star Line, launched 20 April 1939, completed 24 August 1939.
- ST Theodor Woker, tug for Government of South Africa, launched and completed 23 May 1939.
- MV Auckland Star, refrigerated cargo ship for Blue Star Line, launched 20 June 1939, completed 4 November 1939.
- ST Watermayer T H, tug for Government of South Africa, launched 6 July 1939, completed 1 November 1939.
- MV Waiotira, passenger ship for Shaw Savill Line, launched 1 August 1939, completed 24 November 1939.
- HMS Formidable, aircraft carrier for British Admiralty, launched 17 August 1939, completed 24 November 1940, scrapped 1953.
- HMT Elm, (Clyde-built), Tree-class trawler for British Admiralty, launched 12 December 1939, completed 9 March 1940. Converted to pilot tender Helm in 1946, and to Mozambique as Magul in 1948.
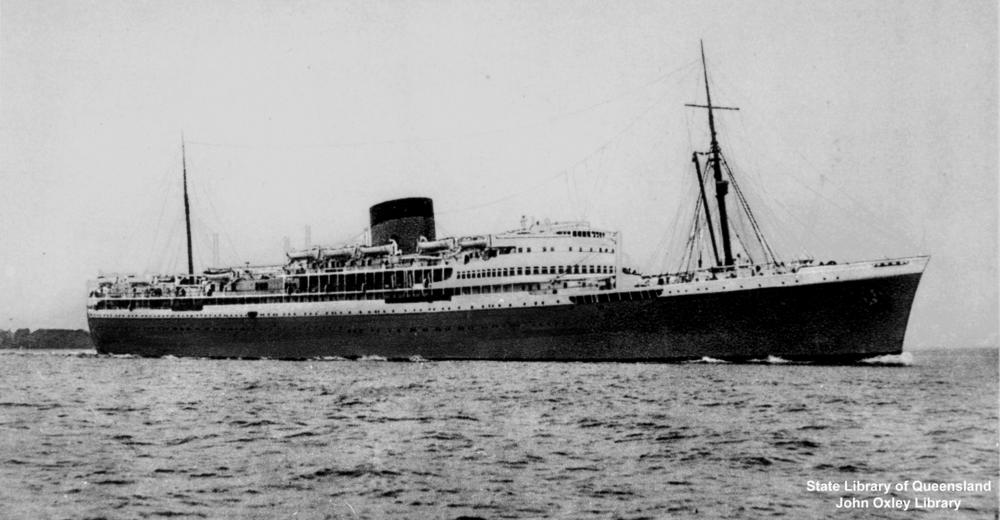
Athlone Castle

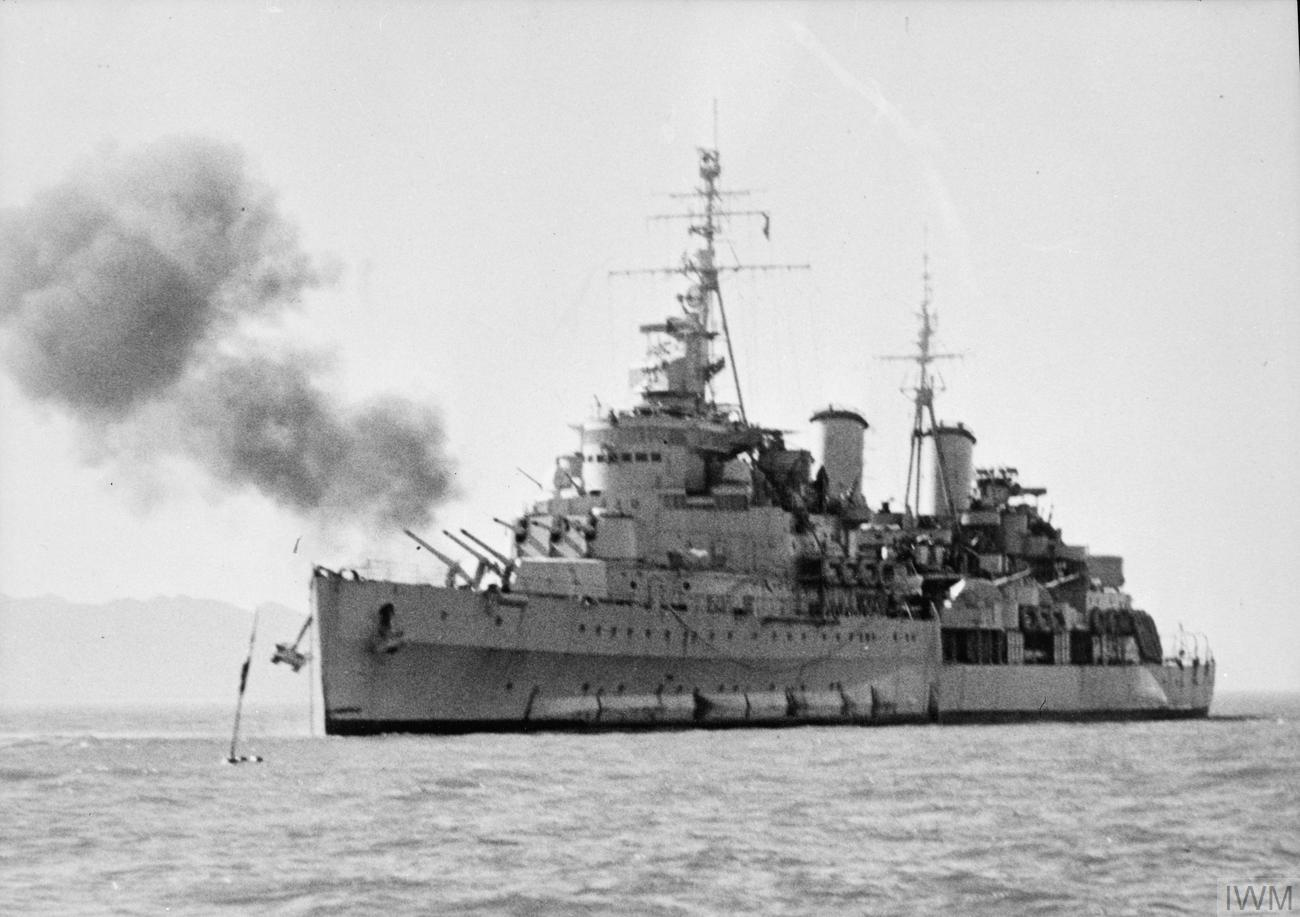
HMS Belfast

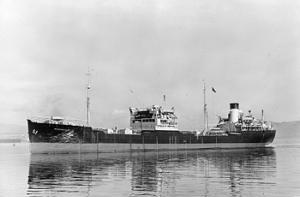
Broomdale

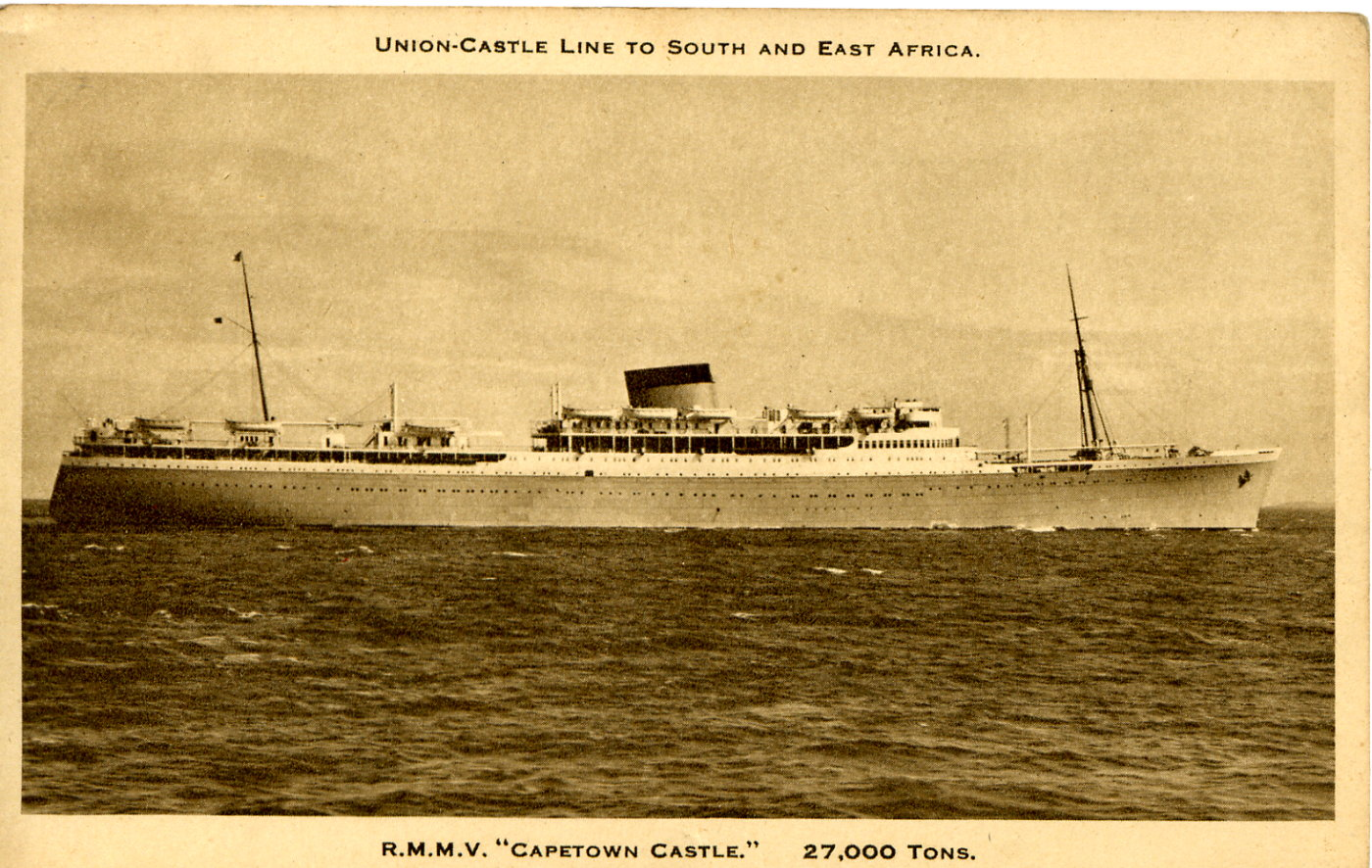
Capetown Castle

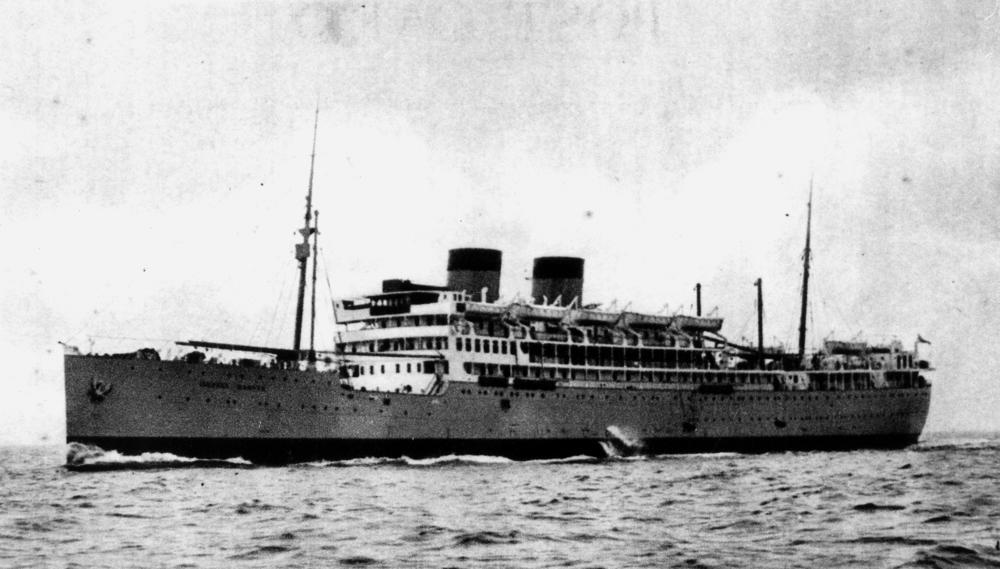
Dunbar Castle

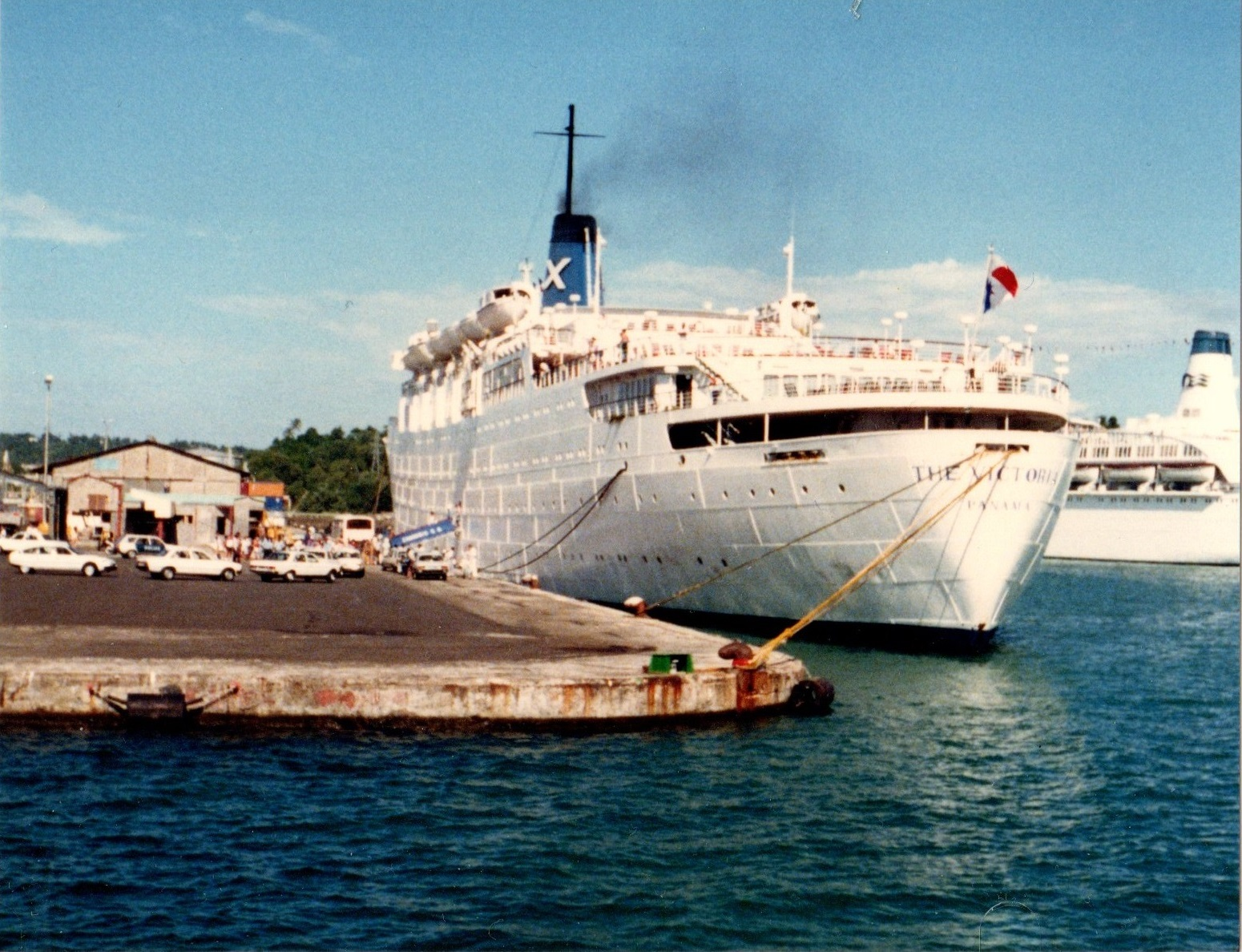
Victoria (launched as Dunnottar Castle)

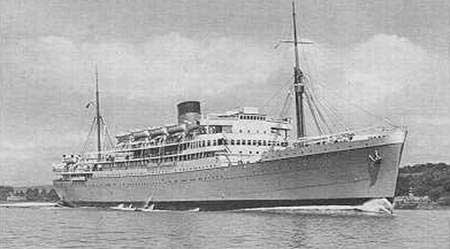
Dunvegan Castle

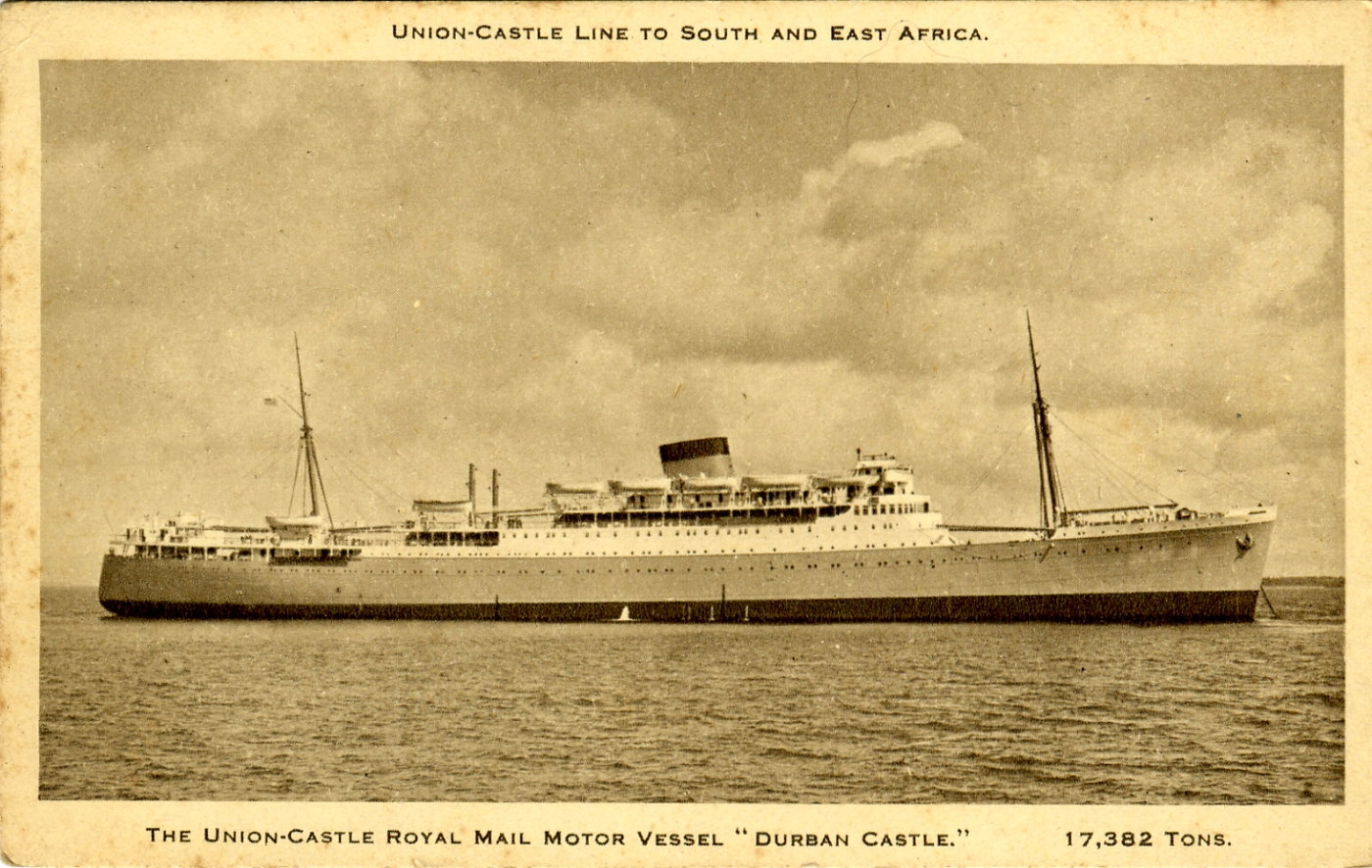
Durban Castle

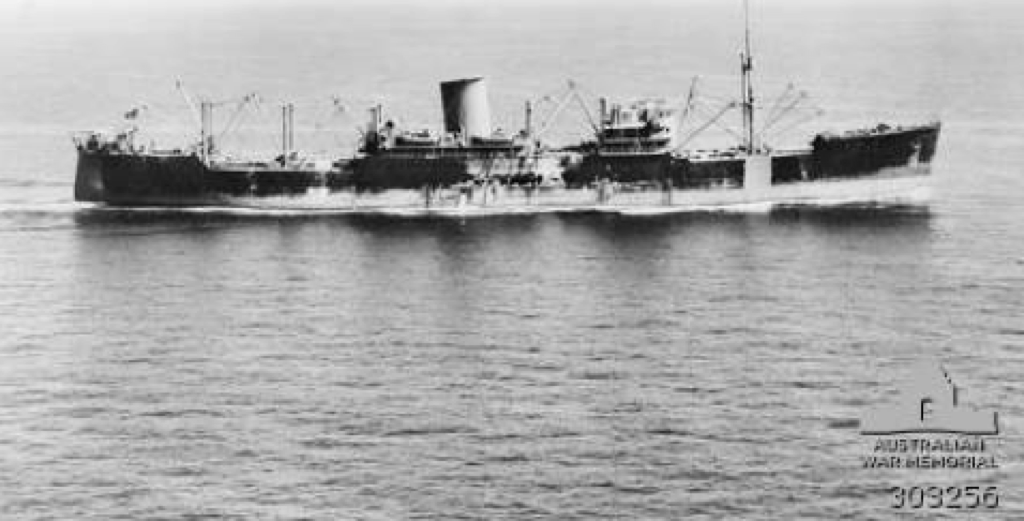
Empire Star

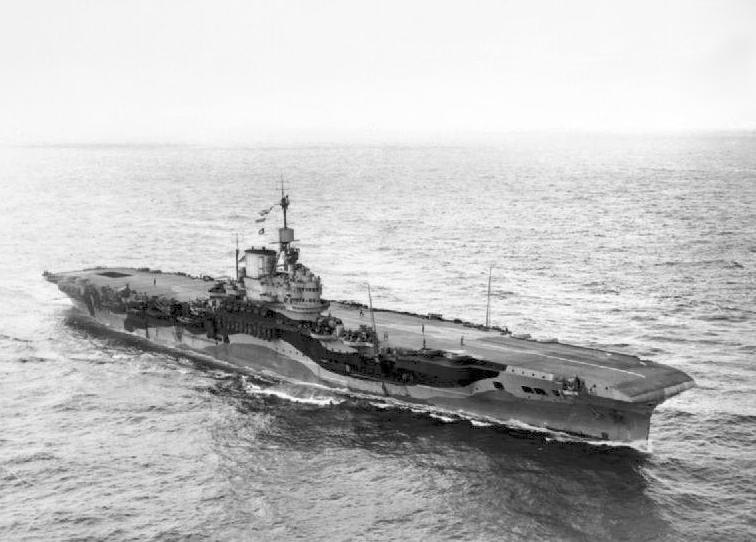
HMS Formidable

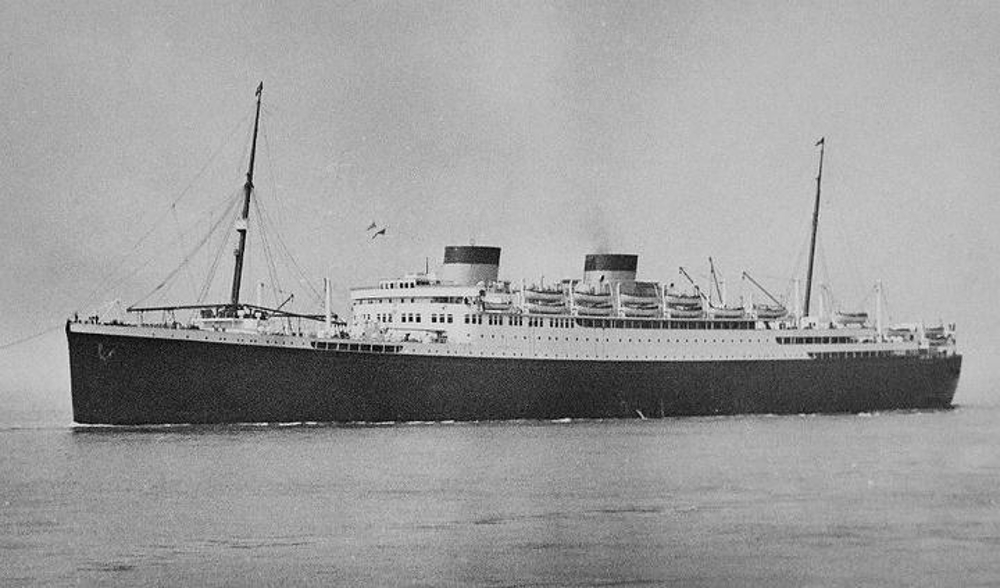
Georgic

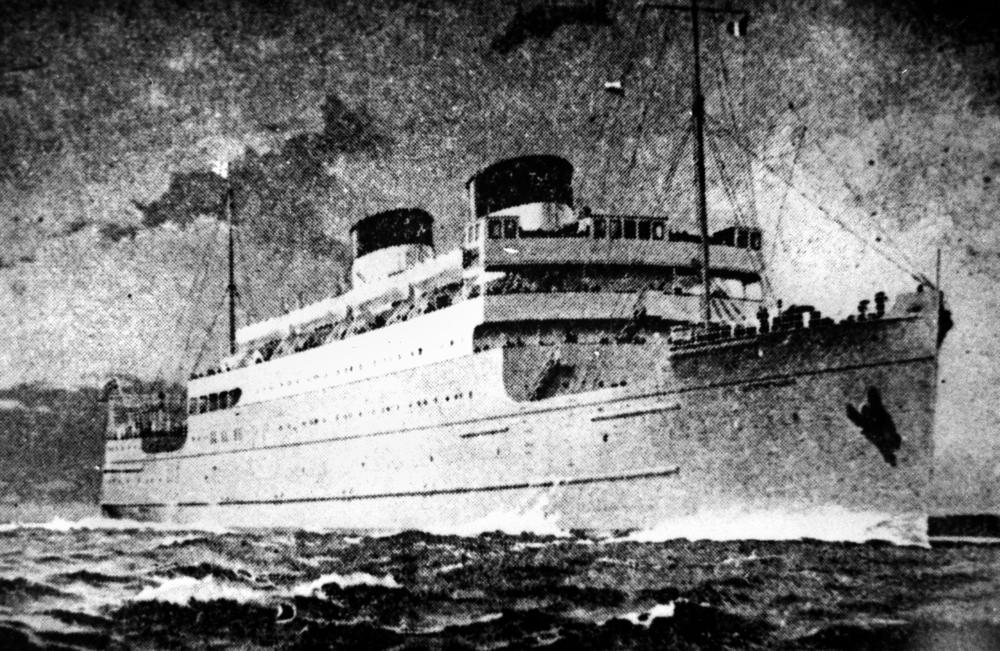
Innisfallen

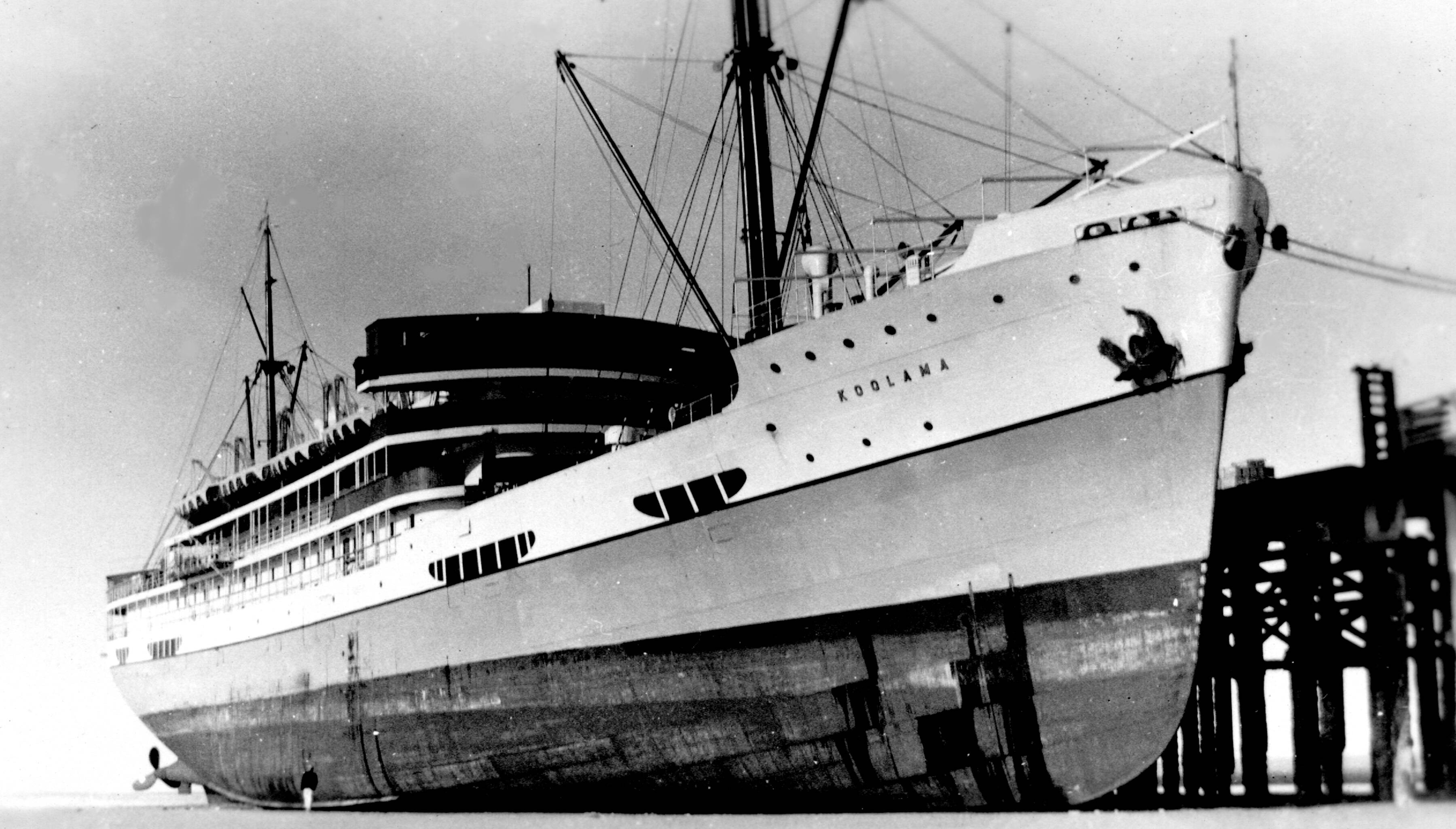
Koolama

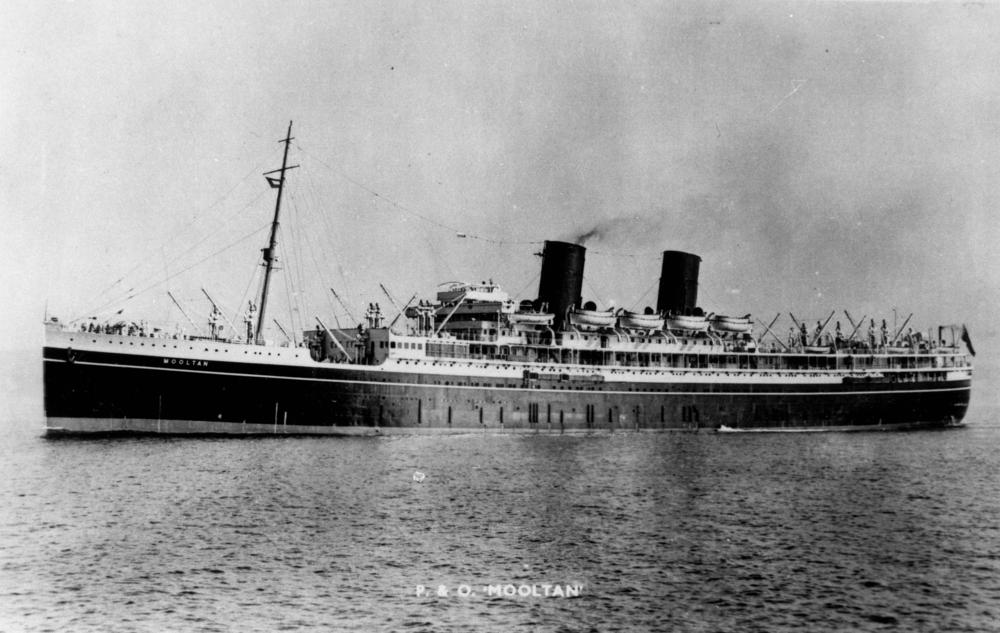
Munster

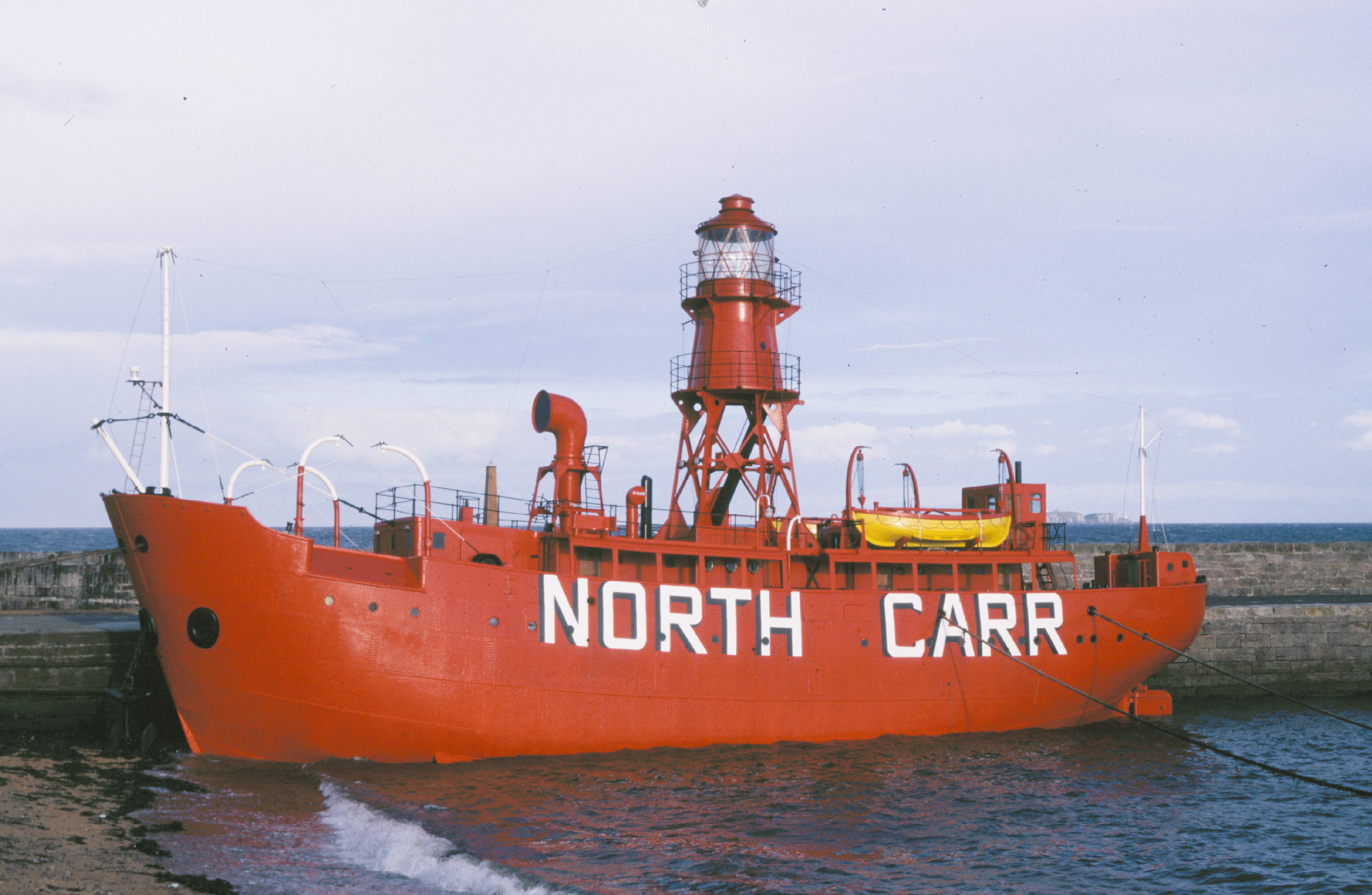
North Carr Lightship

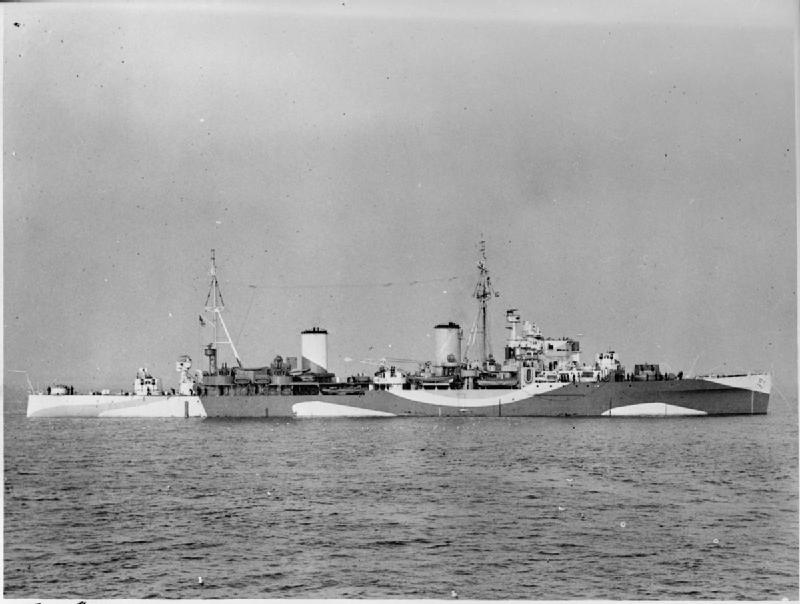
HMS Penelope

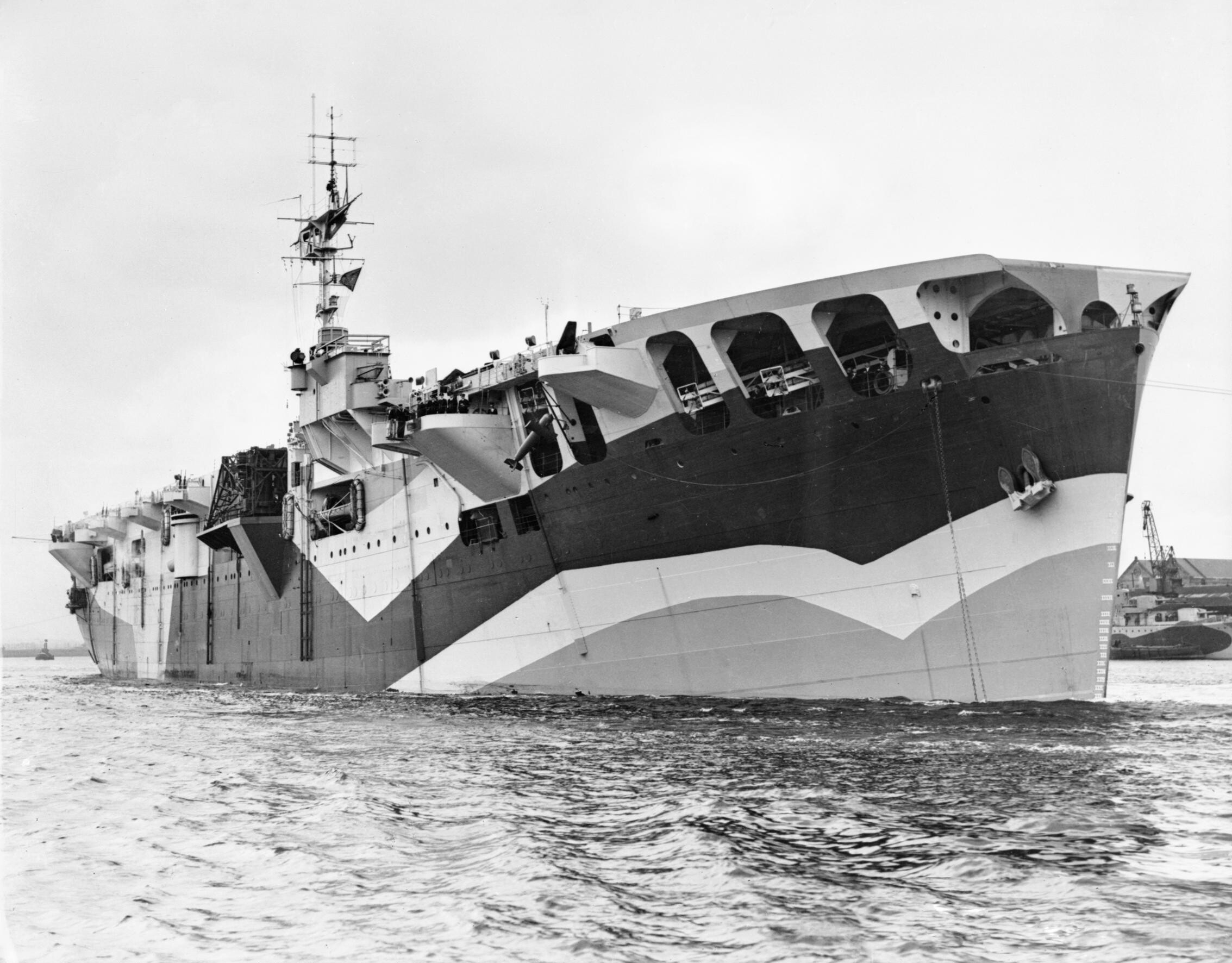
HMS Pretoria Castle

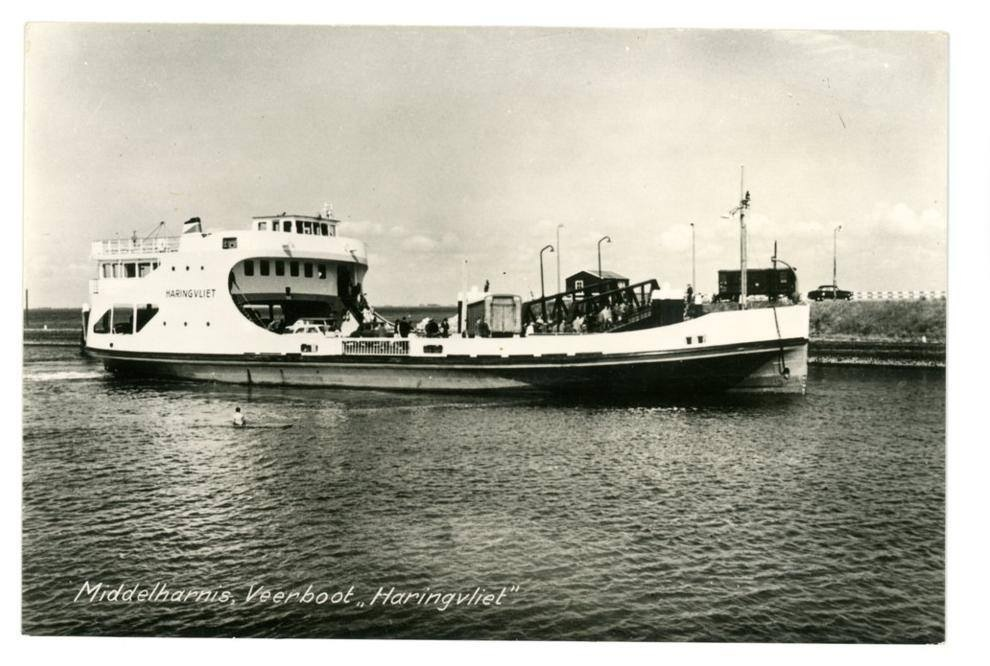
Haringvliet (launched as Royal Iris)

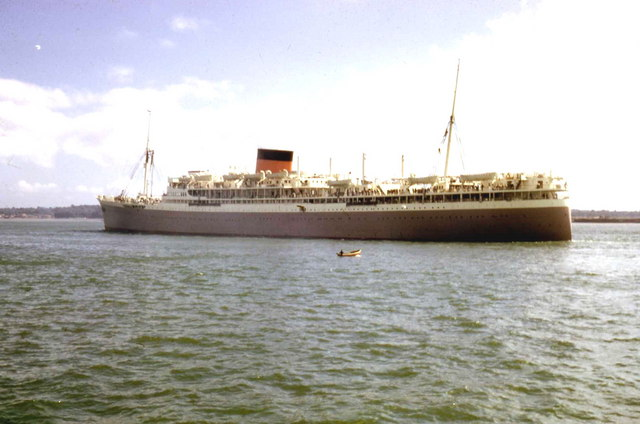
Stirling Castle

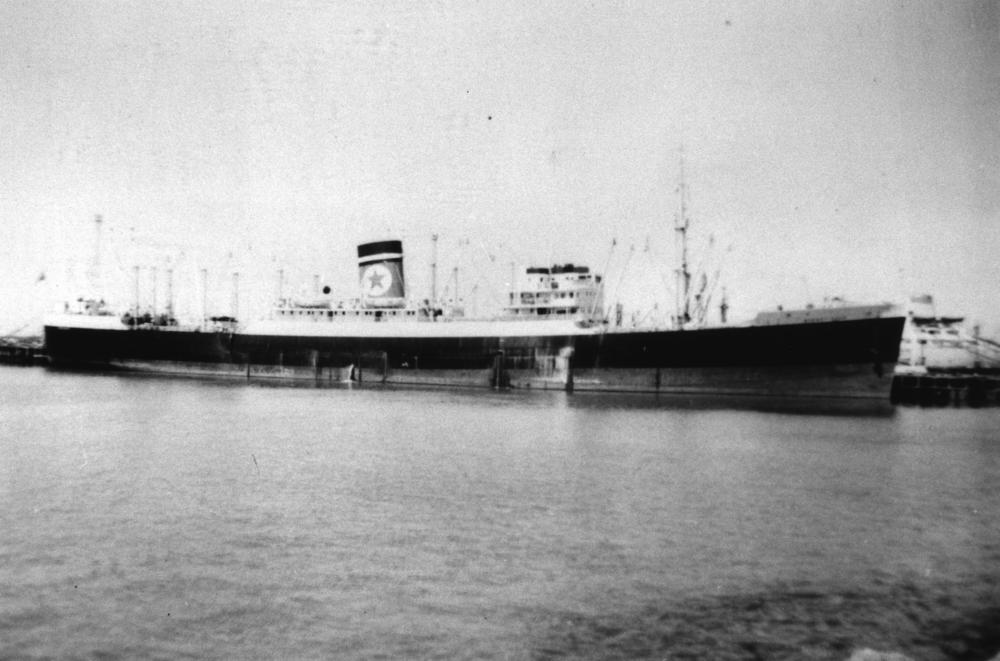
Sydney Star

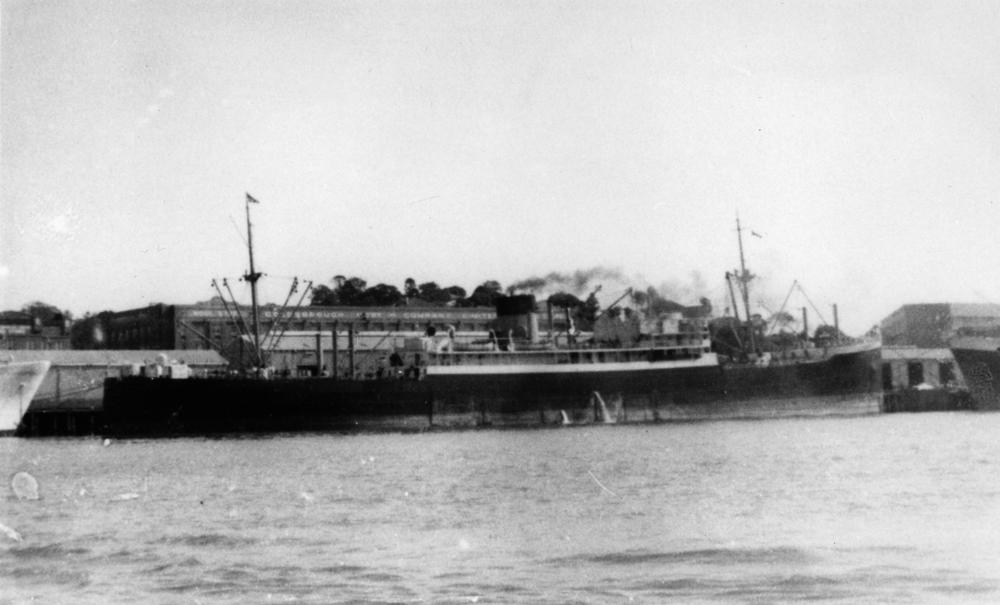
Waipawa

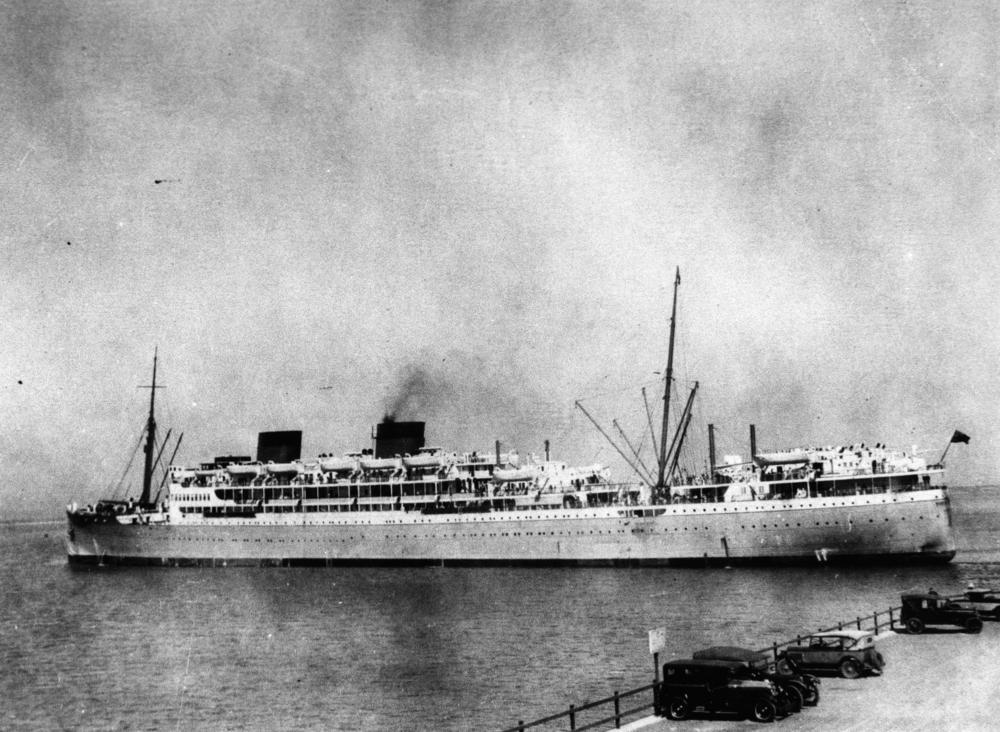
Warwick Castle

== 1940s ==
- HMT Fir, (Clyde-built), Tree-class trawler for British Admiralty, launched 27 January 1940, completed 30 April 1940.
- HMS Arabis, Flower-class corvette for British Admiralty, launched 14 February 1940, completed 5 April 1940, renamed USS Saucy 1942, HMS Snapdragon 1945, SS Katina 1947 and SS Tewfik 1950.
- HMS Periwinkle, Flower-class corvette for British Admiralty, launched 24 February 1940, completed 8 April 1940, renamed USS Restless 1942, Perilock 1947, scrapped 1953.
- HMS Clarkia, Flower-class corvette for British Admiralty, launched 7 March 1940, completed 22 April 1940, scrapped 1947.
- HMS Calendula, Flower-class corvette for British Admiralty, launched 21 March 1940, completed 6 May 1940, renamed USS Ready 1942, Villa Cisneros 1948 and Villa Bens 1949.
- MV Lavington Court, cargo ship for Court Line, launched 21 March 1940, completed 26 June 1940.
- HMS Picotee, Flower-class corvette for British Admiralty, launched 21 March 1940, completed 5 September 1940, torpedoed and sunk 12 August 1941.
- MV Debrett, cargo ship for Lamport & Holt, launched 23 March 1940, completed 23 May 1940.
- HMS Hibiscus, Flower-class corvette for British Admiralty, launched 6 April 1940, completed 21 May 1940, renamed USS Spry 1942 and Madonna 1947, scrapped 1955.
- HMS Heartsease, Flower-class corvette for British Admiralty, launched 20 April 1940, completed 4 June 1940, renamed USS Courage 1942, Roskva 1951, Douglas 1956 and Seabird 1958, sunk December 1958.
- PS Lincoln Castle, paddle steamer for London & North Eastern Railway, launched 27 April 1940, completed 4 July 1941.
- HMS Camellia, Flower-class corvette for British Admiralty, launched 4 May 1940, completed 18 June 1940, renamed Hetty W Vinke 1948, scrapped 1965.
- MV Pardo, refrigerated cargo ship for Royal Mail Line, launched 21 May 1940, completed 15 August 1940.
- HMS Mallow, Flower-class corvette for British Admiralty, launched 22 May 1940, completed 2 July 1940, renamed Nada 1944, Partizanka 1946 and El Sudan 1948.
- HMS Bangor, (Govan-built), Bangor-class minesweeper for British Admiralty, launched 23 May 1940, completed 4 November 1940, renamed KNM Glomma 1945.
- HMS Coreopsis, (Clyde-built), Flower-class corvette for British Admiralty, launched 23 May 1940, completed 17 August 1940, scrapped 1952.
- SS Novelist, cargo ship for T&J Harrison, launched 4 June 1940, completed 8 August 1940.
- HMS Peony, Flower-class corvette for British Admiralty, launched 4 June 1940, completed 2 August 1940, renamed BP Sachtouris 1943, scrapped 1952.
- MV Araybank, cargo ship for Bank Line, launched 6 June 1940, completed 24 October 1940.
- HMS Erica, Flower-class corvette for British Admiralty, launched 18 June 1940, completed 9 August 1940, sunk by mine 9 February 1943.
- MV Defoe, cargo ship for Lamport & Holt, launched 20 June 1940, completed 30 August 1940.
- HMS Crocus, (Clyde-built), Flower-class corvette for British Admiralty, launched 26 June 1940, completed 20 October 1940, renamed Annlock, scrapped 1952.
- HMS Gloxinia, Flower-class corvette for British Admiralty, launched 2 July 1940, completed 22 August 1940, scrapped 1947.
- HMS Blackpool, Bangor-class minesweeper for British Admiralty, launched 4 July 1940, completed 7 February 1941.
- MV Shirrabank, cargo ship for Bank Line, launched 20 July 1940, completed 5 December 1940.
- HMS Gentian, Flower-class corvette for British Admiralty, launched 6 August 1940, completed 22 September 1940, scrapped 1947.
- RFA Black Ranger, oil tanker for British Admiralty, launched 22 August 1940, completed 27 January 1941, renamed Petrola XIV 1973, scrapped 1979.
- SS Fanad Head, cargo ship for Ulster Steamship Co, launched 3 September 1940, completed 19 December 1940.
- MV Potaro, refrigerated cargo ship for Royal Mail Line, launched 4 September 1940, completed 19 November 1940.
- HMS Spiraea, (Clyde-built), Flower-class corvette for British Admiralty, launched 31 October 1940, completed 27 February 1941, renamedThessaloniki 1946.
- MV Pampas, refrigerated cargo ship for Royal Mail Line, launched 2 November 1940, completed 23 January 1941.
- HMS Adamant, submarine depot ship for British Admiralty, launched 30 November 1940, completed 28 February 1942, scrapped 1970.
- RFA Brown Ranger, oil tanker for British Admiralty, launched 12 December 1940, completed 11 April 1941, scrapped 1975.
- MV Palma, refrigerated cargo ship for Royal Mail Line, launched 14 January 1941, completed 2 April 1941.
- RFA Blue Ranger, oil tanker for British Admiralty, launched 29 January 1941, completed 6 June 1941, renamed Korytsa 1972, scrapped 1987.
- HMS Starwort, (Clyde-built), Flower-class corvette for British Admiralty, launched 12 February 1941, completed 26 May 1941, renamed Southern Broom 1948, scrapped 1967.
- RFA Dingledale, (Govan-built), Dale-class oiler for British Admiralty, launched 27 March 1941, completed 10 September 1941, renamed Royaumont 1959, scrapped 1967.
- MV Empire Hope, refrigerated cargo ship for Ministry of Shipping, launched 27 March 1941, completed 22 October 1941, sunk by enemy action 11 August 1942.
- MV Empire Gem, (Govan-built), oil tanker for British Admiralty, launched 29 May 1941, completed 24 October 1941, torpedoed and sunk 24 January 1942.
- MV Empire Diamond, oil tanker for Ministry of War Transport, launched 10 July 1941, completed 12 November 1941, renamed Norsol 1942, Kollbjørg 1946 and Storo 1956, scrapped 1959.
- HMT Rumba, (Clyde-built), Dance-class trawler for British Admiralty, launched 31 July 1940, completed 12 November 1940.
- HMS Hyacinth, Flower-class corvette for British Admiralty, launched 19 August 1940, completed 3 October 1940, renamed Apostolis 1943, scrapped 1952.
- HMT Sarabande, (Clyde-built), Dance-class trawler for British Admiralty, launched 29 August 1940, completed 2 January 1941.
- HMS Rhododendron, Flower-class corvette for British Admiralty, launched 2 September 1940, completed 18 October 1940, renamed Maj Vinke 1950.
- HMS Heather, Flower-class corvette for British Admiralty, launched 17 September 1940, completed 1 November 1940, scrapped 1947.
- HMS Freesia, Flower-class corvette for British Admiralty, launched 3 October 1940, completed 19 November 1940, renamed Freelock 1946, sunk 1 April 1947.
- HMS Orchis, Flower-class corvette for British Admiralty, launched 15 October 1940, completed 29 November 1940, mined and sunk 21 August 1944.
- HMS Kingcup, Flower-class corvette for British Admiralty, launched 31 October 1940, completed 3 January 1941, renamed Rubis 1947 and Seislim 1954, scrapped 1959.
- MV Empire Gat, (Clyde-built), coaster for Ministry of Shipping, launched 13 November 1940, completed 2 April 1941, renamed Borthwick 1947, Agostino in 1960 and Ivy in 1972.
- HMS Bryony, Flower-class corvette for British Admiralty, launched 16 November 1940, completed 16 June 1942, renamed HNoMS Polarfront II 1947.
- HMS Pimpernel, Flower-class corvette for British Admiralty, launched 16 November 1940, completed 9 January 1941, scrapped October 1948.
- HMS Abelia, Flower-class corvette for British Admiralty, launched 28 November 1940, completed 3 February 1941, renamed Kraft 1948 and Arne Skontorp 1954, scrapped 1966.
- HMS TLC 11, Tank Landing Craft for British Admiralty, launched 9 December 1940, completed 16 December 1940.
- HMS TLC 12, Tank Landing Craft for British Admiralty, launched 9 December 1940, completed 16 December 1940.
- HMS Alisma, Flower-class corvette for British Admiralty, launched 17 December 1940, completed 13 February 1941, renamed Laconia 1949, Constantinos S 1950 and Parnon 1952, sunk 16 July 1954.
- HMS Anchusa, Flower-class corvette for British Admiralty, launched 15 January 1941, completed 1 March 1941, renamed Silverlord 1949 and Sir Edgar 1954, scrapped 1960.
- HMS Armeria, Flower-class corvette for British Admiralty, launched 16 January 1941, completed 28 March 1941, renamed Deppie 1948, Canastel 1950, Rio Blanco 1952 and Lillian 1955.
- HMS Aster, Flower-class corvette for British Admiralty, launched 12 February 1941, completed 11 April 1941, scrapped 24 May 1946.
- MV Empire Shoal, (Govan-built), coaster for Ministry of Shipping, launched 13 February 1941, completed 17 June 1941, renamedAngularity 1946 and Elpis 1967, sank 1968.
- HMS Bergamot, Flower-class corvette for British Admiralty, launched 15 February 1941, completed 9 May 1941, renamed Syros 1947, Delphini 1951 and Ekaterina 1955, scrapped 1974.
- HMS TLC 25, Tank Landing Craft for British Admiralty, launched 11 March 1941, completed 25 March 1941.
- HMS TLC 26, Tank Landing Craft for British Admiralty, launched 11 March 1941, completed 25 March 1941.
- HMS Vervain, Flower-class corvette for British Admiralty, launched 12 March 1941, completed 9 June 1941, torpedoed and sunk 20 February 1945.
- HMT Romeo, Shakespearian-class trawler for British Admiralty, launched 20 March 1941, completed 28 June 1941.
- HMS Buttercup, Flower-class corvette for British Admiralty, launched 10 April 1941, completed 24 April 1942, renamed HNoMS Buttercup 1944, HNoMS Nordkyn 1946 and Thoris 1956, scrapped 1969.
- HMS Chrysanthemum, Flower-class corvette for British Admiralty, launched 11 April 1941, completed 26 January 1942, renamedCommandant Drogou 1942, Terje 10 1947 and NRP Caravalho Araujo 1959.
- HMT Rosalind, Shakesperian-class trawler for British Admiralty, launched 3 May 1941, completed 20 October 1941.
- HMS Cowslip, Flower-class corvette for British Admiralty, launched 28 May 1941, completed 9 August 1941, scrapped 1949.
- HMS TLC 100, Tank Landing Craft for British Admiralty, launched 9 June 1941, completed 29 June 1941.
- HMS TLC 101, Tank Landing Craft for British Admiralty, launched 9 June 1941, completed 11 July 1941.
- HMS Eglantine, Flower-class corvette for British Admiralty, launched 11 June 1941, completed 27 August 1941, renamed Soroy 1946.
- HMS TLC 102, Tank Landing Craft for British Admiralty, launched 17 June 1941, completed 31 August 1941.
- HMS TLC 103, Tank Landing Craft for British Admiralty, launched 17 June 1941, completed 16 September 1941.
- MV Empire Onyx, (Govan-built), oil tanker for Ministry of War Transport, launched 21 August 1941, completed 25 December 1941, renamed Nortind 1942, torpedoed and sunk 16 January 1943.
- MV Empire Grace, refrigerated cargo ship for Ministry of War Transport, launched 25 August 1941, completed 1 April 1942, scrapped 1963.
- RFA Derwentdale, (Govan-built), landing ship gantry for British Admiralty, launched 12 April 1941, completed 30 August 1941, renamed Irvingdale I 1959, scrapped 1966.
- MV Empire Spinney, (Clyde-built), coaster for Ministry of War Transport, launched 26 June 1941, completed 23 September 1941, renamed Peregrine 1946, Libya 1965 and Rozmary 1971.
- HMS Fritillary, Flower-class corvette for British Admiralty, launched 22 July 1941, completed 31 October 1941, renamed Andria 1947 and V.D. Chidambaram 1949, scrapped 1955.
- HMS Genista, Flower-class corvette for British Admiralty, launched 24 July 1941, completed 18 December 1941, scrapped 1961.
- HMS Oxlip, (Clyde-built), Flower-class corvette for British Admiralty, launched 28 August 1941, completed 27 December 1941, renamed LÉ Maev 1946.
- MV Empire Sidney, cargo ship for Ministry of War Transport, launched 4 September 1941, completed 7 May 1942, renamed Van der Helst 1943, Tjimenteng 1946 and Diamandis 1963, scrapped 1970.
- MV Empire Deep, coaster for Ministry of War Transport, launched 9 September 1941, completed 30 October 1941, renamed Starkenborgh 1942, Spaarnestroom 1947, Erato Sartes 1961 and Antonios P 1963, scrapped July 1969.
- HMS Pennywort, (Clyde-built), Flower-class corvette for British Admiralty, launched 18 October 1941, completed 5 March 1942, scrapped 1949.
- MV Empire Norseman, oil tanker for Ministry of War Transport, launched 21 October 1941, completed 11 April 1942 as RFA Dinsdale, torpedoed and sunk 31 May 1942.
- MV Empire Ballantyne, (Clyde-built), cargo ship for Ministry of War Transport, launched 21 October 1941, completed 25 February 1942, renamed MV Belgian Airman 1942, torpedoed and sunk 14 April 1945.
- HMS Unicorn, aircraft maintenance carrier for British Admiralty, launched 20 November 1941, completed 12 March 1943, scrapped 1959.
- MV Empire Splendour, cargo ship for Ministry of War Transport, launched 18 December 1941, completed 1 September 1942, renamed Medon 1946 and Tina 1963, scrapped 1970.
- HMS Algerine, Algerine-class minesweeper for British Admiralty, launched 22 December 1941, completed 24 March 1942, torpedoed and sunk 15 November 1942.
- MV Empire Bede, (Govan-built), cargo ship for Ministry of War Transport, launched 6 January 1942, completed 31 March 1942, torpedoed and sunk 18 August 1942.
- MV Empire Chapman, oil tanker for Ministry of War Transport, launched 17 January 1942, completed 25 June 1942, renamed British Commando 1946, scrapped 1959.
- HMS Alarm, Algerine-class minesweeper for British Admiralty, launched 5 February 1942, completed 16 May 1942, lost 2 January 1943.
- MV Empire Spenser, oil tanker for Ministry of War Transport, launched 17 February 1942, completed 29 April 1942, torpedoed and sunk 8 December 1942.
- MV British Vigilance, (Govan-built), oil tanker for Ministry of War Transport, launched 18 February 1942, completed 23 May 1942. Later renamed Empire Vigilance, torpedoed and sunk 24 January 1943.
- HMT Stronsay, Isles-class trawler for British Admiralty, launched 4 March 1942, completed 24 April 1942.
- MV Deseado, refrigerated cargo ship for Royal Mail Line, launched 17 March 1942, completed 28 November 1942.
- HMS Albacore, Algerine-class minesweeper for British Admiralty, launched 2 April 1942, completed 16 June 1942.
- HMT Switha, Isles-trawler for British Admiralty, launched 3 April 1942, completed 15 June 1942.
- MV Empire Fletcher, oil tanker for Ministry of War Transport, launched 4 April 1942, completed 31 July 1942, renamed Backhuysen 1944, Chama 1947 and Anastasia 1955, scrapped 1959.
- HMS Acute, Algerine-class minesweeper for British Admiralty, launched 14 April 1942, completed 30 July 1942.
- MV British Merit, oil tanker for British Tanker Co, launched 16 April 1942, completed 9 July 1942.
- HMS Cadmus, Algerine-class minesweeper for British Admiralty, launched 27 May 1942, completed 9 September 1942.
- MV Empire Strength, cargo ship for Ministry of War Transport, launched 28 May 1942, completed 22 December 1942, renamed Saxon Star 1946, Redbrook 1961 and MV E Evangelia 1965, ran aground and lost 15 October 1968.
- MV San Veronico, oil tanker for Eagle Oil Co, launched 30 May 1942, completed 31 December 1942.
- HMS Circe, Algerine-class minesweeper for British Admiralty, launched 27 June 1942, completed 16 October 1942.
- HMS Espiegle, Algerine-class minesweeper for British Admiralty, launched 12 August 1942, completed 1 December 1942.
- HMS Black Prince, Dido-class cruiser for British Admiralty, launched 27 August 1942, completed 20 November 1943, renamed HMNZS Black Prince 1946, scrapped 1962.
- MV Empire Castle, cargo ship for Ministry of War Transport, launched 27 August 1942, completed 31 January 1943, renamed Gothic Star 1946, Nelson Star 1948, Patagonia Star 1958, Eirini 1961 and Byzantium 1970, scrapped 8 July 1971.
- HMS Fantome, Algerine-class minesweeper for British Admiralty, launched 22 September 1942, completed 22 January 1943.
- HMS Mutine, Algerine-class minesweeper for British Admiralty, launched 10 October 1942, completed 26 February 1943, scrapped 1967.
- MV Vipya, ferry for Nyasaland Railway Co, delivered 23 October 1942.
- HMS Onyx, Algerine-class minesweeper for British Admiralty, launched 27 October 1942, completed 26 March 1943.
- MV Darro, refrigerated cargo ship for Royal Mail Line, launched 21 November 1942, completed 29 June 1943.
- HMS Rattler, Algerine-class minesweeper for British Admiralty, launched 9 December 1942, completed 22 April 1943 and renamed HMS Loyalty, sunk 22 August 1944.
- HMS Ready, Algerine-class minesweeper for British Admiralty, launched 11 January 1943, completed 21 May 1943.
- HMS Rinaldo, Algerine-class minesweeper for British Admiralty, launched 20 March 1943, completed 18 June 1943.
- HMS Rosario, Algerine-class minesweeper for British Admiralty, launched 3 April 1943, completed 9 July 1943.
- HMS Spanker, Algerine-class minesweeper for British Admiralty, launched 20 April 1943, completed 20 August 1943.
- HMS Campania, Nairana-class escort carrier for British Admiralty, launched 17 June 1943, completed 7 March 1944, scrapped 1955.
- HMS Vestal, Algerine-class minesweeper for British Admiralty, launched 19 June 1943, completed 10 September 1943, sunk 26 July 1945.
- MV Pampas, cargo ship for Royal Mail Line, launched 25 September 1943, completed 1 February 1944.
- MV Rowallan Castle, refrigerated cargo ship for Union Castle, launched 23 December 1942, completed 23 April 1943.
- MV Empire Maiden, (Clyde-built), oil tanker for Ministry of War Transport, launched 20 December 1941, completed 10 March 1942, bombed and sunk 14 June 1943, raised and repaired 1948, renamed Asteria 1953 and Sanjacopo 1958, scrapped 1974.
- HMS Kale, (Clyde-built), River-class frigate for British Admiralty, launched 24 June 1942, completed 4 December 1942, scrapped 1957.
- MV Empire Metal, (Govan-built), oil tanker for Ministry of War Transport, launched 30 June 1942, completed 24 September 1942, bombed and sunk 2 January 1943, raised and scrapped 1950.
- MV Empire Fusilier, oil tanker for Ministry of War Transport, launched 8 August 1942, completed 18 February 1943 as MV Empire Bombardier, renamed British Bombardier 1946, scrapped 1959.
- SS Empire Gypsy, (Clyde-built), oil tanker for Ministry of War Transport, launched 31 August 1942, completed 11 November 1942, renamed INS Sambhar 1948.
- MV Empire Grange, cargo ship for Ministry of War Transport, launched 23 September 1942, completed 17 March 1943, renamed King Robert 1946, Ardgem 1961 and Kelso 1967, scrapped 1969.
- MV San Vulfrano, oil tanker for Eagle Oil Co, launched 23 September 1942, completed 30 December 1942.
- HMS Thruster, tank landing craft for British Admiralty, launched 24 September 1942, completed 14 March 1943.
- HMS Bruiser, tank landing craft for British Admiralty, launched 24 October 1942, completed 2 April 1943.
- SS Empire Torrent, (Clyde-built), cargo ship for Ministry of War Transport, launched 29 October 1942, completed 29 December 1942, renamed Argos Hill 1948, Queen Maud 1951, Scotia 1954 and Skotia 1960, scrapped 1962.
- MV Empire Benefit, oil tanker for Ministry of War Transport, launched 24 November 1942, completed 20 April 1943, renamed Athelqueen 1946 and Mariverda 1955, scrapped 1961.
- HMS Tweed, (Clyde-built), River-class frigate for British Admiralty, launched 24 November 1942, completed 28 April 1943, torpedoed and sunk 1944.
- HMS Boxer, tank landing craft for British Admiralty, launched 12 December 1942, completed 1 May 1943, scrapped 1958.
- SS Empire Nerissa, (Clyde-built), cargo ship for Ministry of War Transport, launched 23 December 1942, completed 23 February 1943.
- MV Empire Fay, (Clyde-built), oil tanker for Ministry of War Transport, launched 26 December 1942, completed 21 April 1943, renamed Kleinella 1946, Shellbrit 1948, BP Marketer 1952 and Sarroch 1964, scrapped September 1983.
- HMT Oxna, (Clyde-built), Isles-class trawler for the British Admiralty, launched 26 January 1943, completed 22 May 1943.
- MV Narica, oil tanker for Anglo Saxon Petroleum Co, launched 7 February 1943, completed 28 May 1943.
- MV British Patience, oil tanker for British tanker Co, launched 23 March 1943, completed 15 June 1943.
- MV Samanco, cargo ship for PSNC, launched 23 March 1943, completed 9 August 1943.
- MV Empire Coppice, (Clyde-built), oil tanker for Ministry of War Transport, launched 27 March 1943, completed 22 June 1943.
- MV Empire Industry, oil tanker for Ministry of War Transport, launched 4 May 1943, completed 16 September 1943.
- MV Empire Outpost, cargo ship for Ministry of War Transport, launched 31 May 1943, completed 31 July 1943, renamed Pilote Garnier 1945 and Kyra Hariklia 1960, scrapped 1966.
- MV Empire MacKay, (Govan-built), merchant aircraft carrier for British Admiralty, launched 17 June 1943, completed 5 October 1943, renamed British Swordfish 1946, scrapped 1959.
- MV Empire Traveller, oil tanker for Ministry of War Transport, launched 29 June 1943, completed 28 October 1943, renamed Pechelbronn 1946, Eagle 1956 and Jajce 1959, scrapped 1969.
- HMCS Ontario, Minotaur-class cruiser for British Admiralty, launched 29 July 1943, completed 25 May 1945, scrapped 1960.
- HMS Pickle, Algerine-class minesweeper for British Admiralty, launched 3 August 1943, completed 15 October 1943.
- HMS Meon, (Clyde-built), River-class frigate for British Admiralty, launched 4 August 1943, completed 31 December 1943, renamed HMCS Meon 1944, scrapped 1966.
- MV Sarmiento, cargo ship for PSNC, launched 17 August 1943, completed 28 October 1943.
- HMS Pincher, Algerine-class minesweeper for British Admiralty, launched 19 August 1943, completed 12 November 1943.
- MV Neritina, oil tanker for Anglo Saxon Petroleum Co, launched 31 August 1943, completed 3 December 1943.
- MV Waiwera, refrigerated cargo ship for Shaw Savill Line, launched 20 September 1943, completed 29 October 1944.
- HMS Helmsdale, (Clyde-built), River-class frigate for British Admiralty, launched 5 June 1943, completed 15 October 1943, scrapped 1957.
- HMCS Long Branch, (Clyde-built), Flower-class corvette for Royal Canadian Navy, launched 28 September 1943, completed 15 January 1944, renamed Rexton Kent II 1947 and Rexton Kent, scuttled 1966.
- HMS Plucky, Algerine-class minesweeper for British Admiralty, launched 29 September 1943, completed 10 December 1943.
- MV Norrisia, oil tanker for Anglo Saxon Petroleum Co, launched 14 October 1943, completed 3 March 1944.
- HMS Recruit, Algerine-class minesweeper for British Admiralty, launched 26 October 1943, completed 14 January 1944.
- MV San Vito, oil tanker for Eagle Oil Co, launched 2 November 1943, completed 30 December 1943.
- MV Empire Harvest, (Clyde-built), oil tanker for Ministry of War Transport, launched 10 November 1943, completed 30 December 1943, renamed Shellbrit 5 1946 and BP Engineer in 1952, scrapped June 1965.
- MV Nassarius, oil tanker for Anglo Saxon Petroleum Co, launched 14 November 1943, completed 30 March 1944.
- HMS Rifleman, Algerine-class minesweeper for British Admiralty, launched 25 November 1943, completed 11 February 1944, scrapped 1972.
- HMS Glory, Colossus-class aircraft carrier for British Admiralty, launched 27 November 1943, completed 2 April 1945, scrapped 1961.
- HMS Oxford Castle, Castle-class corvette for British Admiralty, launched 11 December 1943, completed 10 March 1944, scrapped 1960.
- MV Drina, refrigerated cargo ship for Royal Mail Line, launched 30 December 1943, completed 25 July 1944.
- HMS Pevensey Castle, Castle-class corvette for British Admiralty, launched 11 January 1944, completed 10 June 1944, renamed Weather Monitor 1962 and Admiral Beaufort 1976, scrapped 1982.
- MV Parina, cargo ship for Royal Mail Line, launched 20 January 1944, completed 8 July 1944.
- MV Empire Rangoon, cargo ship for Ministry of War Transport, launched 25 January 1944, completed 30 May 1944, renamed Homer City 1947, Grosvenor Mariner 1966 and Red Sea 1966, scrapped 1971.
- HMS Halladale, (Clyde-built), River-class frigate for British Admiralty, launched 28 January 1944, completed 11 May 1944, renamed Halladale 1949, Norden 1962 and Turist Expressen 1962.
- MV Paraguay, cargo ship for Royal Mail Line, launched 8 February 1944, completed 7 September 1944.
- HMS Rising Castle, Castle-class corvette for British Admiralty, launched 8 February 1944, completed 26 June 1944 as HMCS Arnprior, renamed Montevideo 1946.
- HMS Sherborne Castle, Castle-class corvette for British Admiralty, launched 24 February 1944, completed 14 July 1944, renamed HMCS Petrolia 1944.
- MV Richmond Castle, refrigerated cargo ship for Union Castle, launched 23 March 1944, completed 28 September 1944.
- RFA Wave King, (Govan-built), oil tanker for British Admiralty, launched 6 April 1944, completed 22 July 1944, scrapped 1960.
- MV Devis, cargo ship for Lamport & Holt, launched 12 April 1944, completed 20 August 1944.
- HMS Humberstone, Castle-class corvette for British Admiralty, launched 12 April 1944, completed 20 September 1944 as HMCS Humberstone.
- HMS Squirrel, Algerine-class minesweeper for British Admiralty, launched 20 April 1944, completed 16 August 1944, mined and scuttled 24 July 1945.
- HMS Chameleon, Algerine-class minesweeper for British Admiralty, launched 6 May 1944, completed 14 September 1944.
- MV Empire Saturn, oil tanker for Ministry of War Transport, launched 6 May 1944, completed 20 September 1944, renamed Nayadis 1946, scrapped 1961.
- MV Empire Dombey, (Clyde-built), oil tanker for Ministry of War Transport, launched 15 May 1944, completed 26 June 1944, renamed Allurity 1947, scrapped 1966.
- SS Empire Gambia, (Clyde-built), cargo ship for Ministry of War Transport, launched 19 May 1944, completed 10 July 1945, renamed King Edgar 1946, scrapped 1959.
- HMS Warrior, Colossus-class aircraft carrier for British Admiralty, launched 20 May 1944, completed 14 March 1946, renamed HMCS Warrior 1946 and ARA Independencia 1958, scrapped 1971.
- HMS Cheerful, Algerine-class minesweeper for British Admiralty, launched 22 May 1944, completed 13 October 1944.
- HMS Loch Craggie, Loch-class frigate for British Admiralty, launched 23 May 1944, completed 15 June 1944, scrapped 1963.
- HMS Loch Gorm, Loch-class frigate for British Admiralty, launched 8 June 1944, completed 7 July 1944, renamed Orion 1961.
- HMS Hare, Algerine-class minesweeper for British Admiralty, launched 20 June 1944, completed 10 November 1944, renamed HMNS Nigeria 1959.
- HMS Loch Killisport, Loch-class frigate for British Admiralty, launched 6 July 1944, completed 9 September 1945, scrapped 1970.
- RFA Wave Monarch, oil tanker for British Admiralty, launched 6 July 1944, completed 3 November 1944.
- HMS Jewel, Algerine-class minesweeper for British Admiralty, launched 20 July 1944, completed 9 December 1944.
- HMS Oakham Castle, (Clyde-built), Castle-class corvette for British Admiralty, launched 20 July 1944, completed 10 December 1944, renamed Weather Reporter 1957.
- HMS Loch Ard, Loch-class frigate for British Admiralty, launched 2 August 1944, completed 2 January 1945 as HMSAS Transvaal for South African Navy, scuttled 1978.
- MV Niso, oil tanker for Anglo Saxon Petroleum Co, launched 3 August 1944, completed 20 December 1944.
- HMS Liberty, Algerine-class minesweeper for British Admiralty, launched 22 August 1944, completed 18 January 1945.
- MV Empire Jura, (Clyde-built), oil tanker for Ministry of War Transport, launched 28 August 1944, completed 16 October 1944, renamed Samshoo 1946, Pass of Glenogle 1951, Marcello Garolla 1961 and Marcello G 1969, scrapped 1979.
- MV Empire Falkland, cargo ship for Ministry of War Transport, launched 2 September 1944, completed 21 February 1945, maiden voyage 25 February 1945, renamed Stirlingshire 1946, scrapped 1966.
- HMS LST 3006, landing ship, tank for British Admiralty, launched 3 September 1944, completed 15 September 1944.
- MV Durango, refrigerated cargo ship for Royal Mail Line, launched 5 September 1944, completed 20 December 1944.
- HMS LST 3007, landing ship, tank for British Admiralty, launched 16 September 1944, completed 28 September 1944.
- MV Empire Jupiter, (Govan-built), oil tanker for Ministry of War Transport, launched 21 September 1944, completed 29 December 1944, renamed Saint Gaudens 1946, Sevane 1948 and Progres 1958, scrapped in 1970.
- HMS LST 3010, landing ship, tank for British Admiralty, launched 30 September 1944, completed 5 April 1945.
- MV Empire Bute, (Clyde-built), oil tanker for Ministry of War Transport, launched 19 October 1944, completed 22 December 1944, renamed Miliana 1946, Rivoli 1948, Pass of Drumochter 1952 and Santa Giulia 1962, scrapped 1971.
- HMS Widemouth Bay, Bay-class frigate for British Admiralty, launched 19 October 1944, completed 13 April 1945, scrapped 1957.
- HMS LST 3008, landing ship, tank for British Admiralty, launched 31 October 1944, completed 4 May 1945.
- HMS LST 3041, landing ship, tank for British Admiralty, launched 31 October 1944, completed 6 June 1945.
- MV Roxburgh Castle, refrigerated cargo ship for Union Castle, launched 31 October 1944, completed 14 February 1945.
- HMS Magnificent, Majestic-class aircraft carrier for British Admiralty, launched 16 November 1944, completed 21 May 1948 and delivered as HMCS Magnificent, scrapped 1965.
- MV Newcombia, oil tanker for Anglo Saxon petroleum Co, launched 17 November 1944, completed 22 March 1945.
- HMS St Austell Bay, Bay-class frigate for British Admiralty, launched 18 November 1944, completed 29 May 1945, scrapped 1959.
- HMS Whitesand Bay, Bay-class frigate for British Admiralty, launched 16 December 1944, completed 30 July 1945, scrapped 1956.
- SS Empire Orkney, (Clyde-built), oil tanker for Ministry of War Transport, launched 30 November 1944, completed 26 February 1945, renamed Alchymist 1950, scrapped 1969.
- MV Empire Abercorn, refrigerated cargo ship for Ministry of War Transport, launched 30 December 1944, completed 30 June 1945, renamed Rakaia 1946, scrapped 1971.
- HMS LST 3009, landing ship, tank for British Admiralty, launched 30 December 1944, completed 11 May 1945.
- HMS St Brides Bay, Bay-class frigate for British Admiralty, launched 16 January 1945, completed 15 June 1945, scrapped 1962.
- SS Empire Shetland, (Clyde-built), oil tanker for Ministry of War Transport, launched 19 January 1945, completed 11 April 1945, renamed Adib 1948 and BP Transporter 1952, scrapped 1965.
- HMS LST 3042, landing ship, tank for British Admiralty, launched 31 January 1945, completed 16 November 1945.
- HMS LST 3011, landing ship, tank for British Admiralty, launched 12 February 1945, completed 14 August 1945.
- HMS Start Bay, Bay-class frigate for British Admiralty, launched 15 February 1945, completed 6 September 1945, scrapped 1958.
- HMS Powerful, Majestic-class aircraft carrier for British Admiralty, launched 27 February 1945, completed 21 January 1957 as HMCS Bonaventure, scrapped 1971.
- MV Defoe, cargo ship for Lamport & Holt, launched 28 February 1945, completed 31 May 1945.
- HMS LST 3012, landing ship, tank for British Admiralty, launched 12 March 1945, completed 25 September 1945.
- MV Empire Belgrave, (Clyde-built), oil tanker for Ministry of War Transport, launched 16 March 1945, completed 19 June 1945, renamed Aqueity 1947, sunk by mine 1947.
- MV British Might, oil tanker for British Tanker Co, launched 29 March 1945, completed 7 June 1945.
- HMS Tremadoc Bay, Bay-class frigate for British Admiralty, launched 29 March 1945, completed 11 October 1945, scrapped 1959.
- HMS LST 3013, landing ship, tank for British Admiralty, launched 24 April 1945, completed 24 November 1945.
- HMS Wigtown Bay, Bay-class frigate for British Admiralty, launched 26 April 1945, completed 19 January 1946, scrapped 1959.
- MV Empire Clarendon, refrigerated cargo ship for Ministry of War Transport, launched 14 May 1945, completed 26 October 1945, renamed Tuscan Star 1947, Timaru Star 1948 and California Star 1959, scrapped 1969.
- MV British Supremacy, oil tanker for British Tanker Co, launched 26 July 1945, completed 21 December 1945.
- MV Empire Tesland, (Clyde-built), oil tanker for Ministry of War Transport, launched 31 July 1945, completed 19 September 1945, renamed Fulgar 1946, Shelbrit 9 1948 and BP Manager 1952, scrapped 1967.
- MV Pilcomayo, cargo ship for Royal Mail Line, launched 21 August 1945, completed 14 December 1945.
- HMS Hercules, aircraft carrier for British Admiralty, launched 22 September 1945 by Vickers-Armstrongs, completed 1957 by Harland and Wolff and delivered as INS Vikrant 1961, scrapped 2014
- MV Riebeeck Castle, refrigerated cargo ship for Union Castle, launched 23 October 1945, completed 11 March 1946.
- MV Neothyris, oil tanker for Anglo Saxon Petroleum Co, completed 24 January 1946.
- MV Port Hobart, refrigerated cargo ship for Port Line, launched 5 December 1945, completed 29 August 1946.
- MV British Piper, oil tanker for British Tanker Co, launched 20 December 1945, completed 11 April 1946.
- MV Santander, cargo ship for PSNC, launched 17 January 1946, completed 2 May 1946.
- MV Rustenburg Castle, refrigerated cargo ship for Union Castle, launched 5 March 1946, completed 25 June 1946.
- MV Empire Campden, (Clyde-built), oil tanker for Ministry of War Transport, launched 30 April 1945, completed 14 August 1945, renamed Anonity 1947, Petrola II 1966 and Kalymnos 1969, scrapped 1970.
- MV Empire Fitzroy, (Clyde-built), oil tanker for Ministry of War Transport, launched 12 June 1945, completed 9 October 1945, renamed Alignity 1952, scrapped 1971.
- MV Empire Grosvenor, (Clyde-built), oil tanker for Ministry of War Transport, launched 14 August 1945, completed 27 November 1945, renamed Frenulina 1947, Anlok 1962, Permina VI 1962 and Bimoli 01 1974.
- MV Empire Tedship, oil tanker for Ministry of War Transport, launched 20 October 1945, completed 4 February 1946, renamed Fischeria 1947, Acuity 1951, Vittoriosa 1967 and Neptunia 1969, scrapped 1975.
- MV Empire Tedport, (Clyde-built), oil tanker for Ministry of War Transport, launched 30 November 1945, completed 12 March 1946, renamed Felipes 1947, Shelbrit 10 1948 and Shell Director 1952, scrapped 1966.
- MV Empire Tedmuir, (Clyde-built), oil tanker for Ministry of War Transport, launched 5 February 1946, completed 7 May 1946, renamed Fusinus 1947 and Aqueity 1949, scrapped 1965.
- MV Empire Mercia, cargo ship for Ministry of War Transport, launched 4 March 1946, completed 18 December 1946 as Empire Star for Blue Star Line, scrapped 1971.
- MV Lyria, oil tanker for Anglo Saxon Petroleum Co, launched 6 March 1946, completed 20 June 1946.
- HMS Eagle, Audacious-class aircraft carrier for British Admiralty, launched 19 March 1946, completed 31 October 1951, scrapped 1978.
- MV Empire Tedrita, (Clyde-built), oil tanker for Ministry of War Transport, launched April 1946, completed 6 September 1946, renamed Fusus 1947, Monaco 1964 and Hanna 1965, scrapped 1965.
- MV Salaverry, cargo ship for PSNC, launched 2 April 1946, completed 16 August 1946.
- MV Empire Edgehill, (Govan-built), oil tanker for British Admiralty, launched 4 April 1946, completed 27 August 1946 as |RFA Wave Chief, scrapped 1975.
- MV Linga, oil tanker for Anglo Saxon petroleum Co, launched 16 April 1946, completed 19 September 1946.
- MV British Knight, oil tanker for British Tanker Co, launched 12 June 1946, completed 25 September 1946.
- MV Patella, bitumen tanker for Anglo Saxon Petroleum Co, launched 28 June 1945, completed 17 December 1946.
- HMS TF40, Landing Ship, Tank Mk.3 for British Admiralty, launched 12 September 1945, completed 26 January 1946.
- MV Empire Tescombe, oil tanker for Ministry of War Teansport, launched 4 October 1945, completed 24 December 1945.
- MV Empire Tesella, (Clyde-built), oil tanker for Ministry of War Transport, launched 31 October 1945, completed 7 February 1946, renamed British Pluck 1951, scrapped 1954.
- SS Balaena, whale factory ship for United Whalers Ltd, launched 18 April 1946, completed 28 September 1946.
- ST Linswe, L-class tug for Ministry of Transport, launched 5 June 1946, completed 2 August 1946.
- ST Linwet, L-class tug for Ministry of Transport, launched 12 June 1946, completed 2 August 1946.
- ST Linno, L-class tug for Ministry of Transport, launched 4 July 1946, completed 2 August 1946.
- ST Linyon, L-class tug for Ministry of Transport, launched 4 July 1946, completed 2 August 1946.
- ST Limpya, L-class tug for Ministry of Transport, launched 17 August 1946, completed 18 September 1946.
- ST Linda, L-class tug for Ministry of Transport, launched 17 August 1946, completed 18 September 1946.
- MV Calchas, cargo ship for Blue Funnel Line, launched 27 August 1946, completed 17 January 1947.
- MV La Hague, cargo ship for French Line, launched 12 September 1946, completed 4 June 1947.
- SS Loch Garth, refrigerated cargo ship for Royal Mail Line, launched 24 September 1946, completed 29 May 1947.
- MV Lepton, oil tanker for Anglo Saxon Petroleum Co, launched 26 September 1946, completed 6 February 1947.
- PS Waverley, paddle steamer for London and North Eastern Railway, launched 2 October 1946, completed 5 June 1947.
- MV Lingula, oil tanker for Anglo Saxon Petroleum Co, launched 11 October 1946, completed 25 March 1947.
- MV Morbihan, cargo ship for French Line, launched 21 November 1946, completed 3 July 1947.
- SS Athenic, passenger ship for Shaw Savill Line, launched 26 November 1946, completed 16 July 1947, maiden voyage 1 August 1947.
- SS Loch Avon, refrigerated cargo ship for Royal Mail Line, launched 27 November 1946, completed 3 September 1947.f1
- MV La Heve, cargo ship for French Line, launched 20 February 1947, completed 17 September 1947.
- RMS Parthia, passenger ship for Cunard-White Star Line, launched 25 February 1947, completed 7 April 1948, maiden voyage 10 April 1948, renamed SS Remuera 1961 and SS Aramac 1965, scrapped 1970.
- MV Salinas, cargo ship for PSNC, launched 7 March 1947, completed 18 November 1947.
- MV Munster, ferry for Coast Lines, launched 25 March 1947, completed 17 January 1948.
- HMS Centaur (R06), Centaur-class aircraft carrier for British Admiralty, launched 22 April 1947, completed 1953, scrapped 1973.
- MV Soochow, ferry for The China Navigation Company, launched 23 April 1947, completed 18 December 1947.
- MV Leinster, ferry for Coast Lines, launched 20 May 1947, completed 25 March 1948.
- MV Kantara, cargo ship for Moss Hutchinson Line, launched 3 June 1947, completed 19 November 1947.
- MV Imperial Star, refrigerated cargo ship for Blue Star Line, launched 17 June 1947, completed 12 March 1948.
- MV Thorshavet, whale factory ship for A/S Thor Dahl Ltd, launched 19 June 1947, completed 9 October 1947.
- Pretoria Castle, passenger ship for Union Castle, launched 19 August 1947, completed 10 July 1948, renamed SS Oranje 1966.
- MV Salamanca, cargo ship for PSNC, launched 29 August 1947, completed 20 March 1948.
- MV Pelorus, pilot tender for Trinity House, launched 2 September 1947, completed 28 January 1948.
- MV Lotorium, oil tanker for Anglo Saxon Petroleum Co, launched 30 September 1947, completed 30 December 1947.
- MV Karnak, cargo ship for Moss Hutchinson Line, launched 2 October 1947, completed 30 January 1948.
- MV Melbourne Star, refrigerated cargo ship for Blue Star Line, launched 2 October 1947, completed 14 July 1948.
- Edinburgh Castle, passenger ship for Union Castle, launched 16 October 1947, completed 26 November 1948.
- MV Penlee, pilot boat for Trinity House, launched 30 October 1947, completed 7 April 1948.
- MV British Ranger, oil tanker for British Tanker Co, launched 11 December 1947, completed 3 June 1948.
- SS Granuaile, lightship tender for Commissioners of Irish Lights, launched 14 February 1948, completed 18 July 1948.
- MV British Security, oil tanker for British Tanker Co, launched 27 February 1948, completed 7 July 1948.
- MV Liparus, oil tanker for Anglo Saxon Petroleum Co, launched 11 March 1948, completed 7 September 1948.
- SS Soestdyk, cargo ship for Holland America Line, launched 11 March 1948, completed 14 October 1948.
- RMS Magdalena, passenger ship for Royal Mail Line, launched 11 May 1948, completed 18 February 1949, wrecked 25 April 1949 on maiden voyage.
- SS Ramore Head, cargo ship for Ulster Steamship Co, launched 25 May 1948, completed 26 August 1948.
- SS Setter 1, whale catcher for United Whalers Ltd, launched 26 May 1948, completed 20 October 1948.
- MV British Strength, oil tanker for British Tanker Co, launched 8 June 1948, completed 12 November 1948.
- SS Schiedyk, cargo ship for Holland America Line, launched 10 June 1948, completed 19 February 1949.
- HMS Bulwark, aircraft carrier for British Admiralty, launched 22 June 1948, completed 2 November 1953, scrapped 1984.
- MV Jalta, oil tanker for A/S Bulls Rederi, launched 6 July 1948, completed 17 September 1948.
- SS Setter 2, whale catcher for United Whalers Ltd, launched 6 July 1948, completed 8 November 1948.
- MV Hibernia, ferry for British Railways, launched 22 July 1948, completed 5 April 1949, maiden voyage 14 April 1949, renamed Express Apollon 1976, scrapped 1980.
- MV British Mariner, oil tanker for British Tanker Co, launched 16 September 1948, completed 29 December 1948.
- MV Cambria, ferry for British Railways, launched 21 September 1948, completed 17 May 1949, renamed Altaif 1976.
- SS Sabaramati, ferry for Bombay Steam Navigation Co, launched 19 October 1948, completed 20 August 1949.
- SS Saravasti, ferry for Bombay Steam Navigation Co, launched 19 October 1948, completed 20 June 1949.
- MV Antilochus, cargo ship for Blue Funnel Line, launched 2 November 1948, completed 3 May 1949.
- MV Borgny, oil tanker for Fred Olsen & Co, launched 4 November 1948, completed 31 March 1949.
- MV British Workman, oil tanker for British Tanker Co, launched 16 November 1948, completed 24 March 1949.
- SS Setter 3, whale catcher for United Whalers Ltd, launched 28 December 1948, completed 18 August 1949.
- MV Cazador, oil tanker for Estrella Maritima SA, launched 27 January 1949, completed 15 June 1949.
- MV Explorador, oil tanker for Estrella Maritima SA, launched 15 February 1949, completed 6 July 1949.
- SS Setter 4, whale catcher for United Whalers Ltd, launched 17 February 1949, completed 2 September 1949.
- MV Vestfoss, oil tanker for A/S Thor Thorsen, launched 17 March 1949, completed 27 June 1949.
- MV Amarna, cargo ship for Moss Hutchinson Line, launched 29 March 1949, completed 6 July 1949.
- SS Champavati, ferry for Bombay Steam Navigation Co, launched 29 March 1949, completed 20 October 1949.
- SS Rohidas, ferry for Bombay Steam Navigation Co, launched 30 March 1949, completed 20 October 1949.
- SS Helenus, cargo ship for Blue Funnel Line, launched 13 April 1949, completed 29 October 1949.
- SS Setter 5, whale catcher for United Whalers Ltd, launched 24 May 1949, completed 19 September 1949.
- MV Assiout, cargo ship for Moss Hutchinson Line, launched 31 May 1949, completed 12 October 1949.
- MV Vikingen, oil tanker for Panama City Tanker Co, launched 10 June 1949, completed 7 October 1949.
- SS Setter 6, whale catcher for United Whalers Ltd, launched 28 June 1949, completed 12 October 1949.
- SS Hector, cargo liner for Blue Funnel Line, launched 27 July 1949, completed 31 March 1950.
- SS Ernst Larsen, whale catcher for Union Whaling Co, launched 28 July 1949, completed 4 November 1949.
- MV British Captain, oil tanker for British Tanker Co, launched 11 August 1949, completed 25 November 1949.
- SS Natalia, whale catcher for Union Whaling Co, launched 16 August 1949, completed as Arnt Karlsen 9 November 1949.
- MV Bloemfontein Castle, passenger ship for Union Castle, launched 24 August 1949, completed 25 March 1950, maiden voyage 6 April 1950, renamed Patris 1959, Mediterranean Island 1979, Mediterranean Star 1981 and Terra 1988, scrapped 1989.
- MV Ternoy, oil tanker for A/S Truma, launched 22 September 1949, completed 27 January 1950.
- SS Africana 2, research trawler for South African Government, launched 10 October 1949, completed 27 January 1950.
- SS Runic, refrigerated cargo ship for Shaw Savill Line, launched 21 October 1949, completed 24 March 1950.
- MV Kurdistan, oil tanker for Commons Bros Ltd, launched 26 October 1949, completed 24 February 1950.
- MV British Commander, oil tanker for British Tanker Co, launched 21 November 1949, completed 23 February 1950.
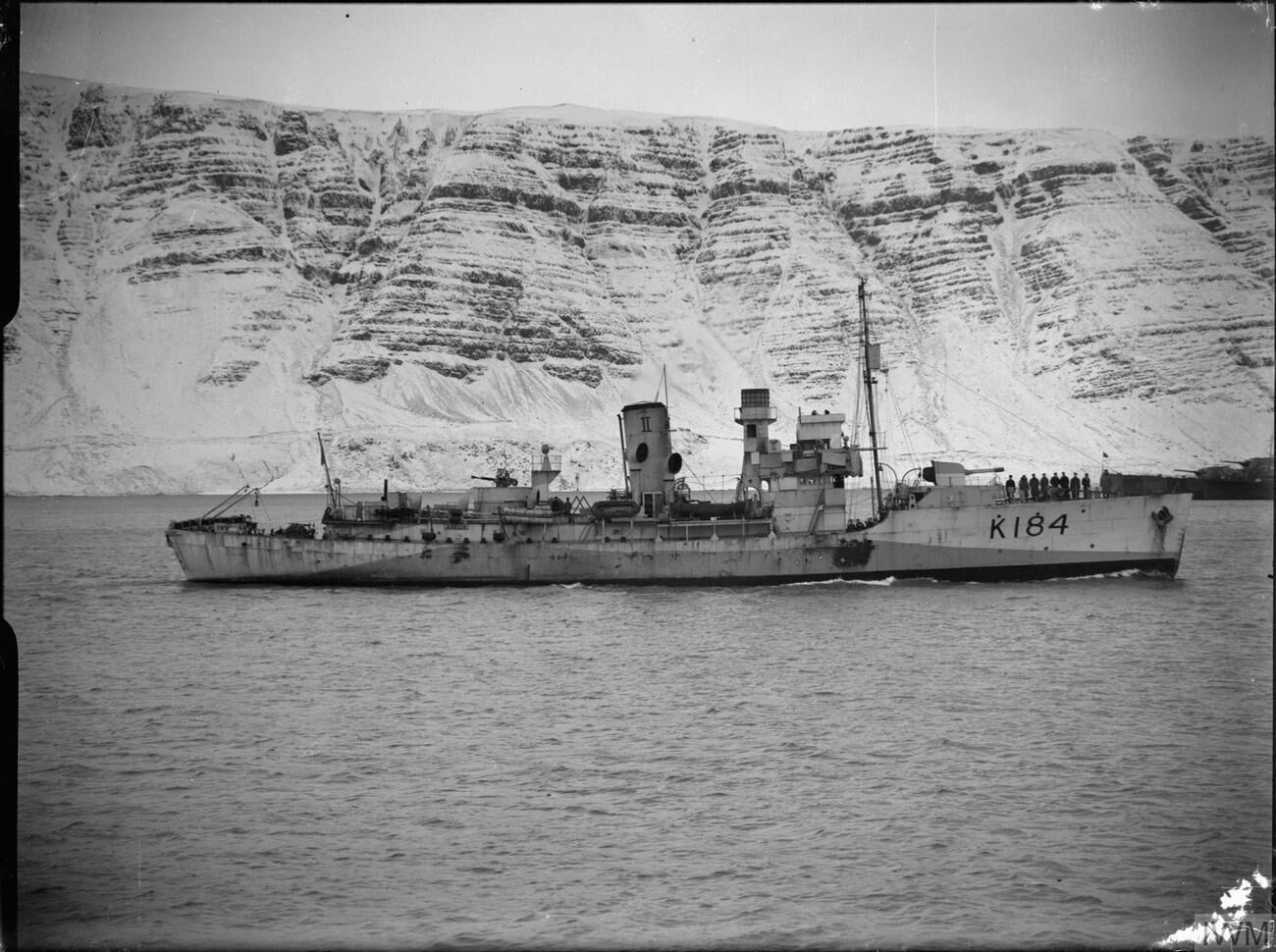
HMS Abelia

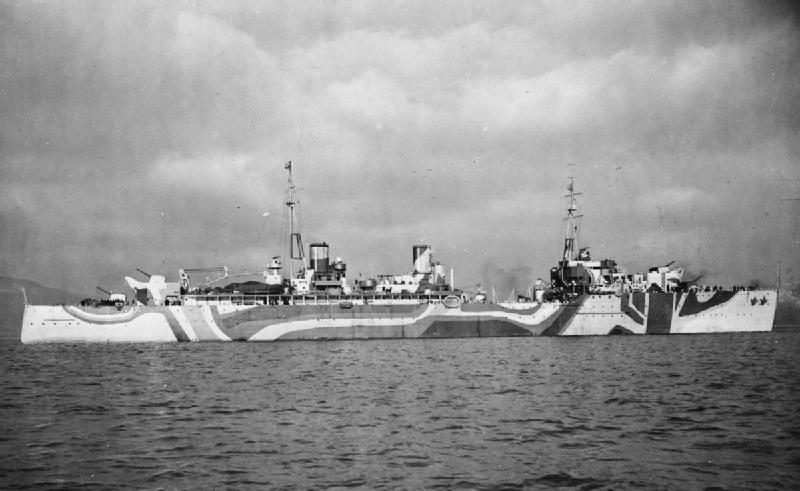
HMS Adamant

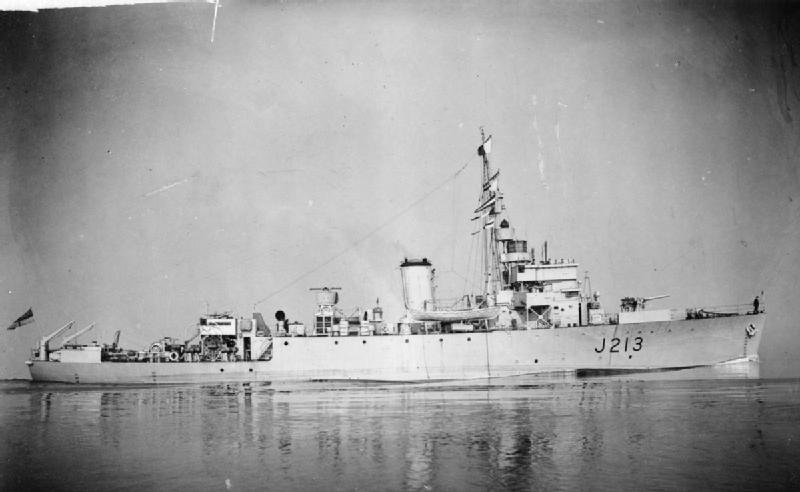
HMS Algerine

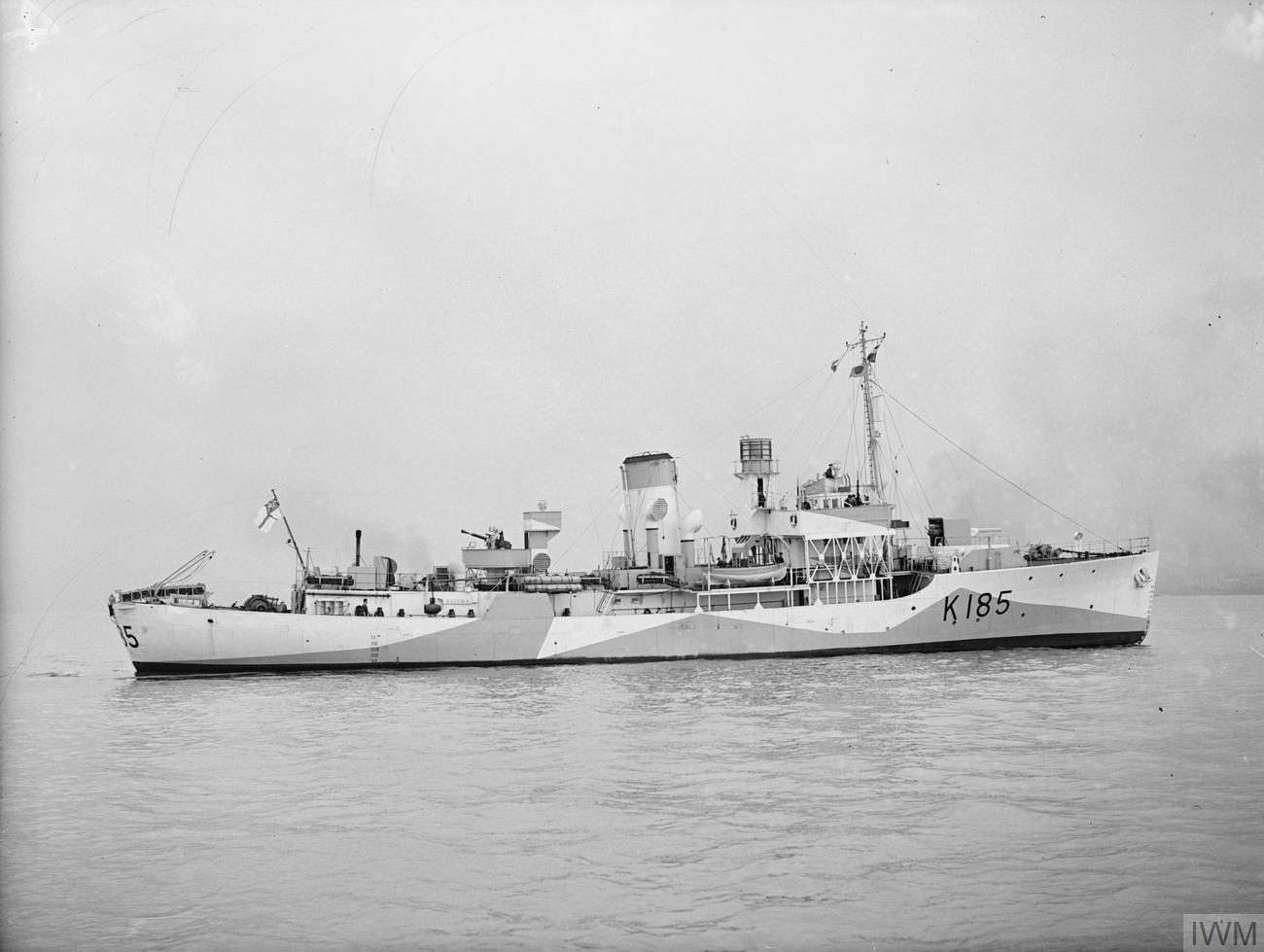
HMS Alisma

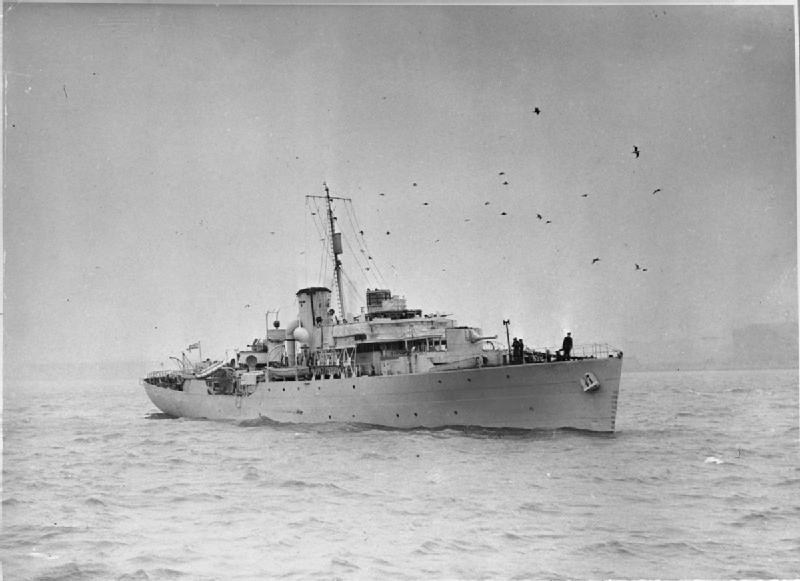
HMS Anchusa

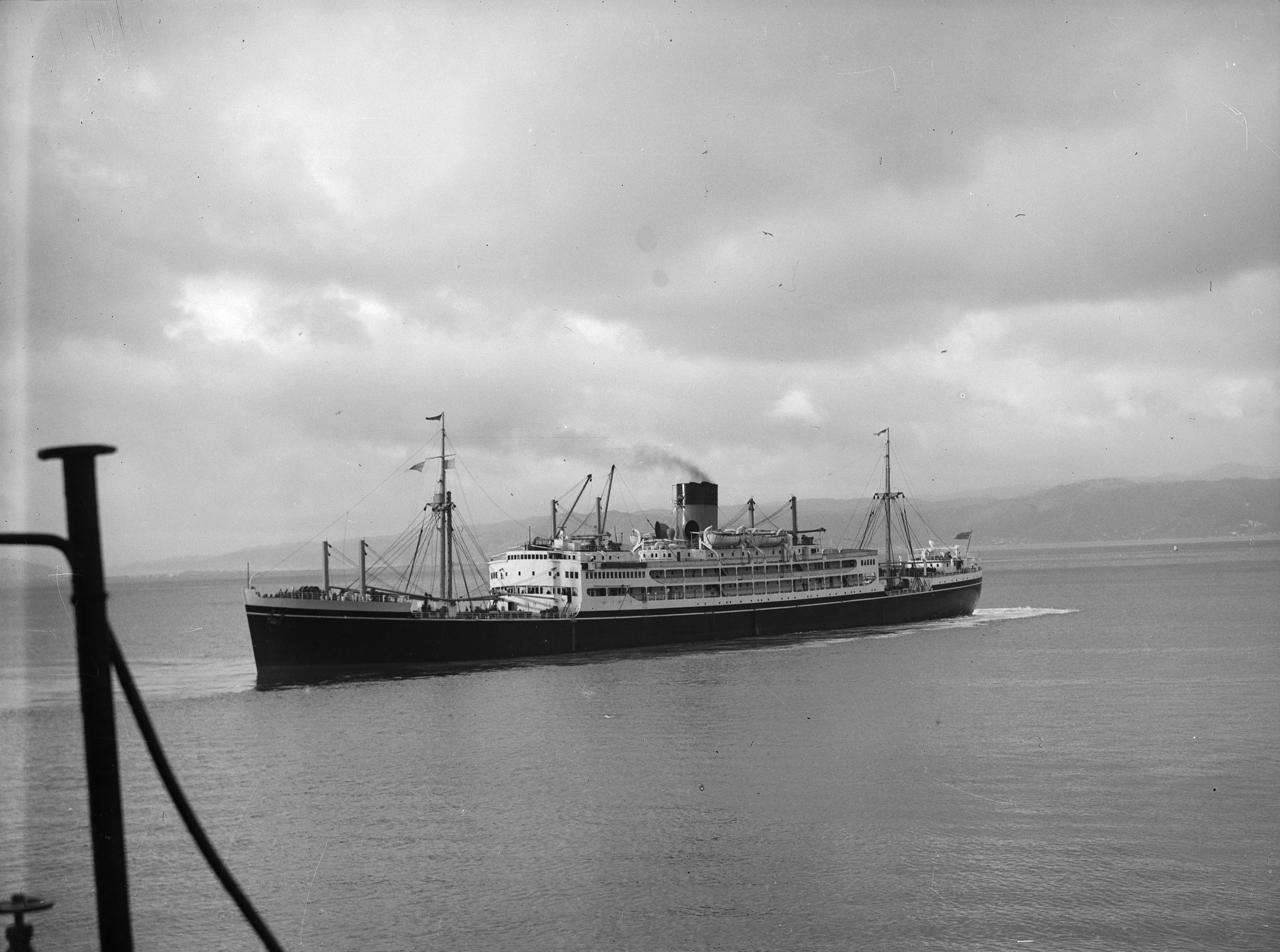
Athenic

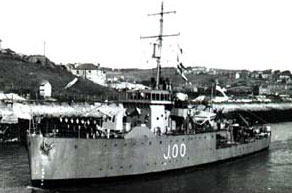
HMS Bangor

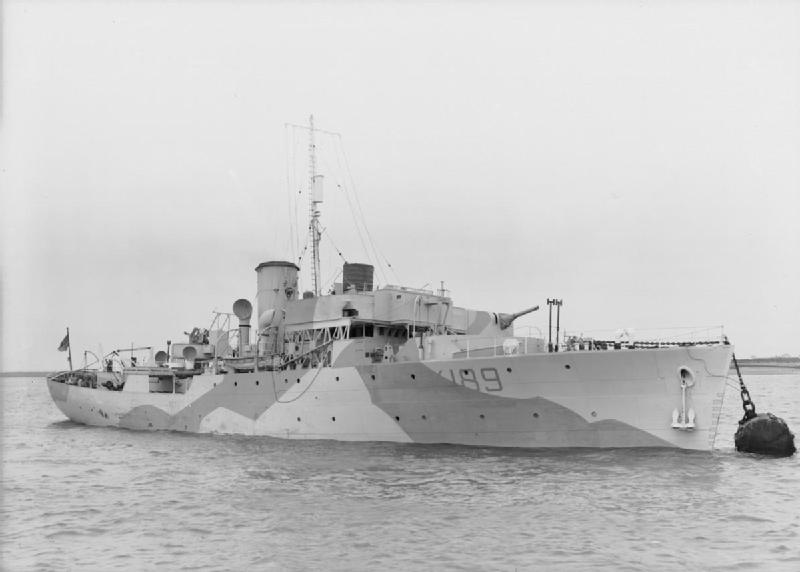
HMS Bergamot

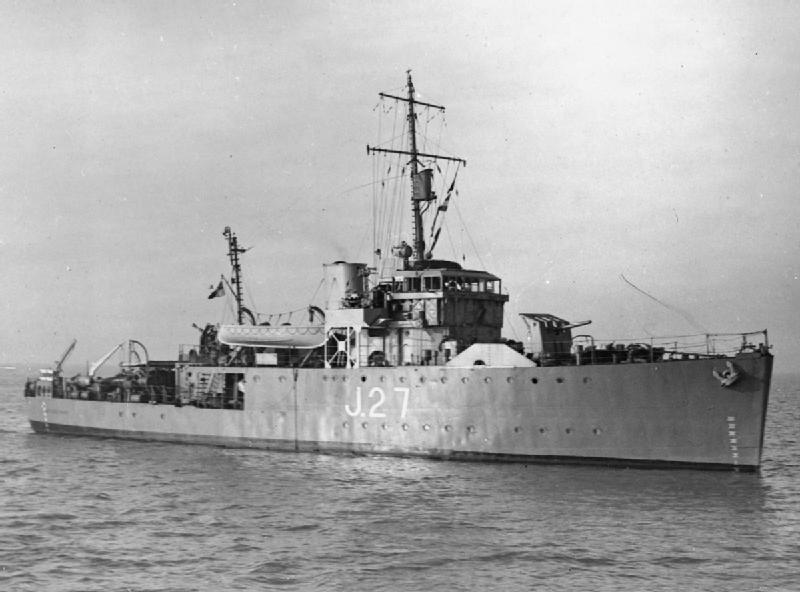
HMS Blackpool

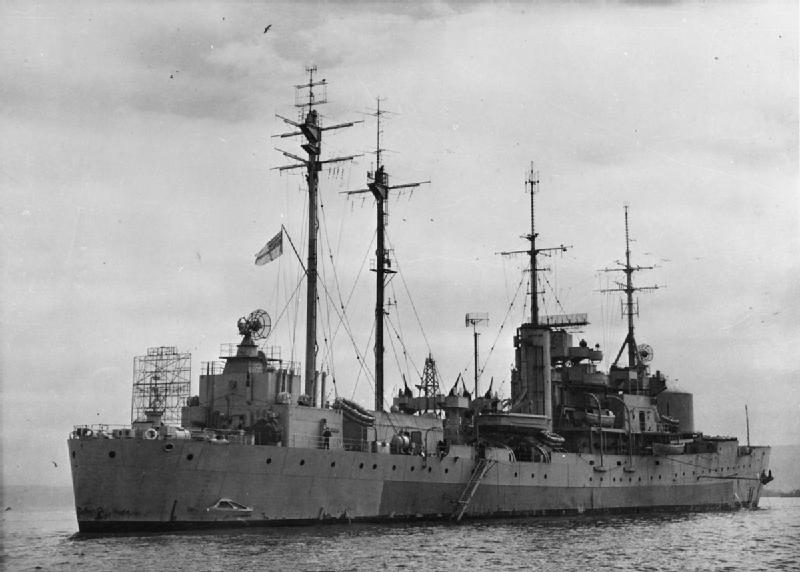
HMS Boxer

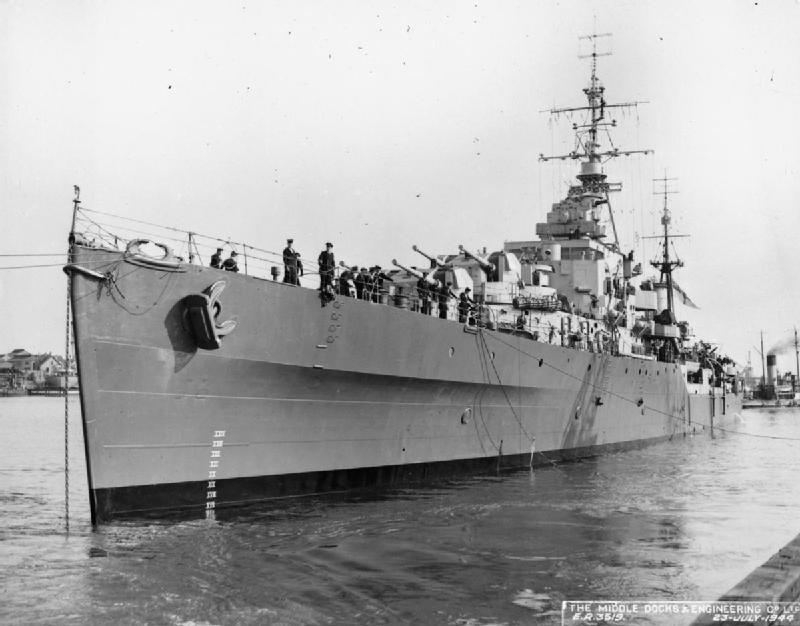
HMS Black Prince

RFA Black Ranger

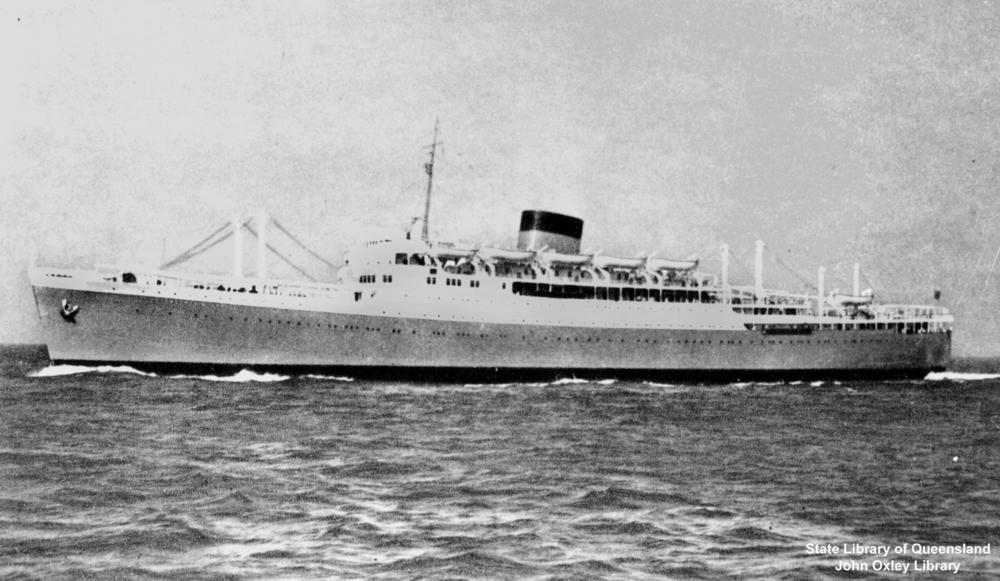
Bloemfontein Castle

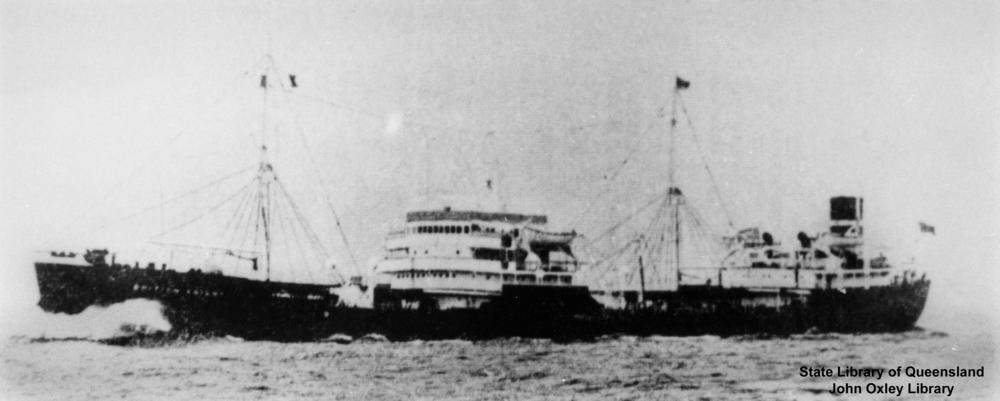
British Knight

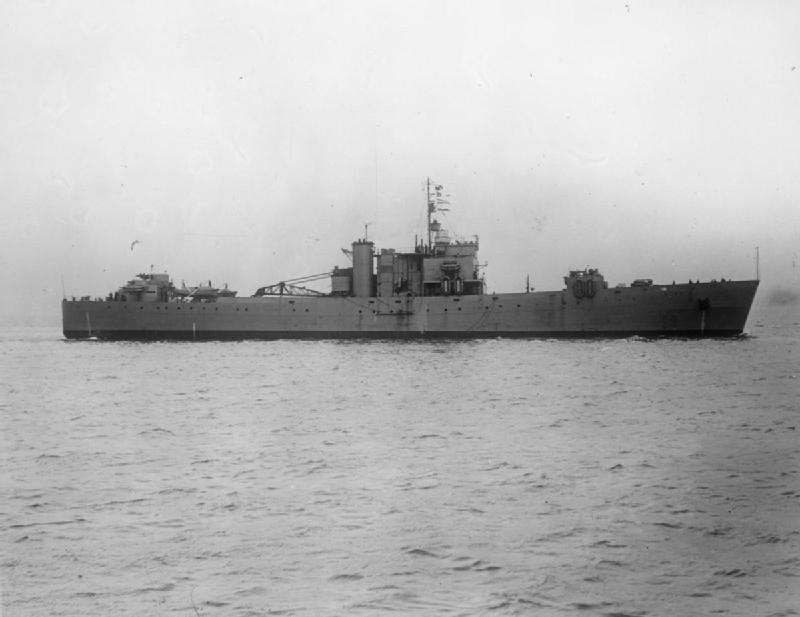
HMS Bruiser

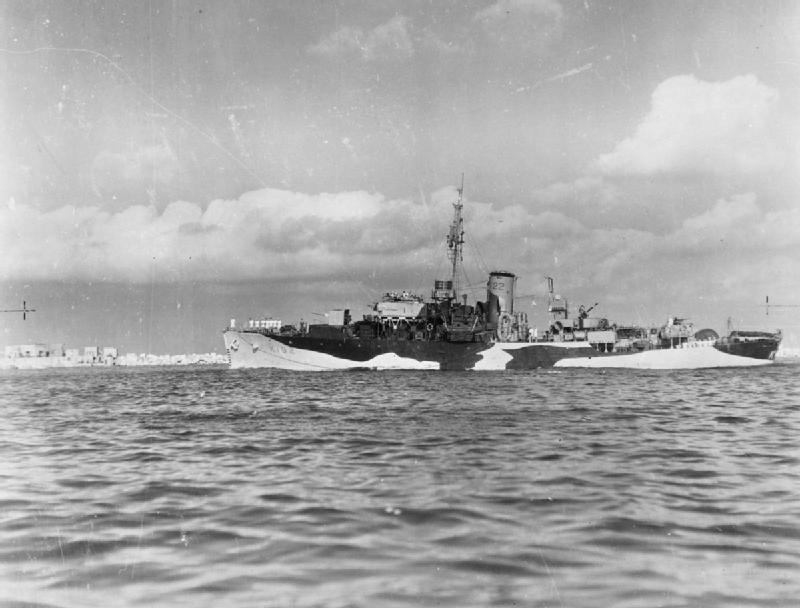
HMS Bryony

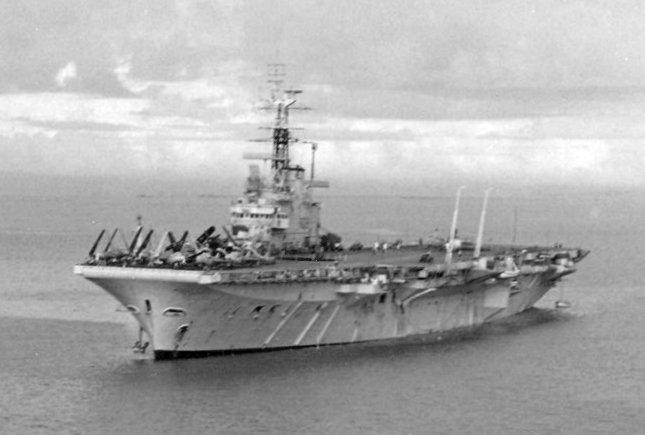
HMS Bulwark

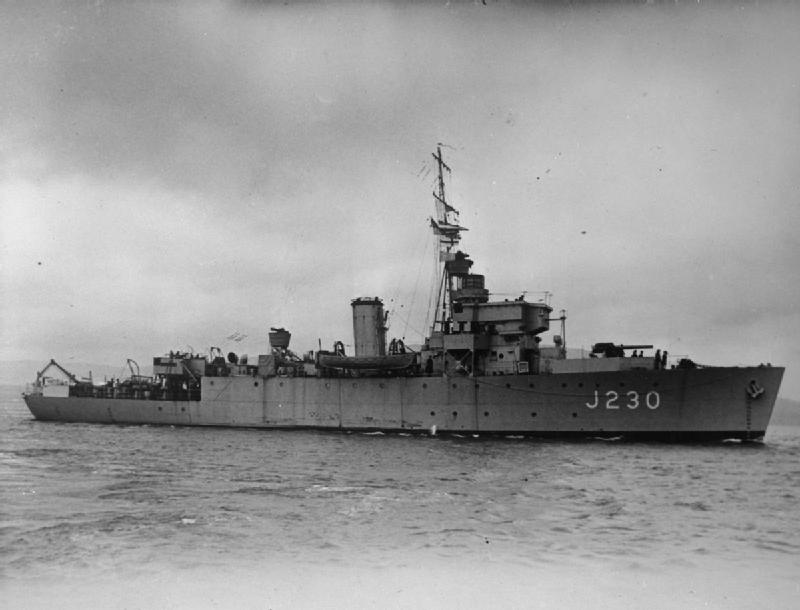
HMS Cadmus

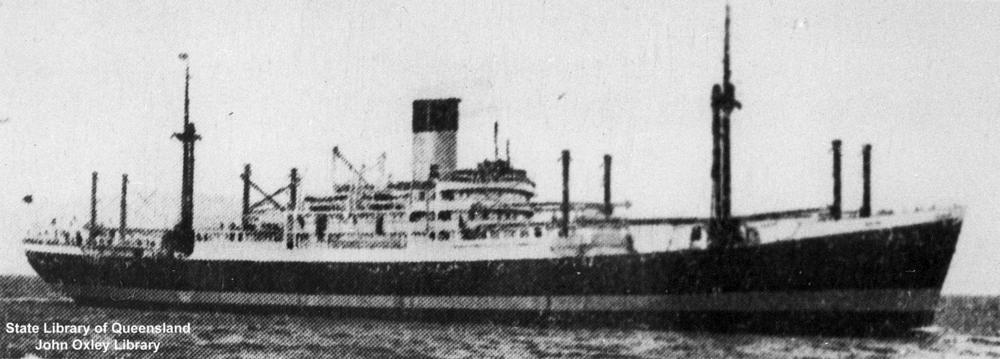
Calchas

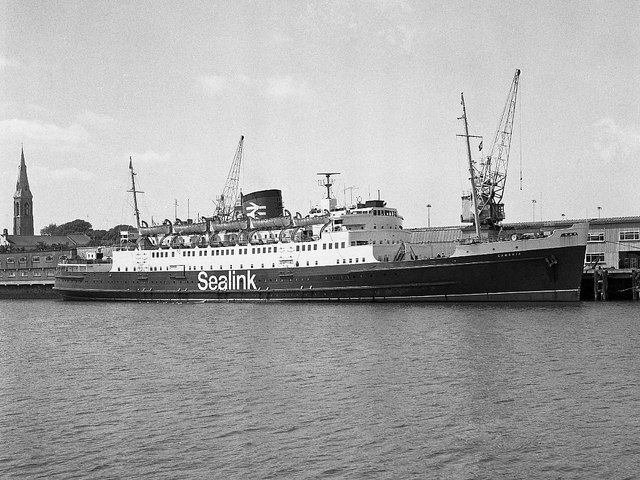
Cambria

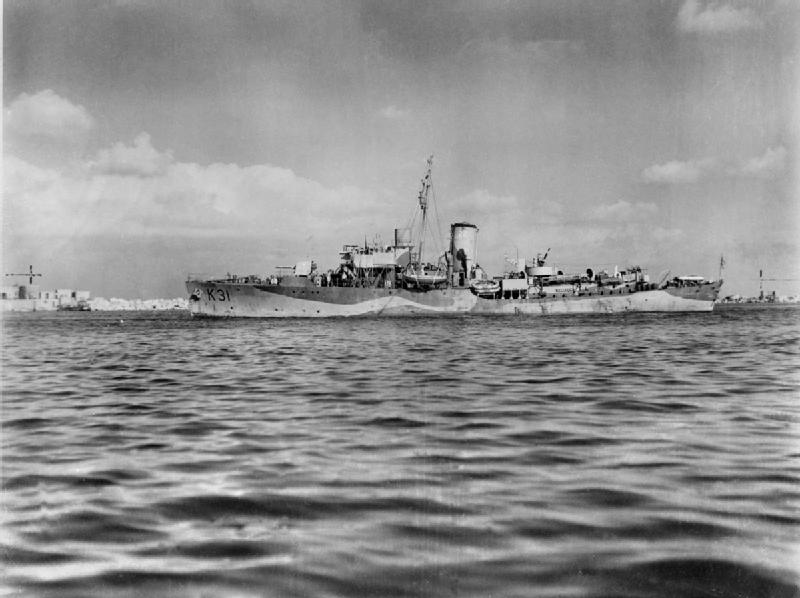
HMS Camellia

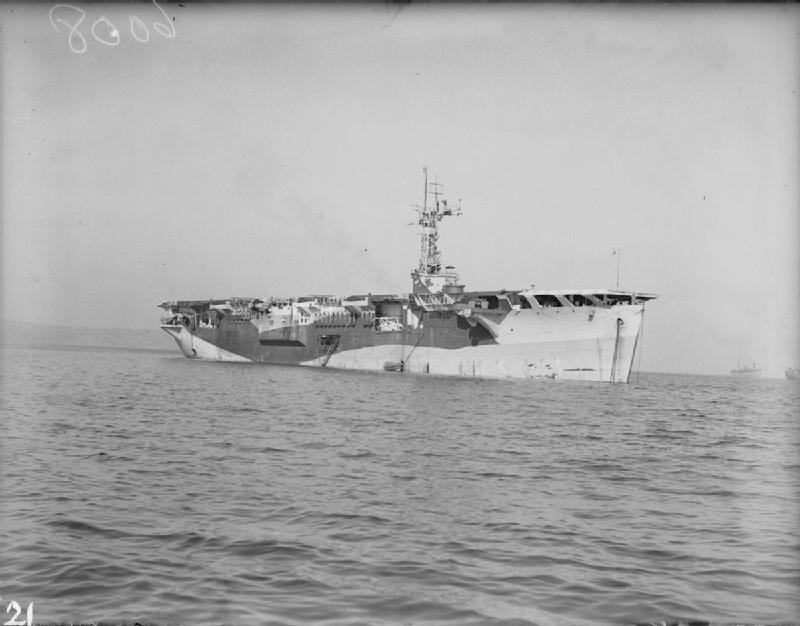
HMS Campania

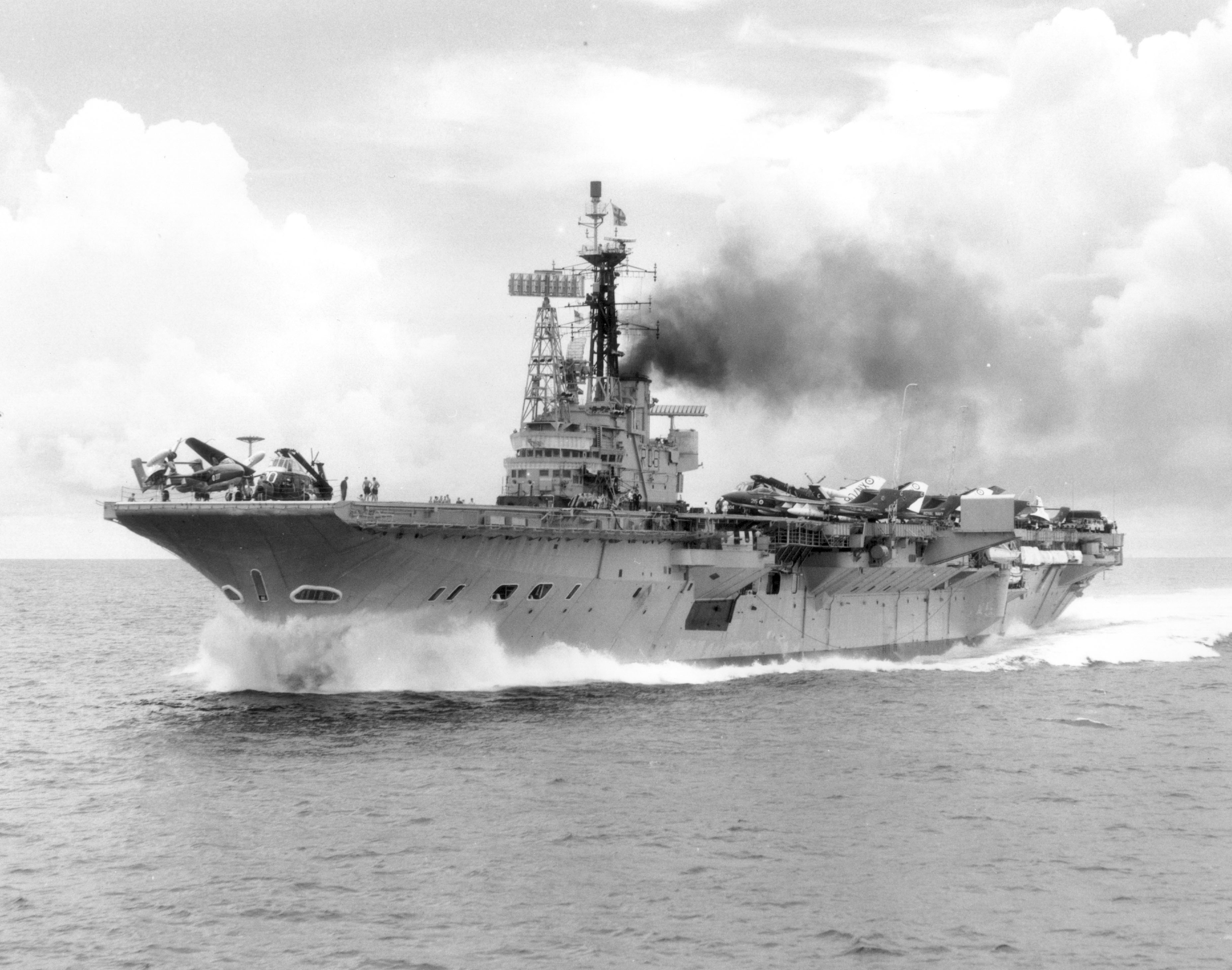
HMS Centaur

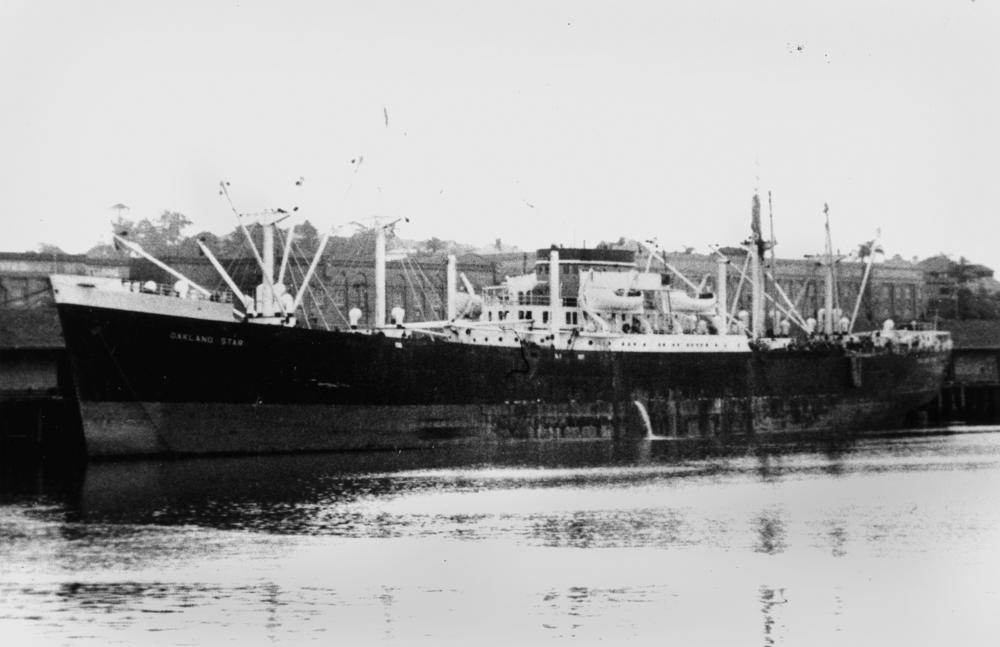
Oakland Star (launched as Devis)

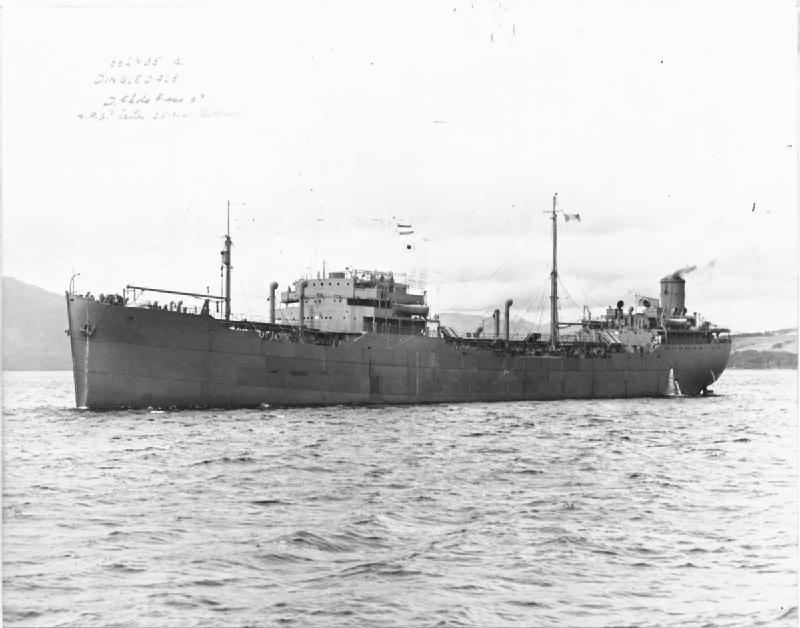
RFA Dingledale

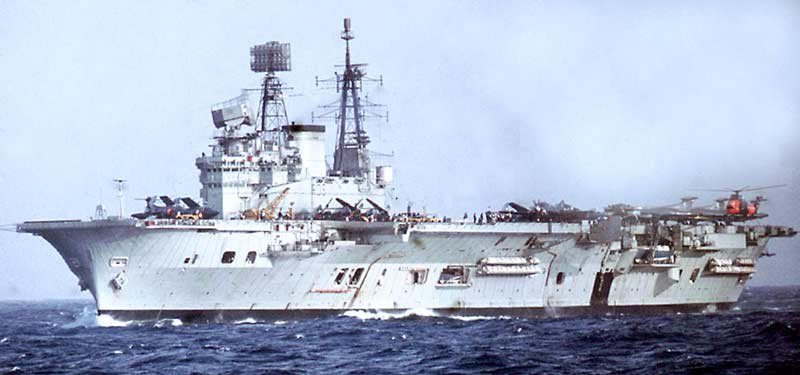
HMS Eagle

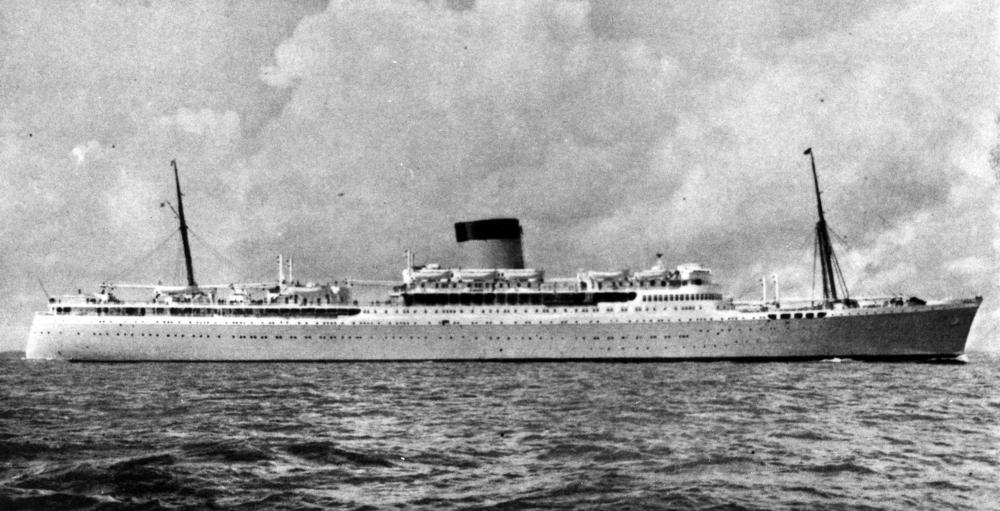
Edinburgh Castle

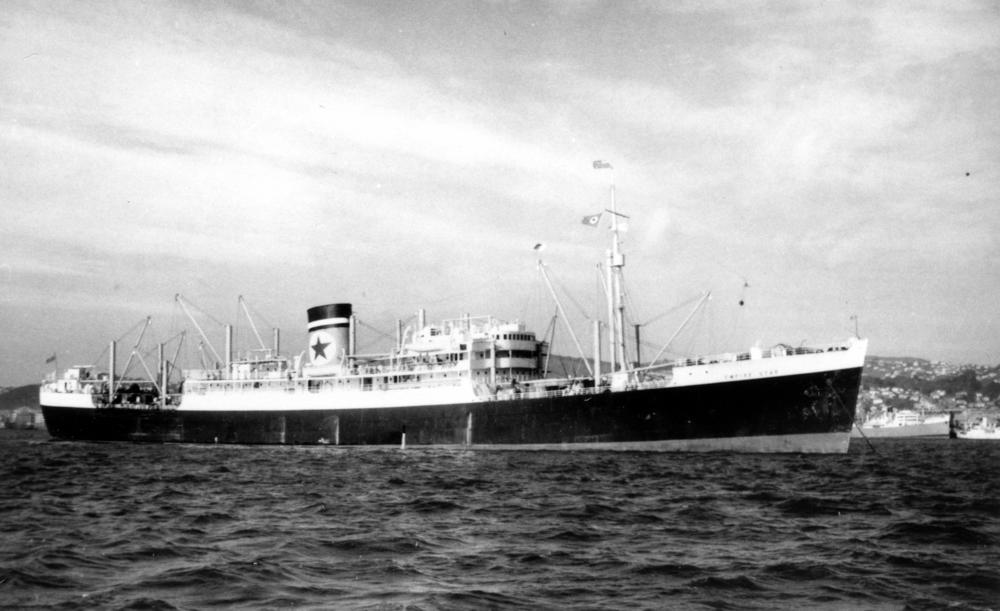
Empire Star

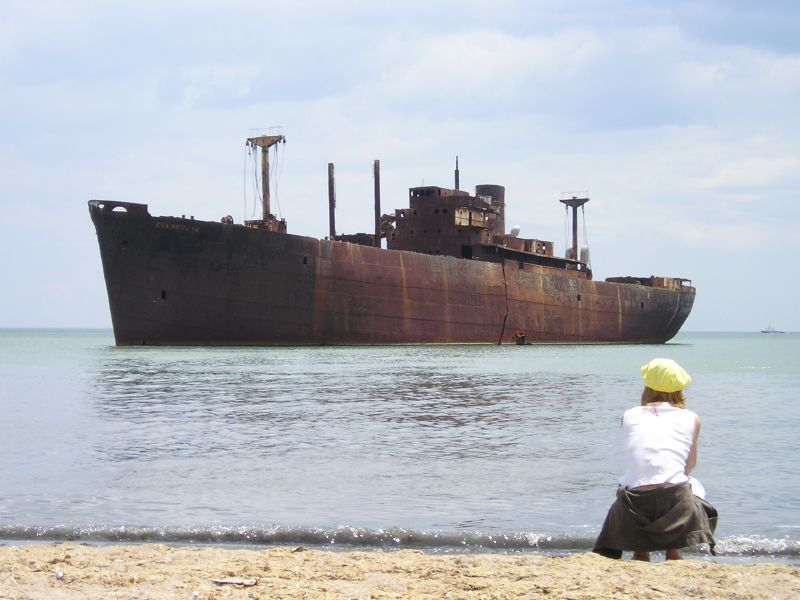
E. Evangelia (launched as Empire Strength)

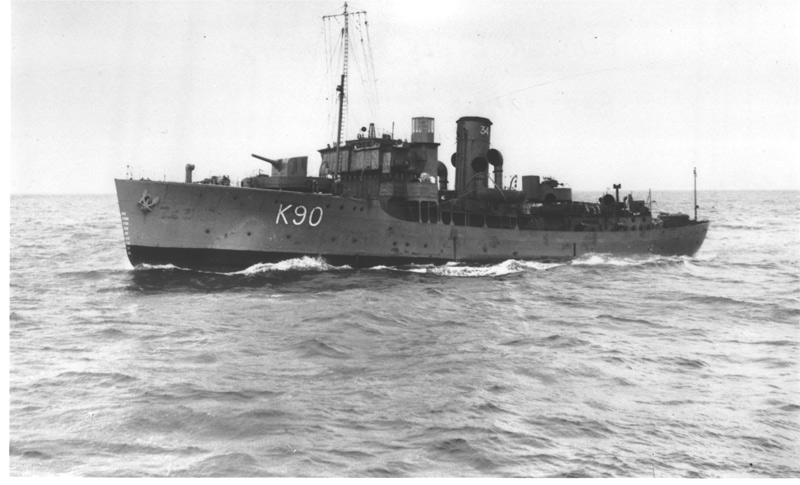
HMS Gentian

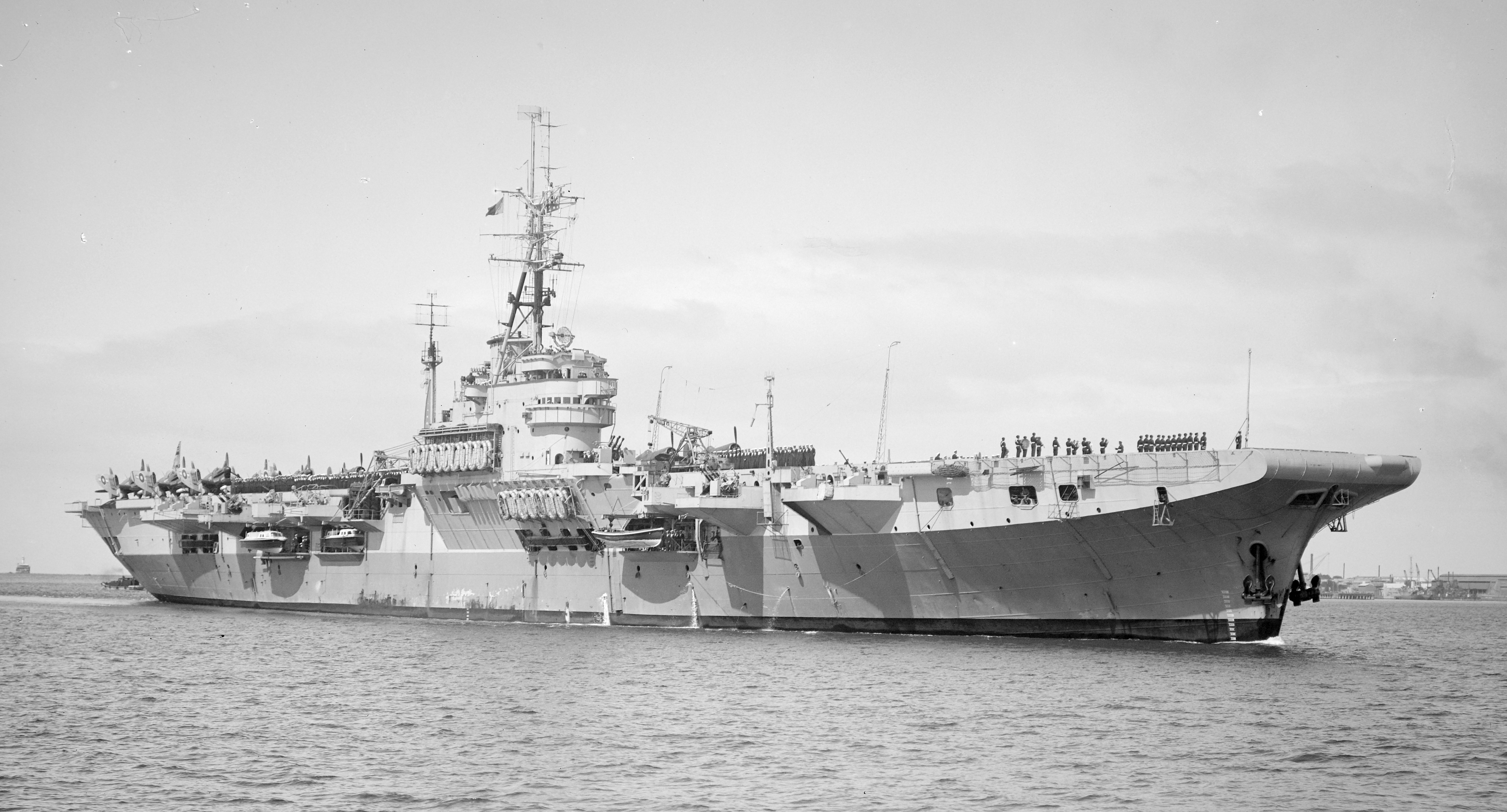
HMS Glory

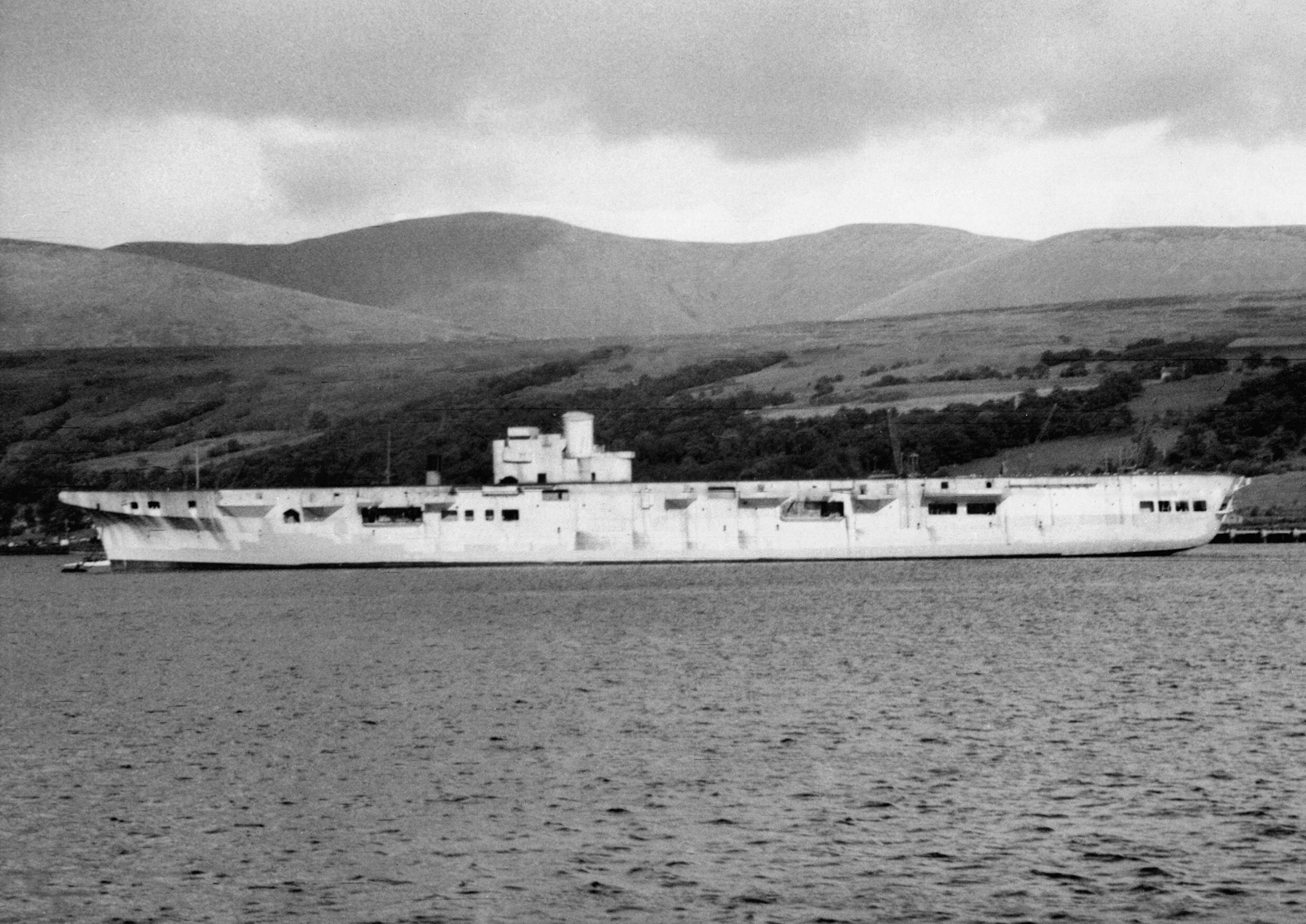
HMS Hercules

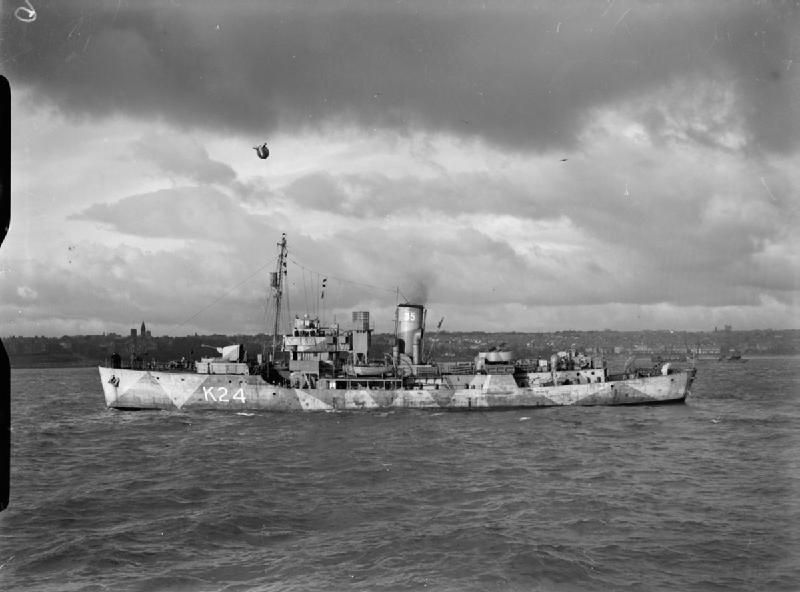
HMS Hibiscus

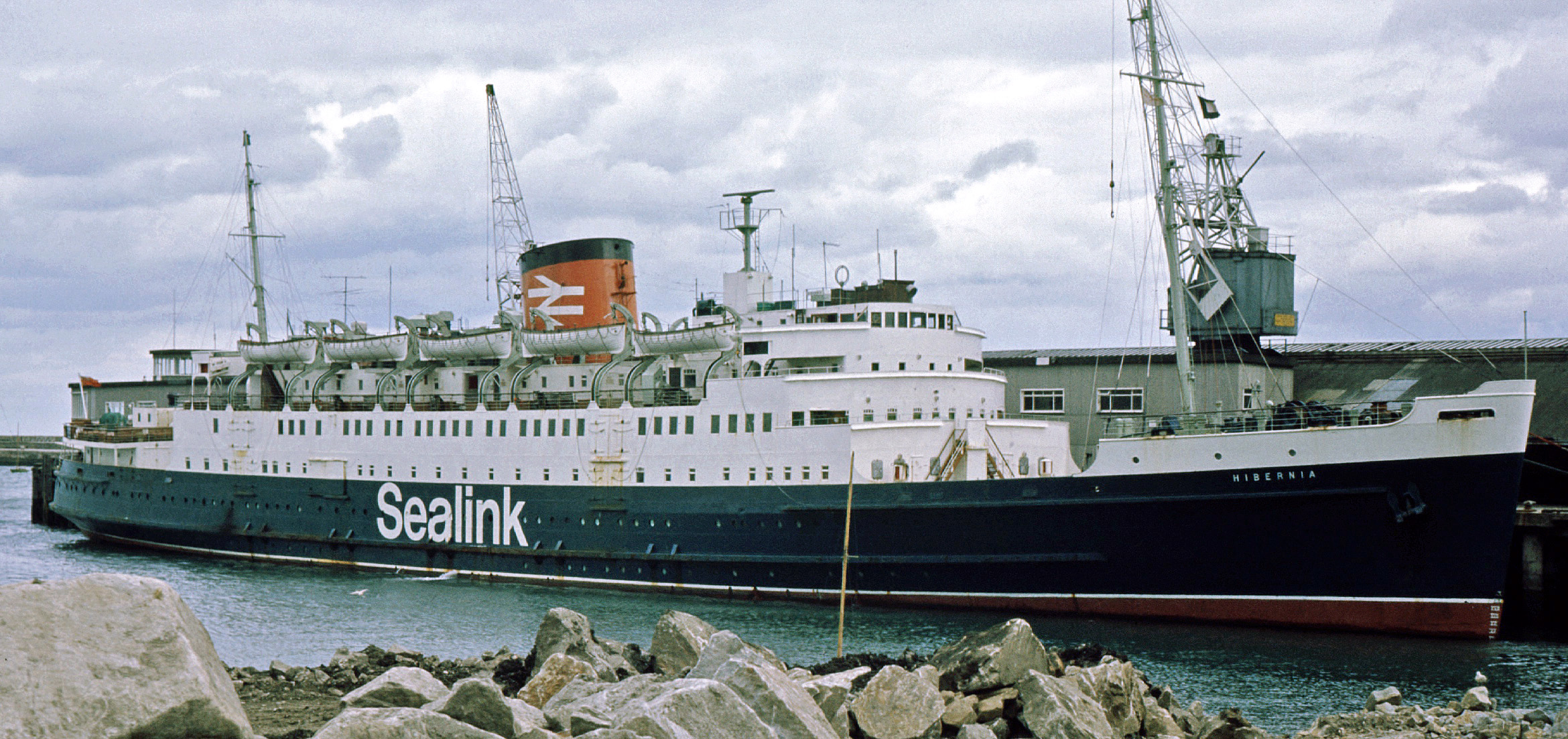
Hibernia

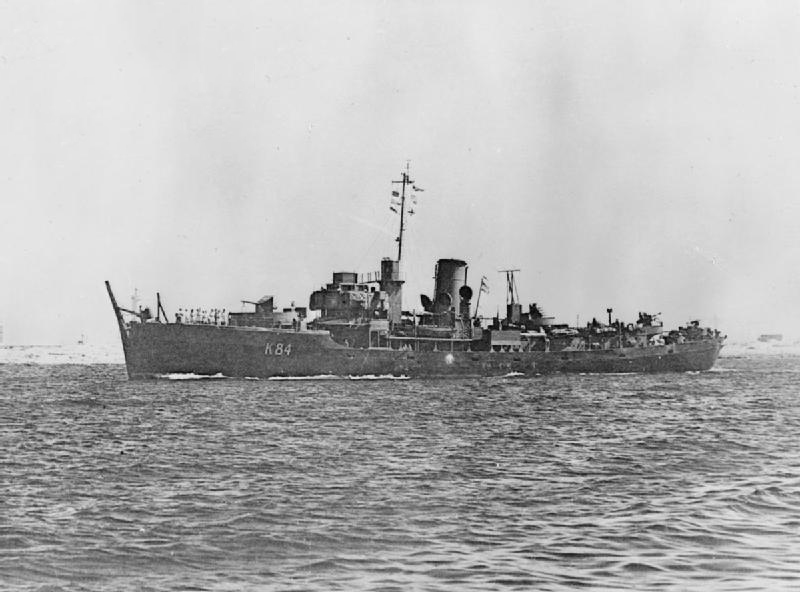
HMS Hyacinth

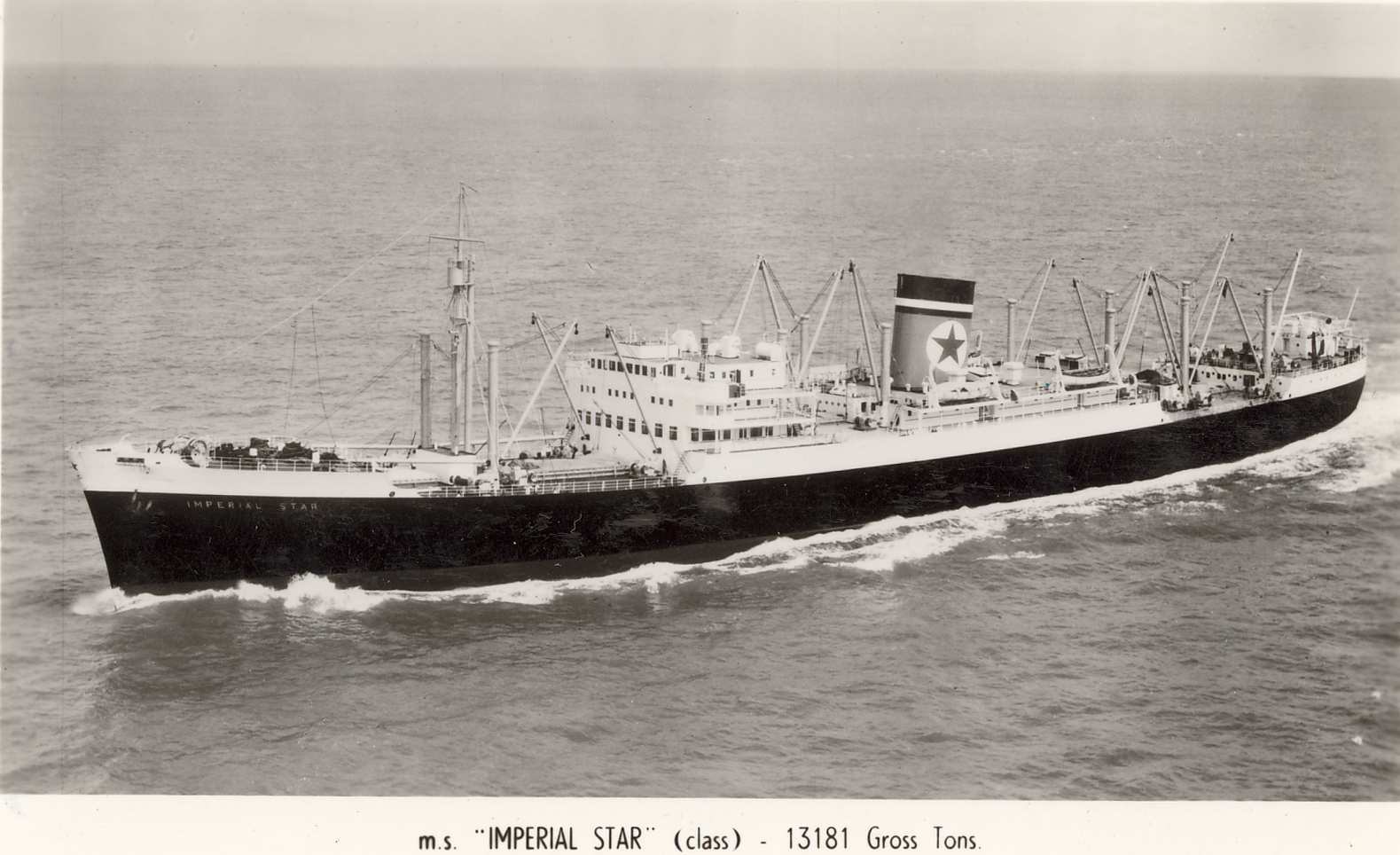
Imperial Star

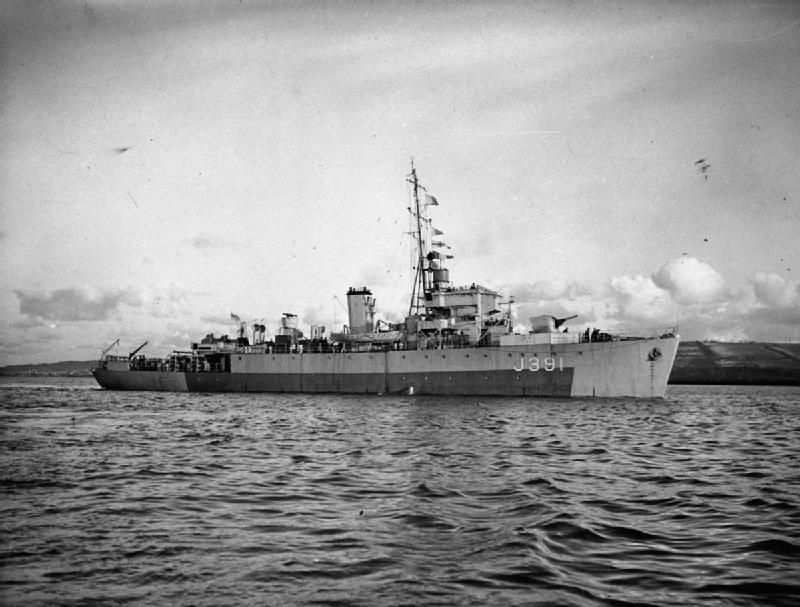
HMS Liberty

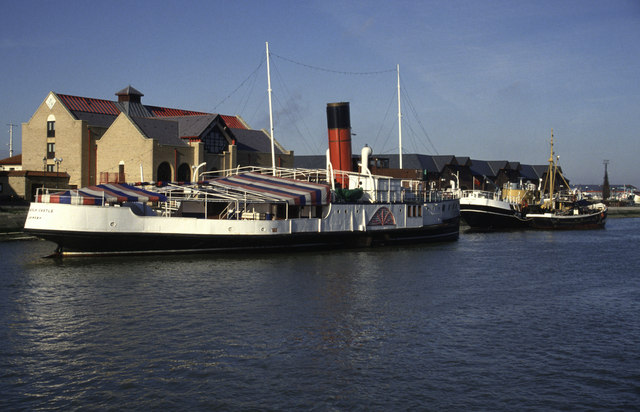
Lincoln Castle

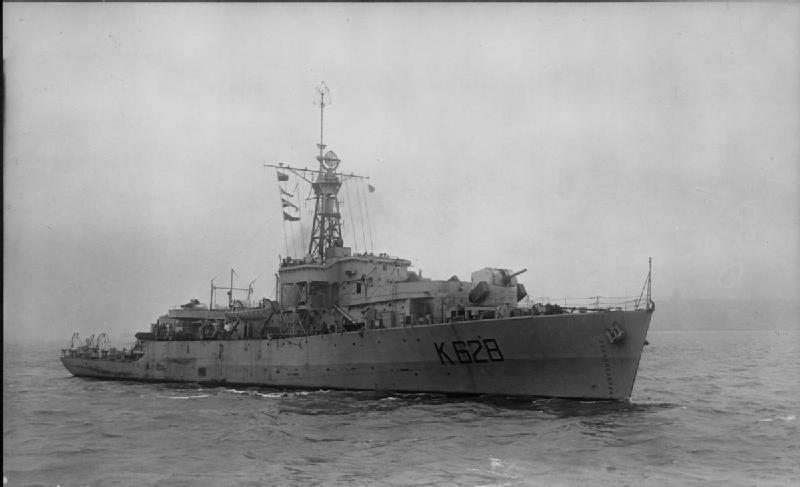
HMS Loch Killisport

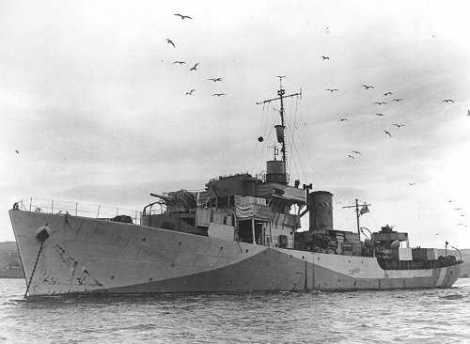
HMCS Long Branch

HMS LST 3041

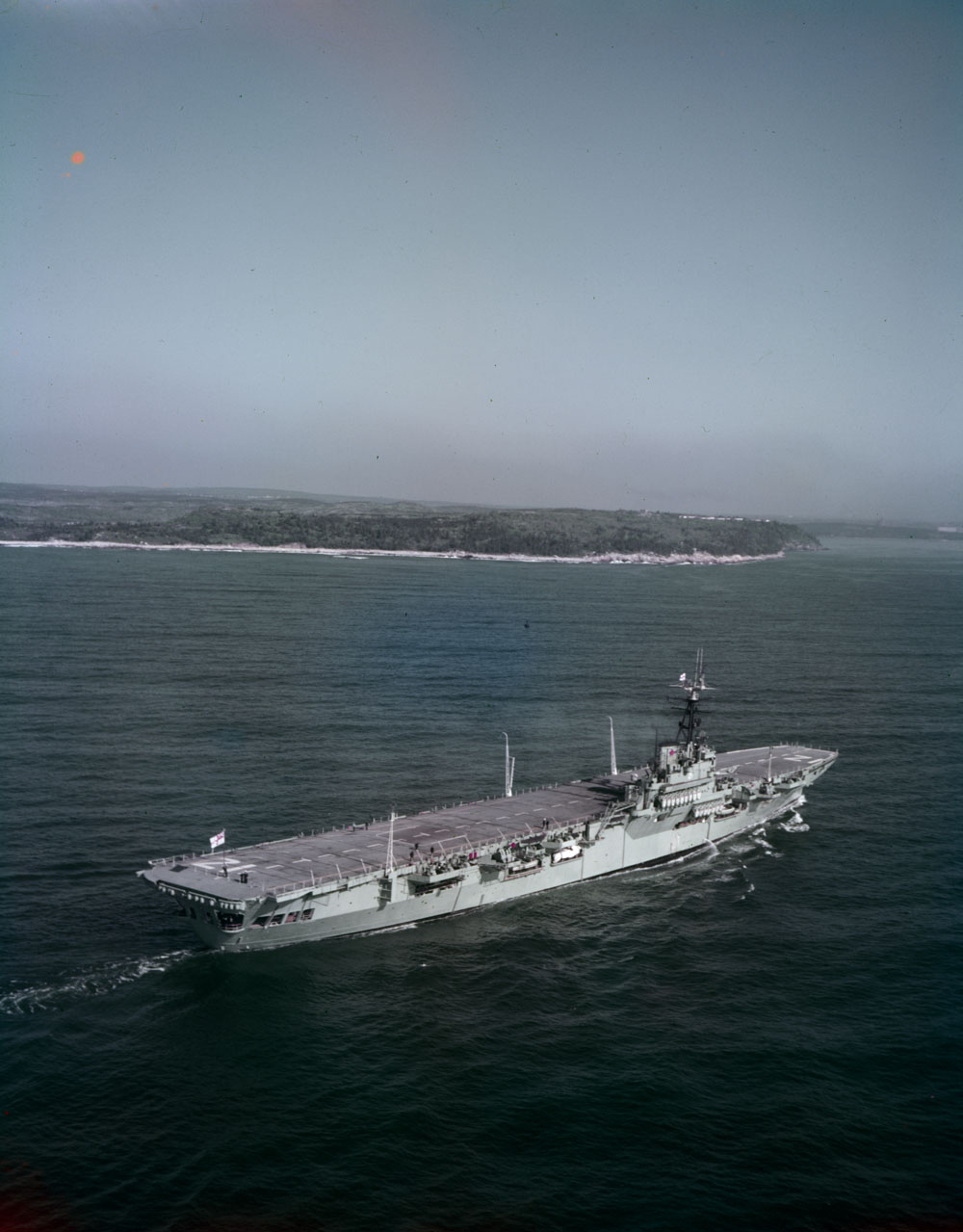
HMCS Magnificent

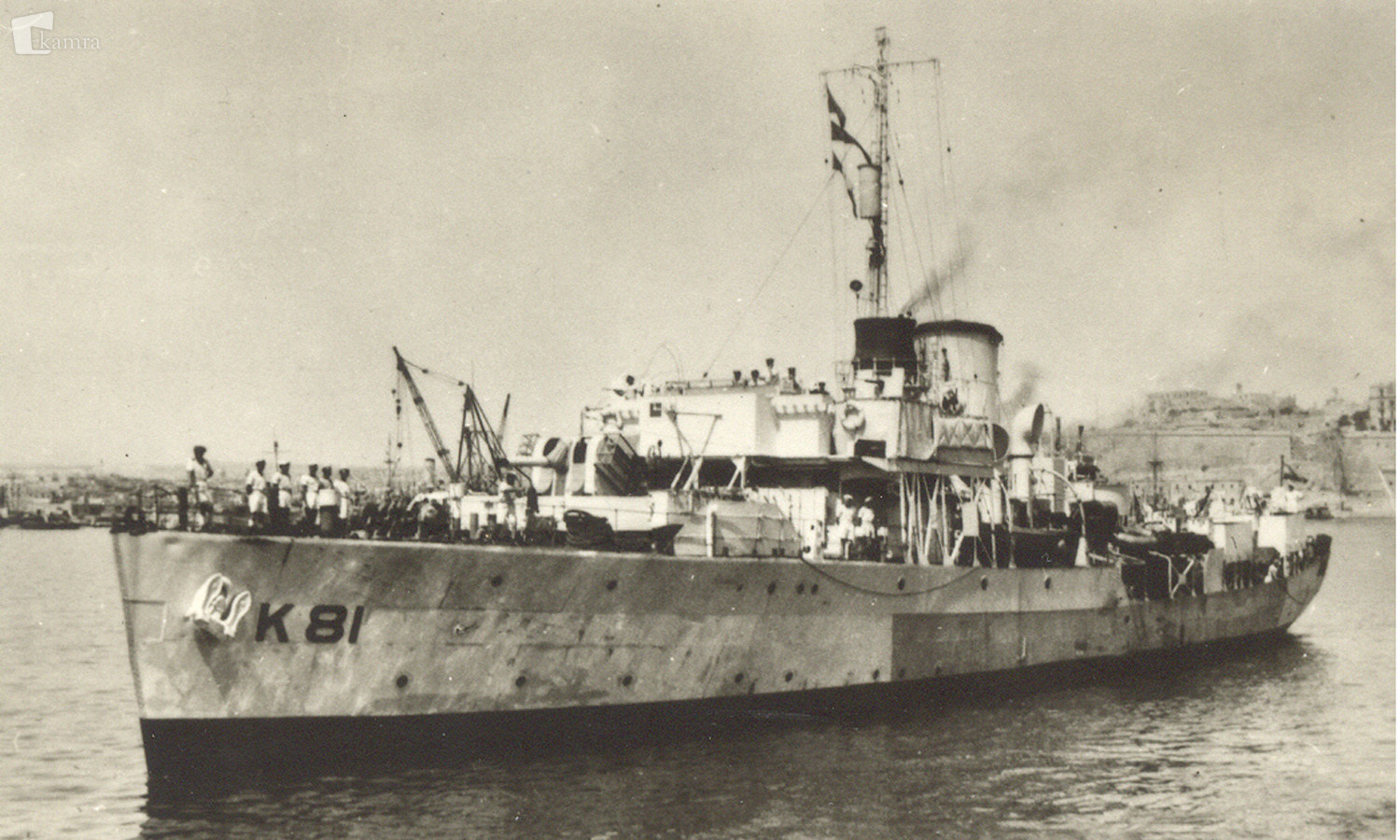
HMS Mallow

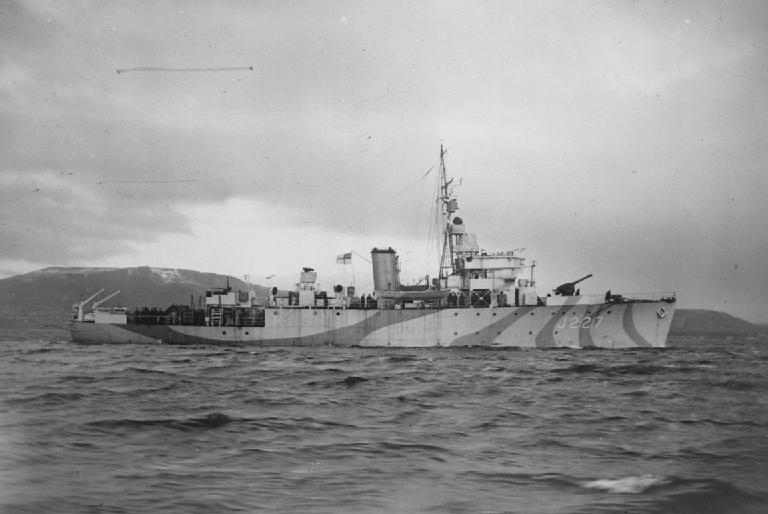
HMS Mutine

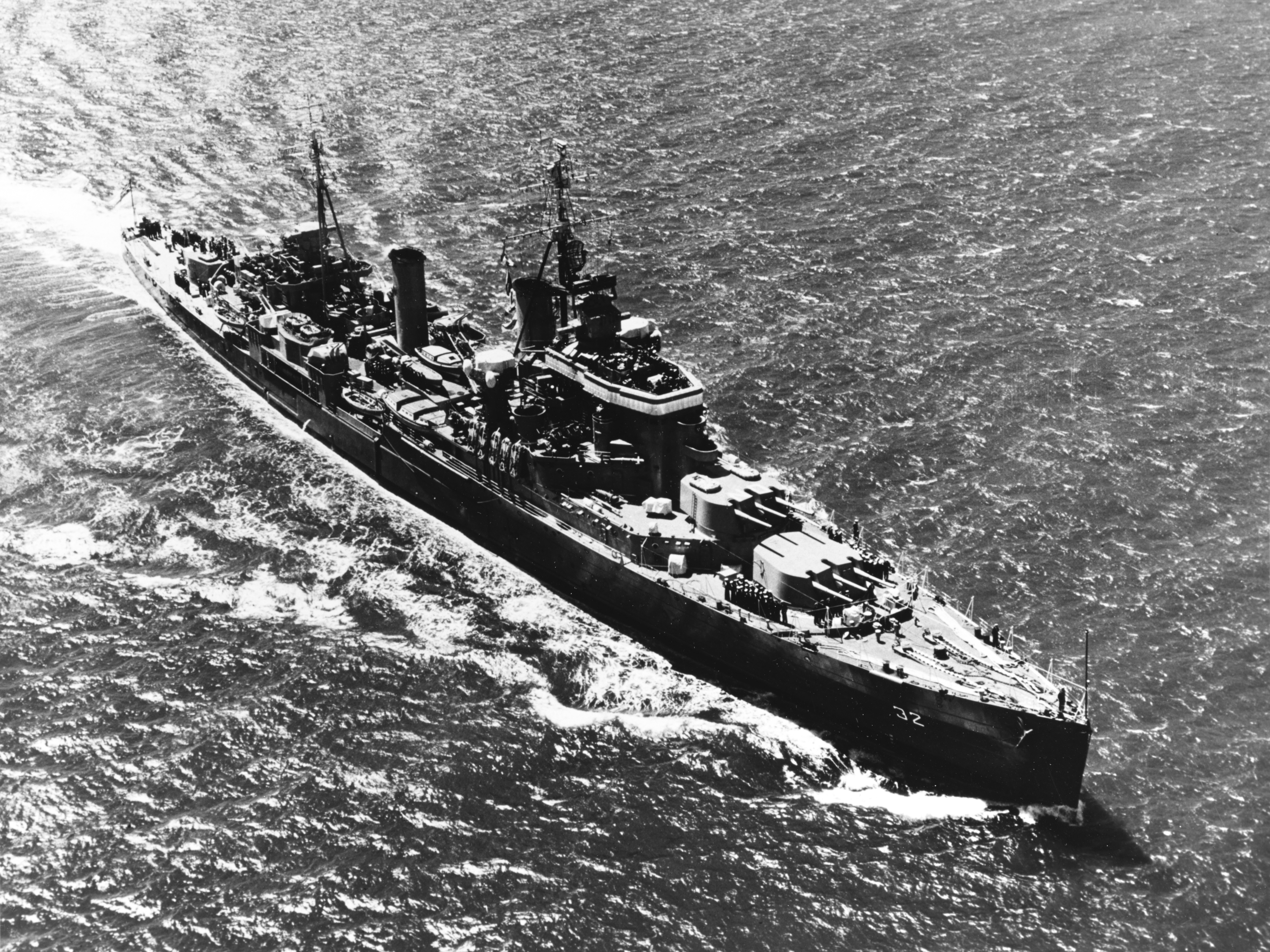
HMCS Ontario

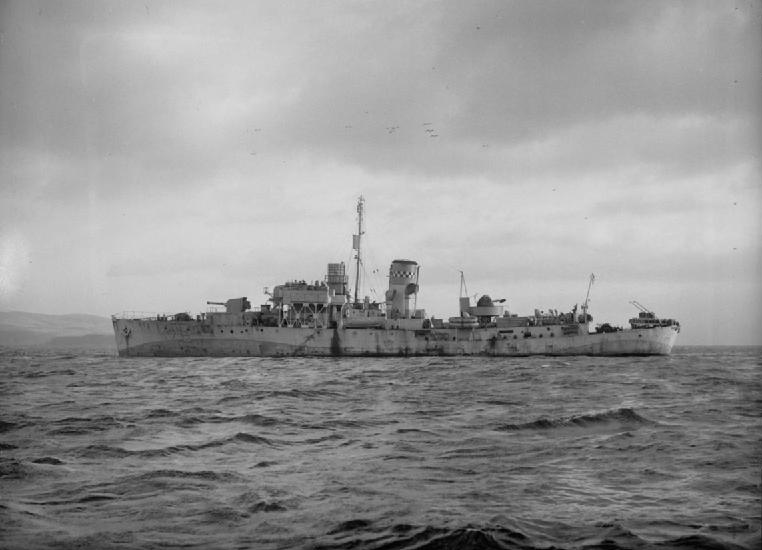
HMS Orchis

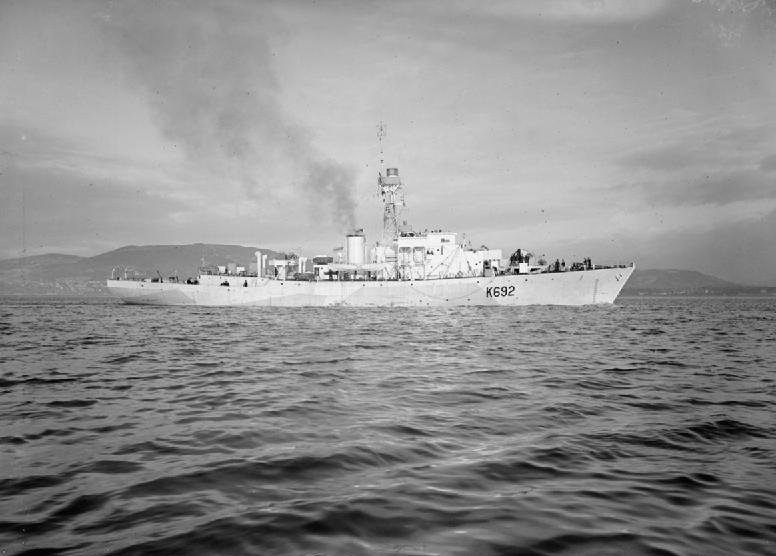
HMS Oxford Castle

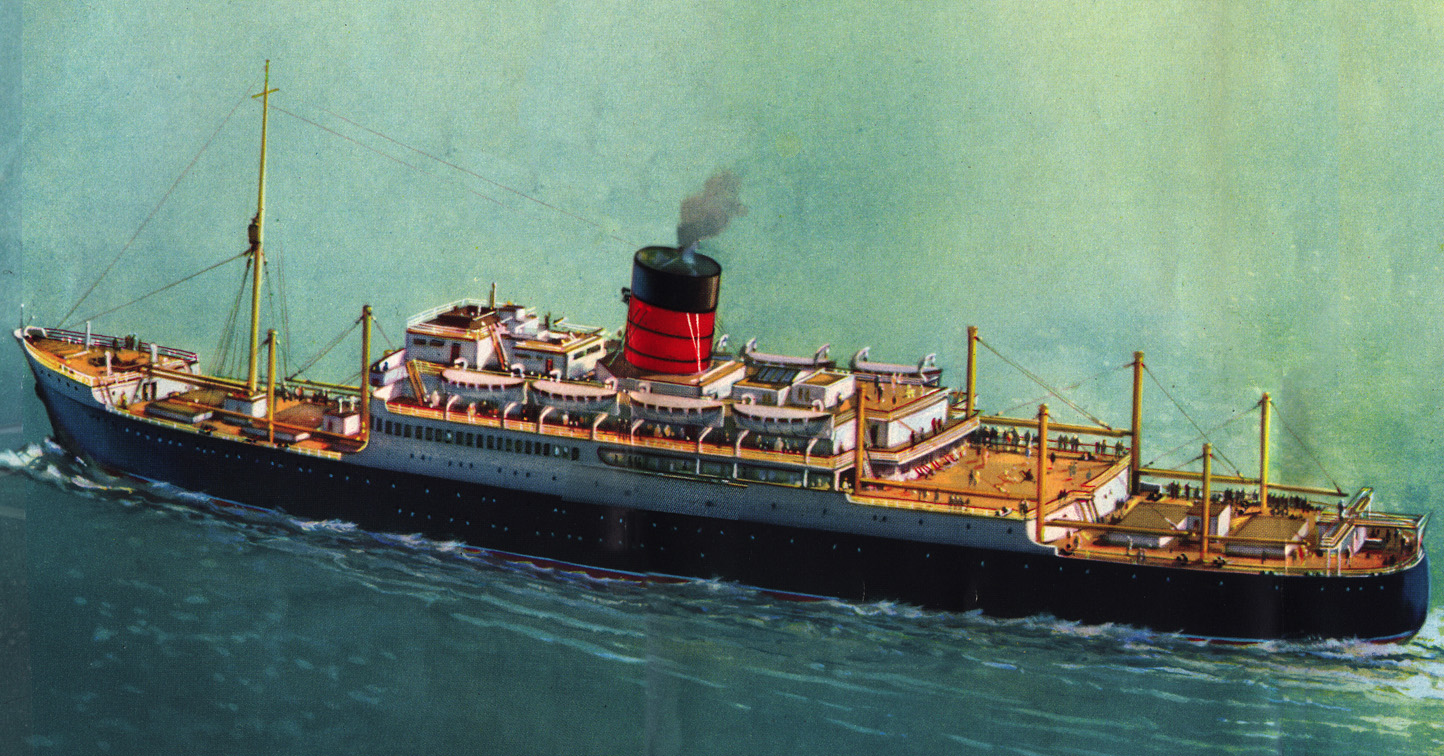
RMS Parthia (artist's impression)

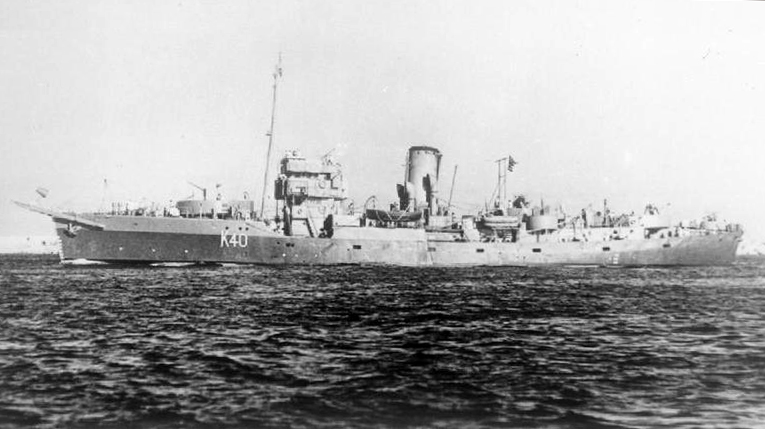
Sakhtouris (launched as HMS Peony)

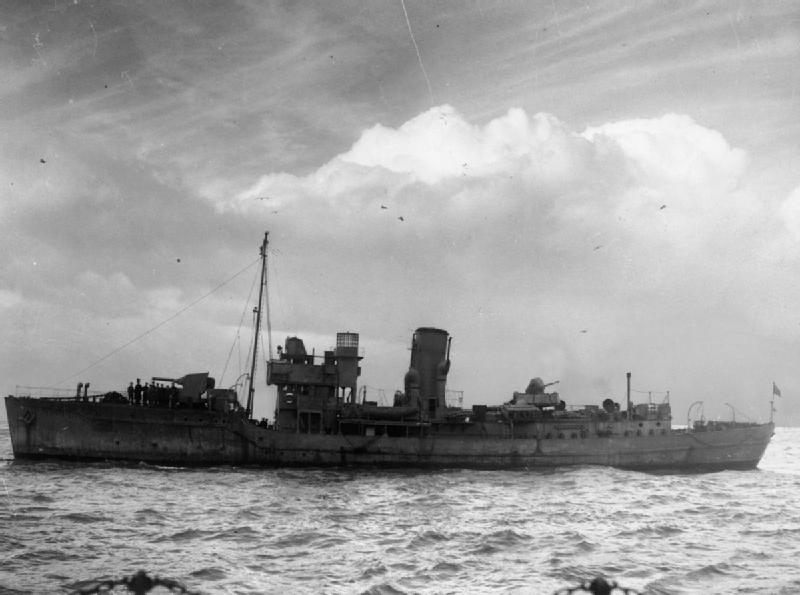
HMS Periwinkle

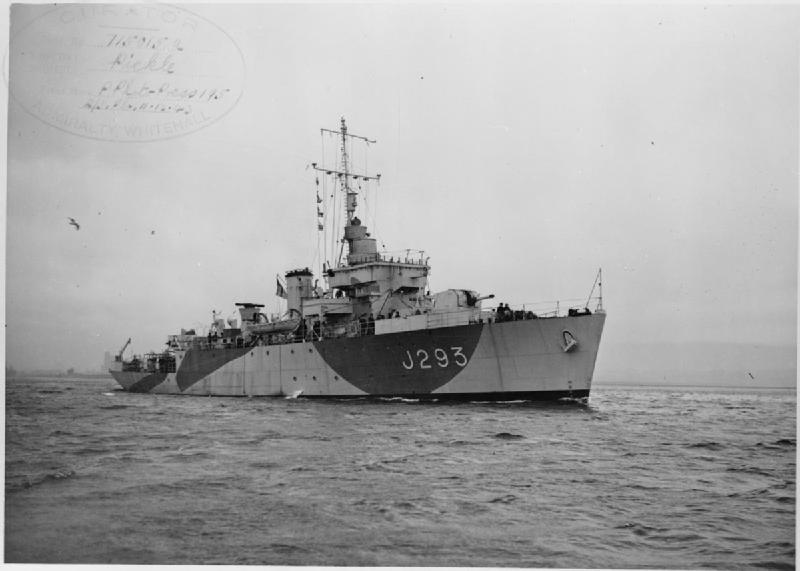
HMS Pickle

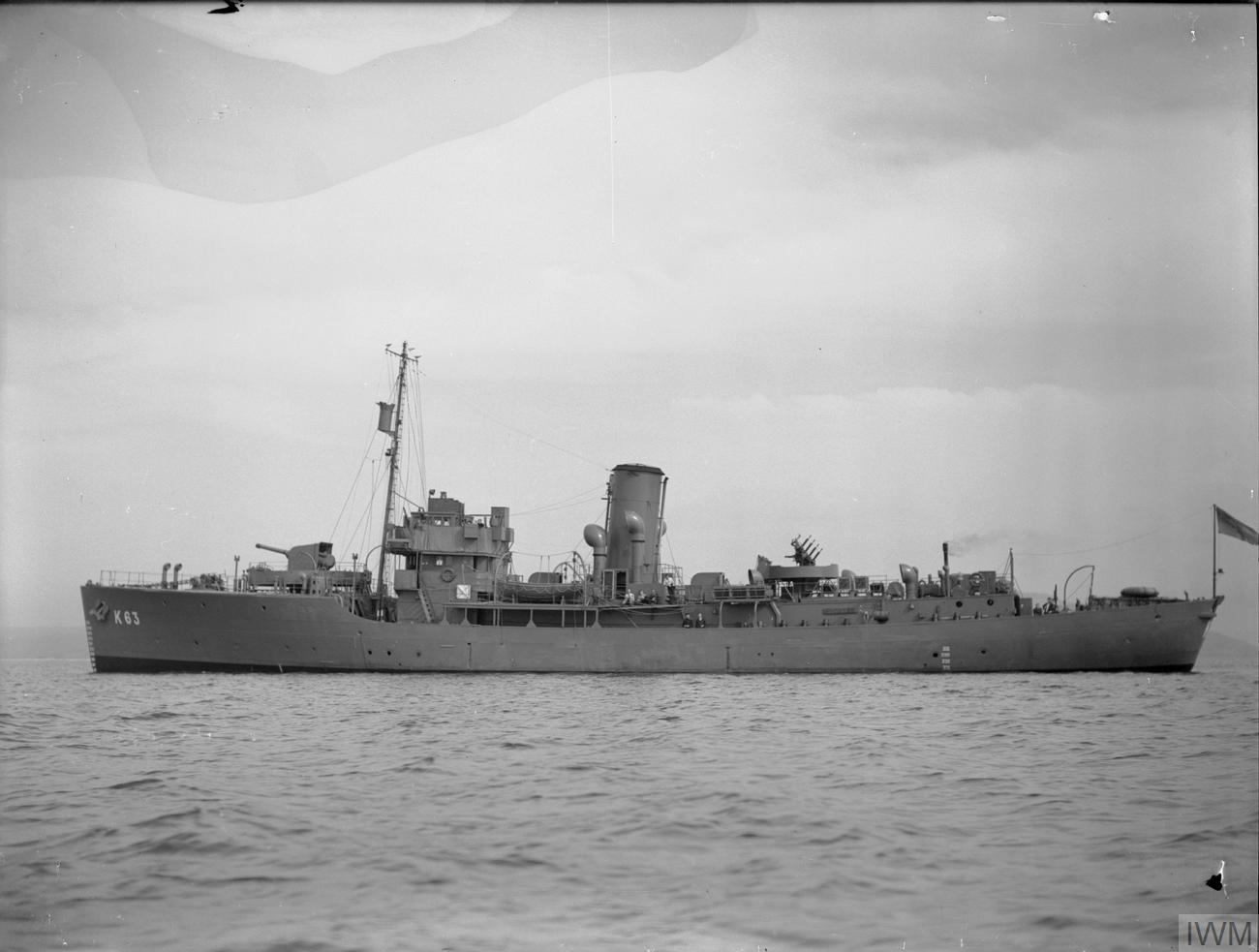
HMS Picotee

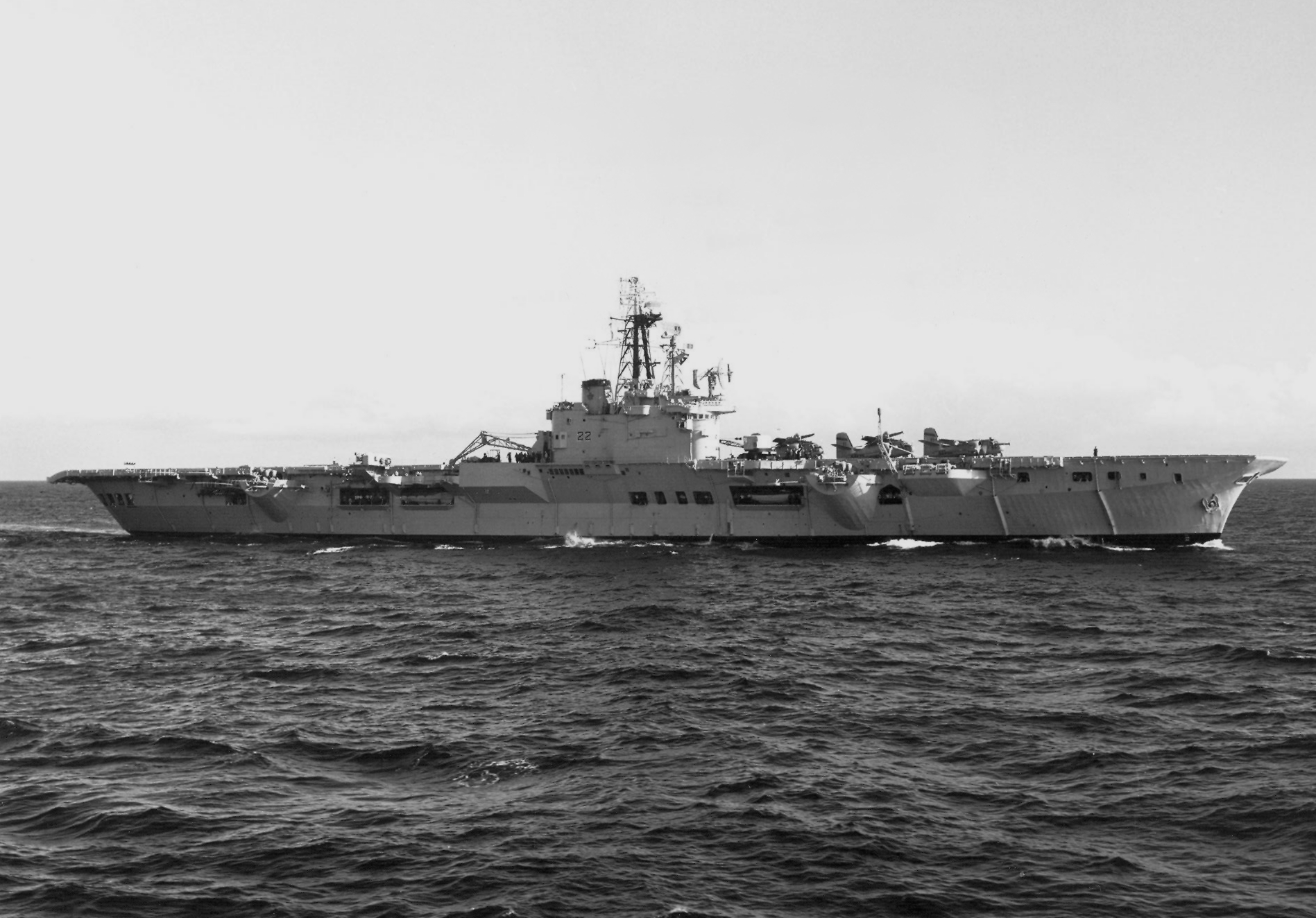
HMCS Bonaventure (launched as HMS Powerful)

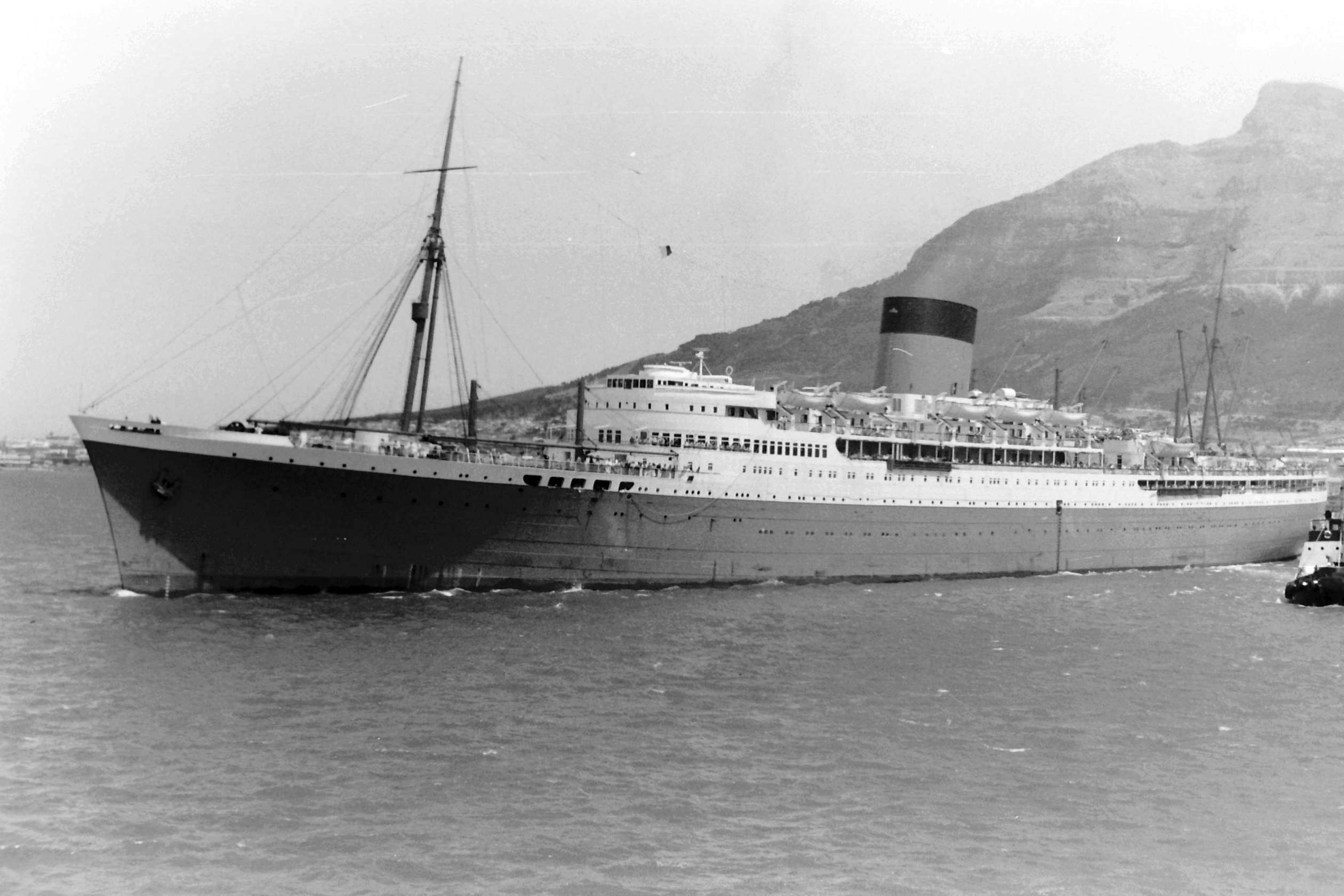
Pretoria Castle

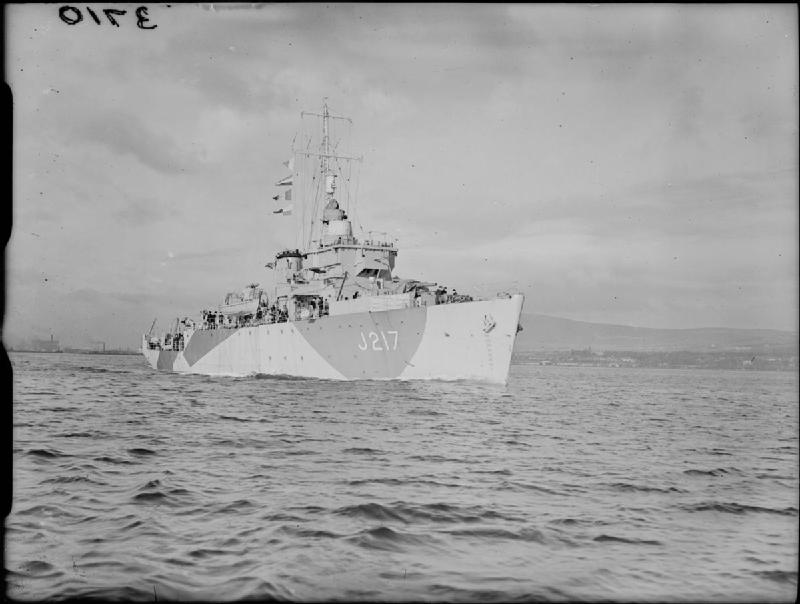
HMS Loyalty (launched as HMS Rattler)

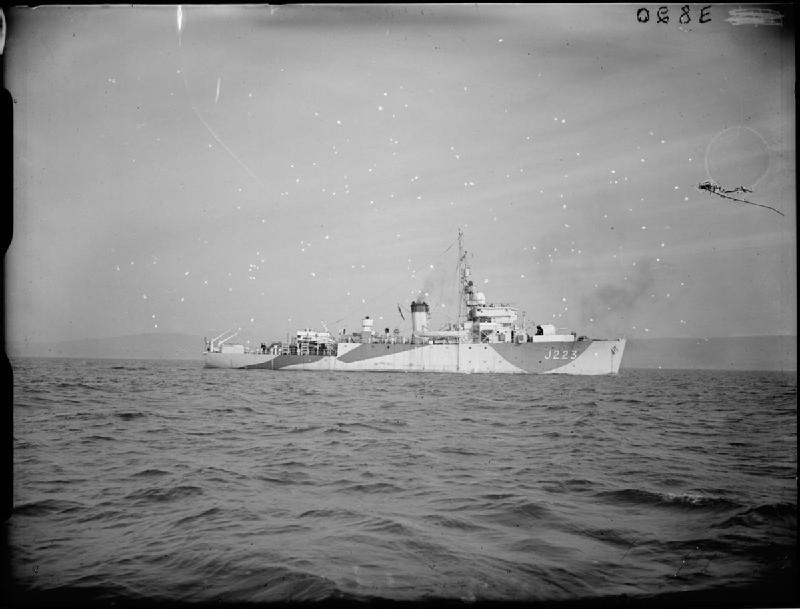
HMS Ready

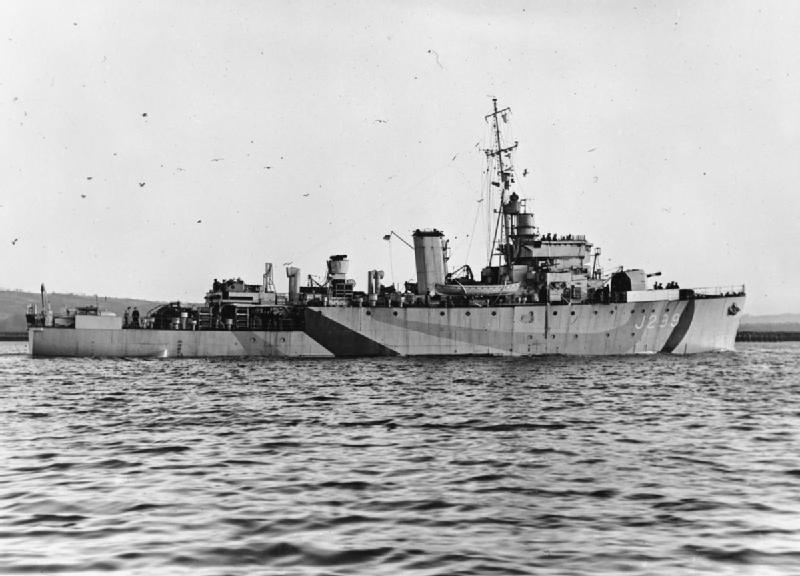
HMS Rifleman

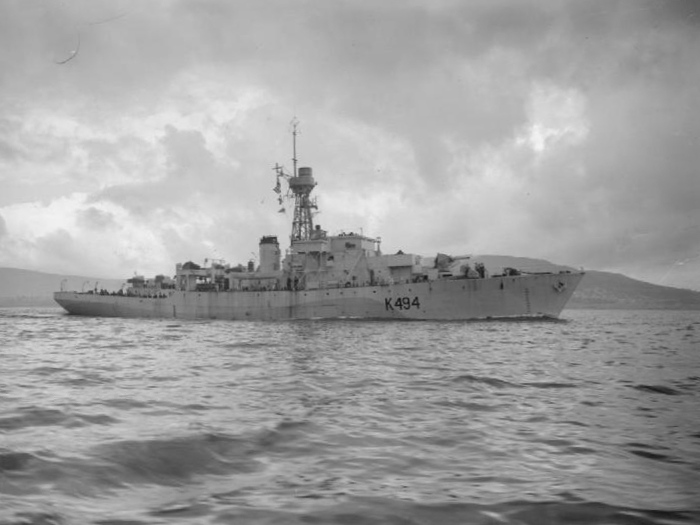
HMCS Arnprior (launched as HMS Rising Castle)

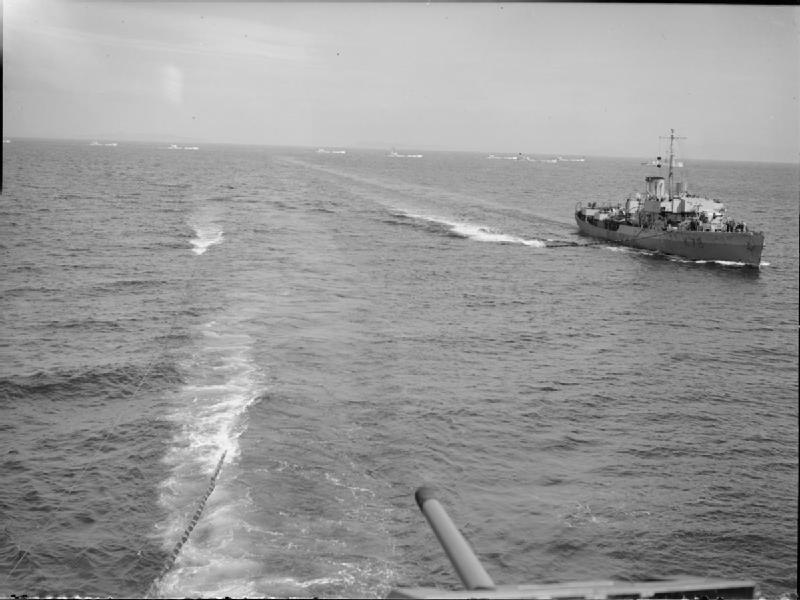
HMS Rhododendron

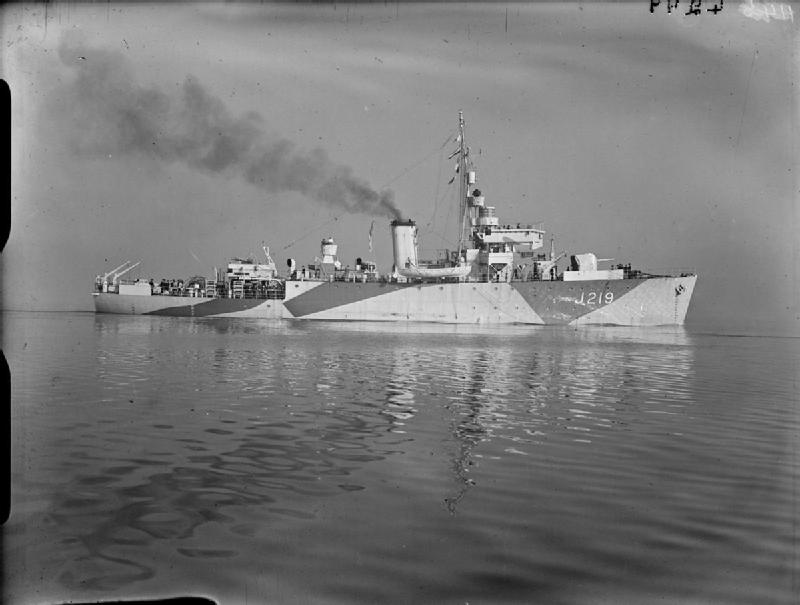
HMS Rosario

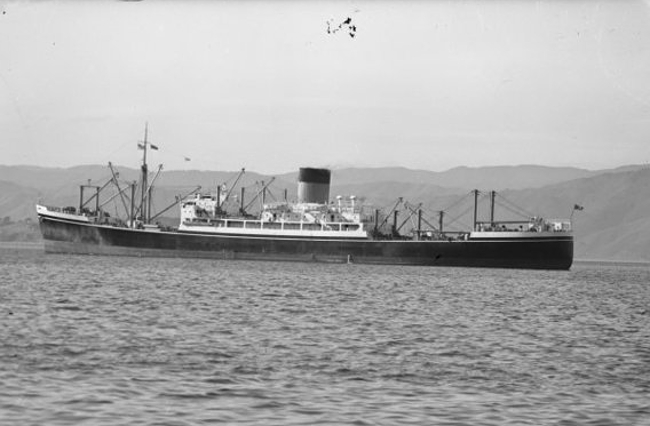
Runic

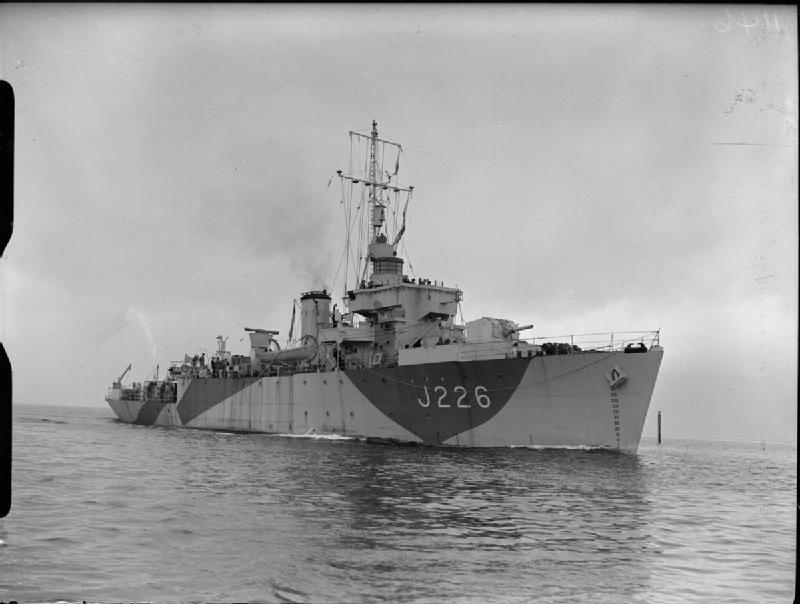
HMS Spanker

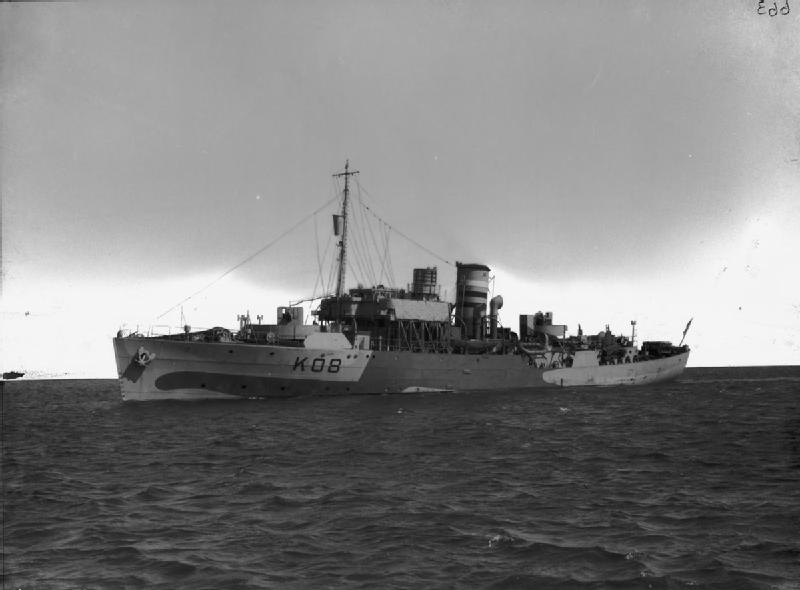
HMS Spiraea

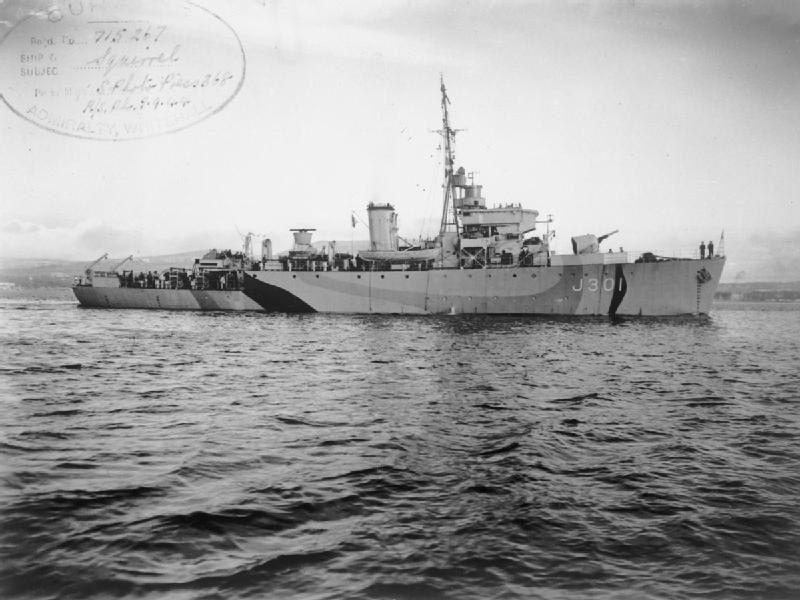
HMS Squirrel

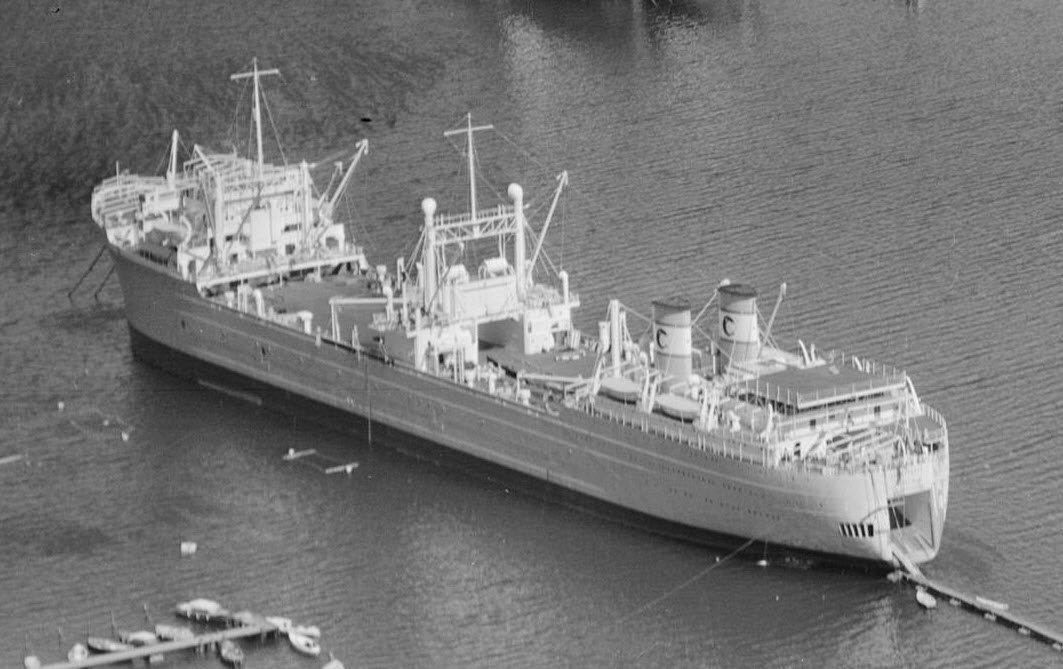
Thorshavet

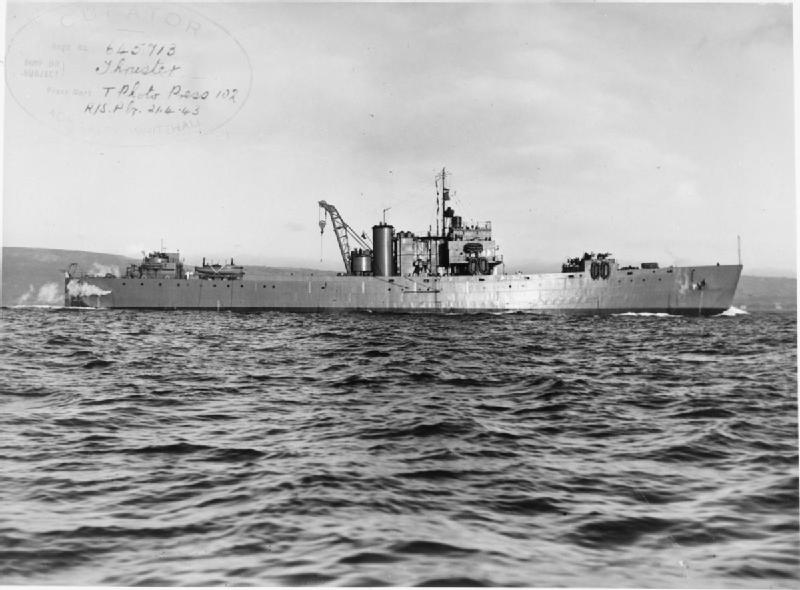
HMS Thruster

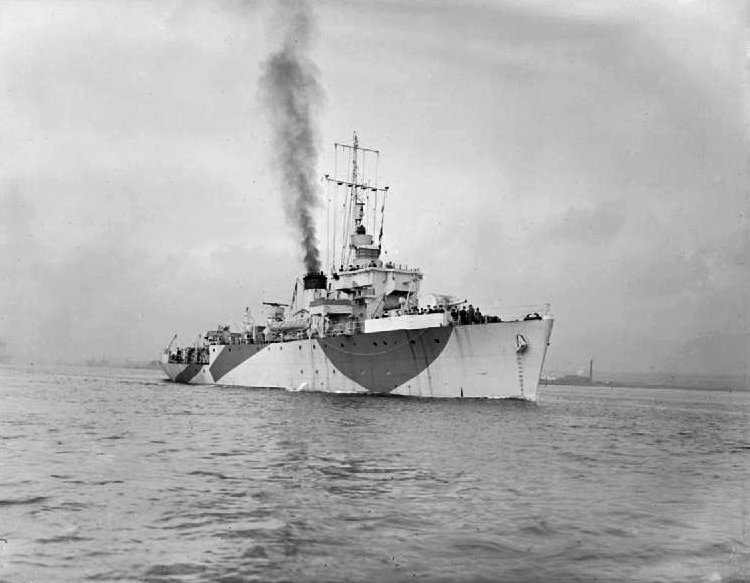
HMS Vestal

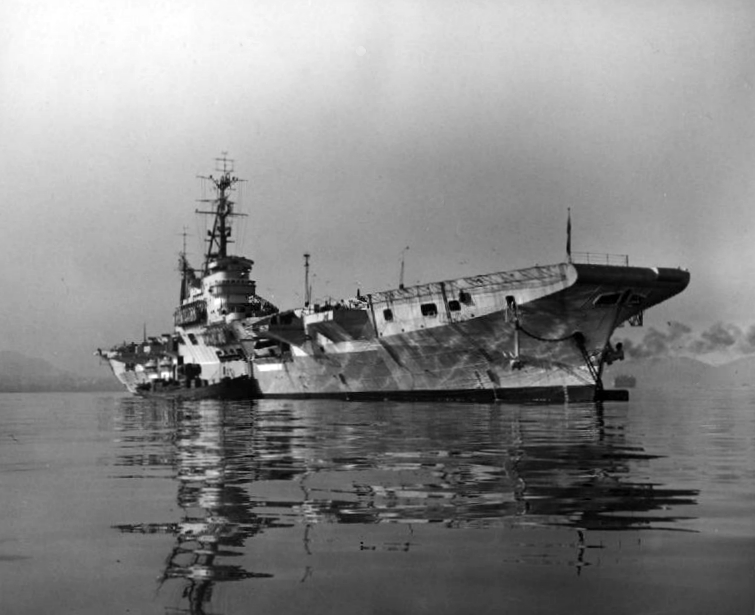
HMS Warrior

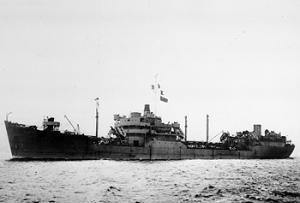
RFA Wave King

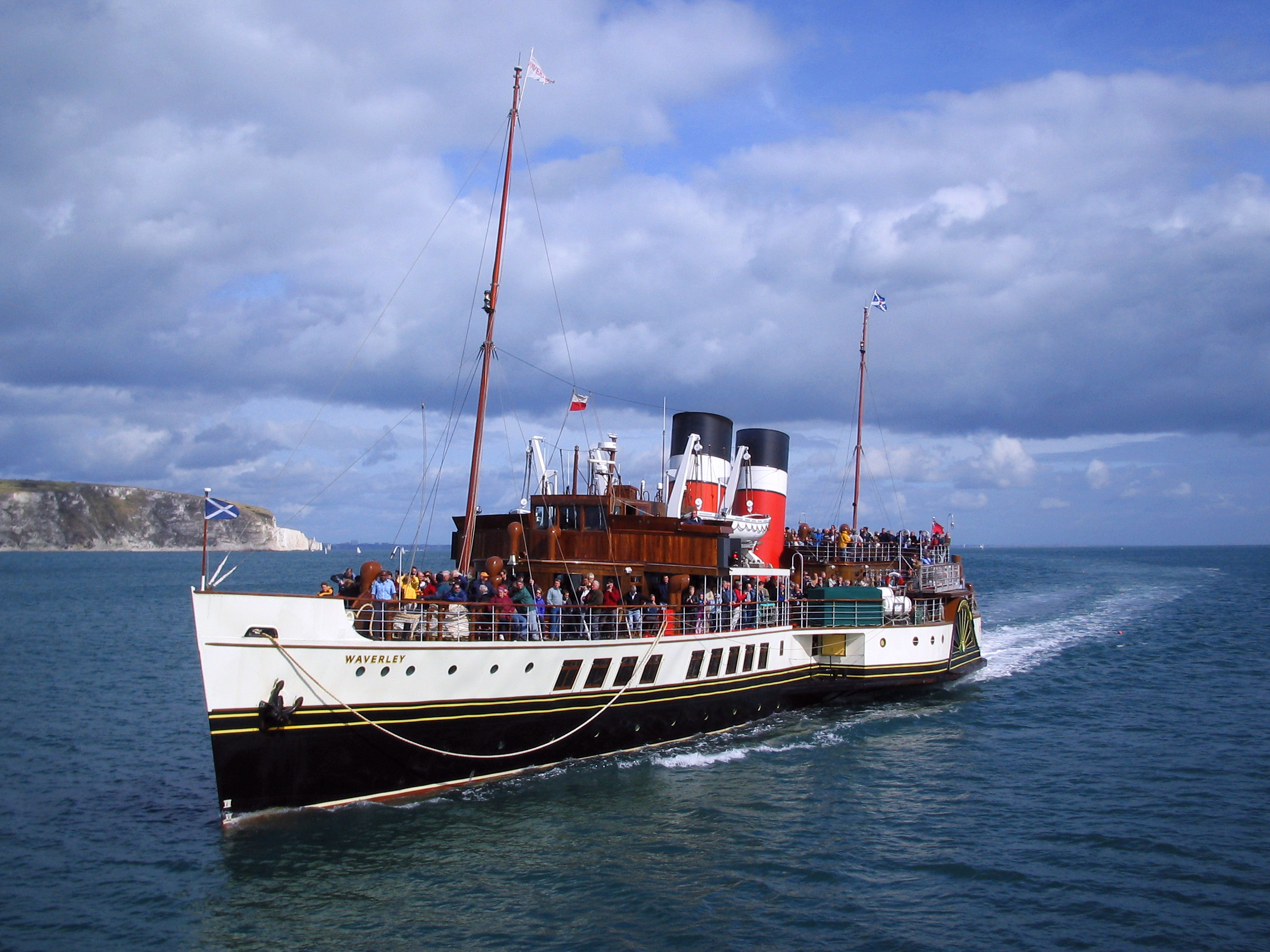
Waverley

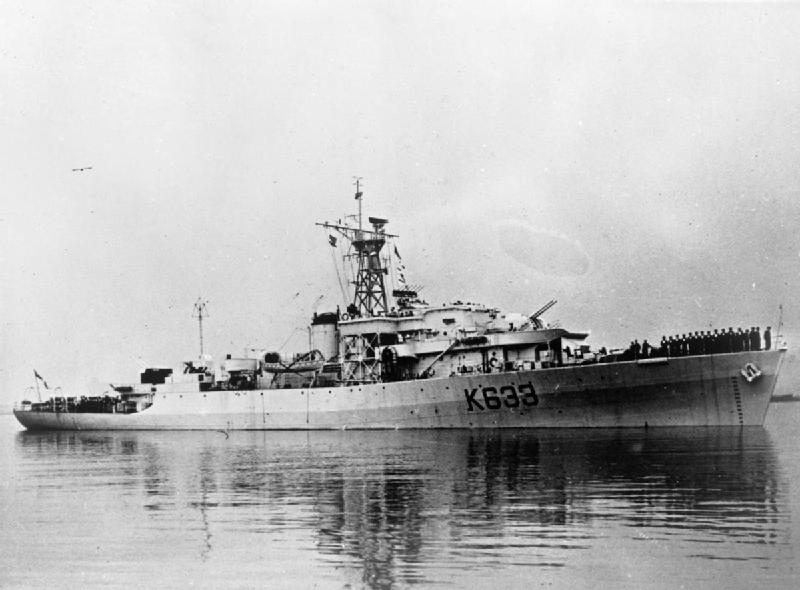
HMS Whitesand Bay

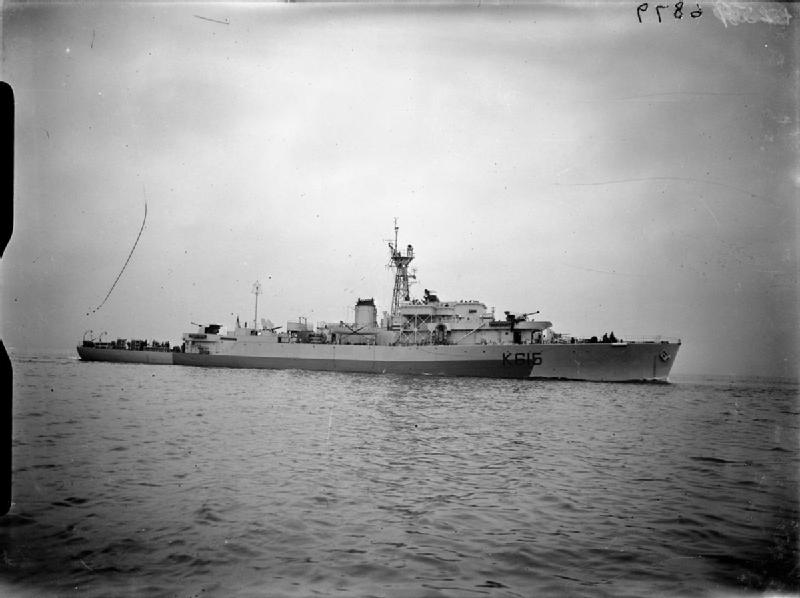
HMS Widemouth Bay

== 1950s ==
- SS British Consul, oil tanker for British Tanker Co, launched 2 February 1950, completed 9 June 1950.
- SS Carnarvon, whale catcher for Australian Whaling Commission, launched 6 February 1950, completed 27 April 1950.
- SS Suevic, refrigerated cargo ship for Shaw Savill Line, launched 7 March 1950, completed 5 July 1950.
- MV British Explorer, oil tanker for British Tanker Co, launched 21 March 1950, completed 8 July 1950.
- MV Juan Perón, whale factory ship for Compania Argentina de Pesca, launched 4 April 1950, completed 15 October 1951.
- MV British Prospector, oil tanker for British Tanker Co, launched 1 June 1950, completed 28 September 1950.
- MV Bratsberg, oil tanker for Borgestad A/S, launched 14 June 1950, completed 5 October 1950.
- MV Ascanius, cargo ship for Blue Funnel Line, launched 15 June 1950, completed 21 November 1950.
- SS Verena, oil tanker for Anglo Saxon Petroleum Co, launched 29 June 1950, completed 9 November 1950.
- SS Ixion, cargo ship for Blue Funnel Line, launched 28 July 1950, completed 5 January 1951.
- MV British Surveyor, oil tanker for British Tanker Co, launched 15 August 1950, completed 8 December 1950.
- MV Laganfield, oil tanker for Hunting & Sons, launched 26 September 1950, completed 29 December 1950.
- MV Binta, oil tanker for Per Gjerding, launched 28 September 1950, completed 19 December 1950.
- SS Kvint, whale catcher for Falkland Shipowners Co, launched 28 September 1950, completed 27 November 1950.
- MV Bolette, oil tanker for Fred Olsen & Co, launched 28 September 1950, completed 17 January 1951.
- MV Ringerd, oil tanker for Olav Ringdal, launched 12 December 1950, completed 12 March 1951.
- MV Dalfonn, oil tanker for Sigval Bergsen, launched 12 January 1951, completed 15 May 1951.
- MV Orkdal, oil tanker for Moltzaua & Christensen, launched 8 February 1951, completed 17 April 1951.
- ST Simba, tug for East African Railways, launched 12 March 1951, completed 8 June 1951.
- SS Rhodesia Castle, passenger ship for Union Castle, launched 5 April 1951, completed 6 October 1951.
- SS Setter 7, whale catcher for United Whalers, launched 3 May 1951, completed 15 September 1951.
- MV Bollsta, oil tanker for Fred Olsen & Co, launched 5 May 1951, completed 6 October 1951.
- MV Tank King, oil tanker for Sigurd Herlofsen A/S, launched 22 May 1951, completed 31 August 1951.
- ST Nyati, tug for East African Railways, launched 23 May 1951, completed 15 September 1951.
- SS Setter 8, whale catcher for United Whalers, launched 7 June 1951, completed 11 October 1951.
- MV Port Nelson, cargo ship for Port Line, launched 19 June 1951, completed 31 October 1951.
- SS Kenya Castle, passenger ship for Union Castle, launched 21 June 1951, completed 16 February 1952, renamed Amerikanis 1967, scrapped 2001.
- MV France Stove, oil tanker for Lorentzen A/S, launched 2 July 1951, completed 12 November 1951.
- MV Star 9, whale catcher for Hvalfinger A/S, launched 9 July 1951, completed 30 October 1951.
- SS Eastern Star, cargo ship for Australia China Line, launched 2 August 1951, completed 20 December 1951.
- MV J. K. Hansen, whale catcher for Union Whaling Co, launched 3 August 1951, completed 24 October 1951.
- MV Anders Arvesen, whale catcher for Union Whaling Co, launched 23 August 1951, completed 15 November 1951.
- MV Iliade, oil tanker for Societe Navale Delmas Vieljeux, launched 11 October 1951, completed 25 April 1952.
- MV Ebro, cargo ship for Royal Mail Line, launched 29 November 1951, completed 12 June 1952.
- MV King Malcolm, cargo ship for King Line, launched 29 November 1951, completed 29 February 1952.
- SS Roonagh Head, cargo ship for Ulster Steamship Co, launched 17 December 1951, completed 20 March 1952.
- SS British Skill, oil tanker for British Tanker Co, launched 16 January 1952, completed 12 June 1952.
- MV Onitsha, cargo ship for Elder Dempster, launched 29 January 1952, completed 5 June 1952.
- MV King Alexander, cargo ship for King Line, launched 14 February 1952, completed 6 May 1952.
- MV Essequibo, cargo ship for Royal Mail Line, launched 25 March 1952, completed 11 September 1952.
- MV Janita, oil tanker for Spermacet Whaling Co, launched 25 March 1952, completed 9 July 1952.
- SS Braemar Castle, passenger ship for Union Castle, launched 5 April 1952, completed 8 November 1952.
- MV Irish Coast, ferry for Coast Lines, launched 8 May 1952, completed 17 October 1952.
- MV Cedric, refrigerated cargo ship for Shaw Savill Line, launched 22 May 1952, completed 11 November 1952.
- MV Busen 5, whale catcher for Tongsberg A/S, launched 10 June 1952, completed 5 September 1952.
- MV Obuasi, cargo ship for Elder Dempster, launched 24 June 1952, completed 12 November 1952.
- MV Janova, oil tanker for Spermacet Whaling Co, launched 8 July 1952, completed 30 January 1953.
- MV Raeburn, cargo ship for Lamport & Holt, launched 6 August 1952, completed 28 November 1952.
- MV Clydefield, oil tanker for Hunting & Sons, launched 16 September 1952, completed 21 January 1953.
- MV Cymric, refrigerated cargo ship for Shaw Savill Line, launched 5 November 1952, completed 15 May 1953.
- MV King Arthur, cargo ship for King Line, launched 19 November 1952, completed 19 March 1953.
- MV Beaverbank, cargo ship for Bank Line, launched 3 December 1952, completed 26 February 1953.
- MV Nessbank, cargo ship for Bank Line, launched 18 December 1952, completed 24 June 1953.
- MV Blandford, oil tanker for Blandford Shipping, launched 19 December 1952, completed 14 May 1953.
- SS Harpa, oil tanker for Anglo Saxon Petroleum Co, launched 29 January 1953, completed 11 June 1953.
- MV Maid of Argyll, (Clyde-built), ferry for British Railways, launched 4 March 1953, completed 1 June 1953, renamed City of Piraeus 1975 and City of Corfu 1993.
- PS Maid of the Loch, (Clyde-built), paddle steamer for British Railways, launched 5 March 1953, completed 4 May 1953.
- MV Maid of Skelmorlie, (Clyde-built), ferry for British Railways, launched 2 April 1953, completed 24 June 1953, renamed Ala 1976.
- MV Irex, oil tanker for A/S Field, launched 15 April 1953, completed 8 July 1953.
- MV Britta, oil tanker for Arthur H Mathieson, launched 12 May 1953, completed 17 September 1953.
- MV Fleetbank, cargo ship for Bank Line, launched 29 June 1953, completed 14 October 1953.
- MV Setter 9, whale catcher for Hector Whaling Ltd, launched 15 July 1953, completed 19 November 1953.
- SS Rathlin Head, cargo ship for Ulster Steamship Co, launched 10 August 1953, completed 4 November 1953.
- MV Jaranda, oil tanker for Anders Jahre A/S, launched 23 October 1953, completed 9 January 1954.
- MV Elpenor, cargo ship for Blue Funnel Line, launched 11 November 1953, completed 22 April 1954.
- MV Jarena, oil tanker for A/S Kosmos, launched 25 August 1953, completed 20 November 1953.
- MV Port Montreal, refrigerated cargo ship for Port Line, launched 22 September 1953, completed 4 February 1954.
- MV Tantallon Castle, cargo ship for Union Castle, launched 22 October 1953, completed 5 March 1954.
- SS British Engineer, oil tanker for British Tanker Co, launched 24 November 1953, completed 30 April 1954.
- HMS Kemerton, Ton-class minesweeper for British Admiralty, launched 27 November 1953, completed 21 May 1954, scrapped 1975.
- MV British Corporal, oil tanker for British Tanker Co, launched 9 December 1953, completed 1 July 1954.
- MV British Gunner, oil tanker for British Tanker Co, launched 9 December 1953, completed 6 May 1954.
- SS Loch Gowan, cargo ship for Royal Mail Line, launched 19 January 1954, completed 27 June 1954.
- SS Iberia, passenger ship for P&O, launched 21 January 1954, completed 10 September 1954, maiden voyage 15 September 1954, scrapped 1973.
- SS Ballylumford, collier for John Kelly Ltd, launched 3 February 1954, completed 7 May 1954.
- MV Tintagel Castle, cargo ship for Union Castle, launched 4 February 1954, completed 5 June 1954.
- HMS Kirkliston, Ton-class minesweeper for British Admiralty, launched 18 February 1954, completed 21 August 1954, scrapped 1991.
- HMS Braysford, seaward defence craft for British Admiralty, launched 19 February 1954, completed 8 May 1954.
- YC 327, lighter for British Admiralty, launched 19 March 1954, completed 1 July 1954.
- HMS Bryansford, seaward defence craft for British Admiralty, launched 2 April 1954, completed 10 September 1954.
- MV British Sergeant, oil tanker for British Tanker Co, launched 14 April 1954 completed 20 August 1954.
- HMS Laleston, Ton-class minesweeper for British Admiralty, launched 18 May 1954, completed 10 March 1955, scrapped 1985.
- MV Pontia, ship for Pelagos A/S, launched 2 June 1954, completed 15 September 1954.
- SS Cerinthus, oil tanker for Hadley Shipping Co, launched 29 June 1954, completed 9 November 1954.
- HMS Torquay, Whitby-class frigate for British Admiralty, launched 1 July 1954, completed 10 May 1956, scrapped 1987.
- HMS Lanton, Ton-class minesweeper for British Admiralty, launched 30 July 1954, completed 10 March 1955, scrapped 1970.
- SS Southern Cross, passenger ship for Shaw Savill Line, launched 17 August 1954, delivered 28 February 1955, renamed Calypso 1973, Calypso I 1980, ''Azure Seas 1981 and Ocean Breeze 1992, scrapped 2003.
- RFA Tide Austral, fleet tanker for Royal Australian Navy, launched 1 September 1954, completed 17 May 1955, renamed RFA Tide Austral 1955 and HMAS Supply 1962.
- MV Belfast, oil tanker for Belships Co, launched 28 September 1954, completed 24 February 1955.
- MV Cedarbank, cargo ship for Blue Funnel Line, launched 29 September 1954, completed 5 January 1955.
- MV Owerri, cargo ship for Elder Dempster, launched 14 October 1954, completed 21 January 1955.
- HMS Letterston, Ton-class minesweeper for British Admiralty, launched 26 October 1954, completed 29 June 1955, scrapped 1971.
- MV Western Prince, cargo ship for Prince Line, launched 29 December 1954, completed 27 April 1955.
- Harlandic II, launch for Harland and Woolf, launched 1953.
- HMS Leverton, Ton-class minesweeper for British Admiralty, launched 2 March 1955, completed 25 August 1955, scrapped 1972.
- MV Port Melbourne, refrigerated cargo ship for Port Line, launched 10 March 1955, completed 7 July 1955.
- MV Foylebank, cargo ship for Bank Line, launched 24 March 1955, completed 4 August 1955.
- MV Triaster, cargo ship for British Phosphate Carriers, launched 21 April 1955, completed 21 October 1955.
- MV Ulster Premier, coaster for Belfast Steamship Co, launched 26 April 1955, completed 20 September 1955.
- SS Vibex, oil tanker for Shell Oil Co, launched 5 May 1955, completed 20 October 1955.
- HMS Kildarton, Ton-class minesweeper for British Admiralty, launched 23 May 1955, completed 25 November 1955.
- SS Reina Del Mar, passenger ship for PSNC, launched 7 June 1955, completed 8 April 1956, maiden voyage 3 May 1956.
- MV Escalante, cargo ship for Royal Mail Line, launched 5 July 1955, completed 14 December 1955.
- MV Laganbank, cargo ship for Bank Line, launched 5 July 1955, completed 27 October 1955.
- SS Harpula, oil tanker for Shell Oil Co, launched 6 July 1955, completed 21 December 1955.
- MV Dolius, cargo ship for Blue Funnel Line, launched 4 August 1955, completed 5 January 1956.
- HMS Lullington, Ton-class minesweeper for British Admiralty, launched 31 August 1955, completed 1 June 1956, renamed Tahan 1966.
- MV Eden, refrigerated cargo ship for Royal Mail Line, launched 19 October 1955, completed 1 February 1956.
- HMS Confiance, Confiance-class tug for British Admiralty, launched 15 November 1955, completed 19 March 1956.
- MV Southern Prince, cargo ship for Prince Line, launched 16 November 1955, completed 8 March 1956.
- SS Elin Knudsen, oil tanker for Knut Knudsen A/S, launched 17 November 1955, completed 11 April 1956.
- TSS Duke of Lancaster, ferry for British Railways, launched 1 December 1955, completed 22 August 1956.
- MV Oti, cargo ship for Elder Dempster, launched 15 December 1955, completed 26 April 1956.
- TSS Duke of Argyll, ferry for British Railways, launched 12 January 1956, 1956, completed 22 September 1956, renamed Neptunia 1975, Corinthia 1987, Faith Power 1994, Fairy Princess 1995 and Zenith.
- HMS Confident, Confiance-class tug for British Admiralty, launched 17 January 1956, completed 6 September 1956.
- HMS Maddiston, Ton-class minesweeper for British Admiralty, launched 27 January 1956, completed 8 November 1956, scrapped 1975.
- MV Lappe, lighter for Shell Oil, launched 31 January 1956, completed 23 March 1956.
- SS Solfon, oil tanker for Sigval Bergsen, launched 2 March 1956, completed 13 June 1956.
- MV Rowanmore, cargo ship for Johnston Warren & Co, launched 27 March 1956, completed 27 June 1956.
- SS Harvella, oil tanker for Shell Oil Co, launched 26 April 1956, completed 20 September 1956.
- HMS Repton, Ton-class minesweeper for British Admiralty, launched 1 May 1956, completed 11 December 1957.
- HMS Maxton, Ton-class minesweeper for British Admiralty, launched 24 May 1956, completed 19 February 1957, scrapped 1989.
- MV Ondo, cargo ship for Elder Dempster, launched 7 June 1956, completed 24 October 1956.
- MV Tuscany, refrigerated cargo ship for Royal Mail Line, launched 21 June 1956, completed 25 October 1956.
- SS Missouri, oil tanker for Texaco Oil Co, launched 7 August 1956, completed 26 January 1957.
- MV Scottish Coast, ferry for Coast Lines, launched 21 August 1956, completed 1 March 1957.
- HMS Nurton, Ton-class minesweeper for British Admiralty, launched 22 October 1956, completed 21 August 1957, scrapped 1995.
- MV Flying Duck, tug for Clyde Shipping Co, launched 23 May 1956, completed 29 October 1956.
- MV Albany, refrigerated cargo ship for Royal Mail Line, launched 1 November 1956, completed 13 February 1957.
- SS Storfonn, oil tanker for Sigval Bergsen, launched 20 November 1956, completed 31 January 1957.
- MV Port Launceston, refrigerated cargo ship for Port Line, launched 21 November 1956, completed 12 March 1957.
- ST Flying Drake, tug for Clyde Shipping Co, launched 29 November 1956, completed 17 May 1957.
- MV Cloverbank, cargo ship for Bank Line, launched 21 December 1956, completed 7 March 1957.
- MV Afghanistan, ore carrier for Commons Bros Ltd, launched 14 February 1957, completed 20 June 1957.
- HMS Blackpool, Whitby-class frigate for British Admiralty, launched 14 February 1957, completed 14 August 1958, scrapped 1978.
- MV Crestbank, cargo ship for Bank Line, launched 15 February 1957, completed 7 June 1957.
- SS Esso Glasgow, T2 tanker of Esso Petroleum Co, new midsection launched 14 March 1957, completed 17 August 1957.
- MV King Charles, cargo ship for King Line, launched 15 March 1957, completed 25 June 1957.
- SS Vitrinia, oil tanker for Shell Oil, launched 16 April 1957, completed 4 July 1957.
- MV Picardy, refrigerated cargo ship for Royal Mail Line, launched 30 April 1957, completed 22 August 1957.
- MV Thessaly, refrigerated cargo ship for Royal Mail Line, launched 29 May 1957, completed 26 September 1957.
- MV Carronbank, cargo ship for Bank Line, launched 30 May 1957, completed 27 September 1957.
- MV Loch Loyal, refrigerated cargo ship for Royal Mail Line, launched 9 August 1957, completed 30 December 1957.
- MV King George, cargo ship for King Line, launched 27 August 1957, completed 19 December 1957.
- MV Dartbank, cargo ship for Bank Line, launched 28 August 1957, completed 17 January 1958.
- HMS Accord, Confiance-class tug for British Admiralty, launched 10 September 1957, completed 15 October 1958.
- SS British Honour, oil tanker for British Tanker Co, launched 25 September 1957, completed 31 January 1958.
- MV Alaric, cargo ship for Shaw Savill Line, launched 8 October 1957, completed 13 February 1958.
- MV Port Invercargill, refrigerated cargo ship for Port Line, launched 22 November 1957, completed 26 March 1958.
- MV Flying Dipper, tug for Clyde Shipping Co, launched 11 December 1957, completed 27 March 1958.
- RMS Pendennis Castle, passenger ship for Union Castle, launched 24 December 1957, completed 14 November 1958, maiden voyage 1 January 1959, renamed Ocean Queen, Sinbad and Sinbad I, scrapped 1980.
- MV Garrybank, cargo ship for Bank Line, launched 27 December 1957, completed 2 April 1958.
- MV Iron Age, ore carrier for Vallum Shipping Co, launched 20 January 1958, completed 22 May 1958.
- MV Vestfonn, oil tanker for Sigval Bergsen, launched 7 March 1958, completed 11 July 1958.
- SS New Mexico, oil tanker for Texaco Oil Co, launched 20 March 1958, completed 13 September 1958.
- MV Tri-Ellis, phosphate carrier for British Phosphate Carriers, launched 15 May 1958, completed 31 October 1958.
- MV Wakefield, coaster for Associated Humber Lines, launched 19 May 1958, completed 8 October 1958.
- INS Trishul, Whitby-class frigate for Indian Navy, launched 18 June 1958, completed 14 January 1960.
- MV Minchbank, cargo ship for Bank Line, launched 19 June 1958, completed 25 September 1958.
- SS Carrigan Head, cargo ship for Ulster Steamship Co, launched 2 July 1958, completed 18 November 1958.
- HMS Oakington, Ton-class minesweeper, launched 3 July 1958, completed 11 February 1959 for South African Navy, commissioned as SAS Mosselbaai.
- MV King Henry, cargo ship for King Line, launched 15 August 1958, completed 5 December 1958.
- MV Bulimba, cargo ship for British India Steam Navigation Co, launched 25 September 1958, completed 26 March 1959.
- HMS Advice, Confiance-class tug for British Admiralty, launched 16 October 1958, completed 17 June 1959.
- HMS Dumbleton, Ton-class minesweeper, launched 8 November 1958, completed 10 July 1958. Commissioned into South African Navy as SAS Port Elizabeth.
- SS British Statesman, oil tanker for British Tanker Co, launched 27 November 1958, completed 18 April 1959.
- MV Leeds, coaster for Associated Humber Lines, launched 2 December 1958, completed 16 April 1959.
- HMS Packington, Ton-class minesweeper, launched 10 December 1958, completed 21 May 1959. Commissioned into South African Navy as SAS Walvisbaai.
- SS Manchester Miller, cargo ship for Manchester Liners Ltd, launched 12 December 1958, completed 19 March 1959.
- MV Rosebank, cargo ship for Bank Line, launched 30 December 1958, completed 3 April 1959.
- MV Bankura, cargo ship for British India Steam Navigation Co, launched 22 January 1959, completed 27 August 1959.
- MV Ashbank, cargo ship for bank Line, launched 27 January 1959, completed 2 May 1959.
- MV Ulster Star, refrigerated cargo ship for Blue Star Line, launched 26 February 1959, completed 3 July 1959, scrapped 1979.
- MV Somers Isle, cargo ship for PSNC, launched 9 April 1959, completed 10 July 1959.
- MV Eskfield, oil tanker for Hunting & Sons, launched 21 May 1959, completed 22 December 1959.
- SS British Power, oil tanker for British Tanker Co, launched 22 May 1959, completed 15 November 1959.
- MV Pinebank, cargo ship for Bank Line, launched 5 June 1959, completed 24 September 1959.
- RMS Amazon, passenger ship for Royal Mail Line, launched 7 July 1959, completed 31 December 1959, maiden voyage January 1960.
- MV York, coaster for Associated Humber Lines, launched 8 July 1959, completed 14 November 1959.
- MV Aragon, cargo liner for Royal Mail Lines, launched 20 October 1959, completed 12 April 1960, maiden voyage 29 April 1960.
- MV British Mallard, oil tanker for British Tanker Co, launched 3 November 1959, completed 6 May 1960.
- HMS Berwick, Rothesay-class frigate for British Admiralty, launched 15 December 1959, completed 9 June 1961, sunk as target 1986.
- MV British Gull, oil tanker for British tanker Co, launched 29 December 1959, completed 29 April 1960.
- MV Elmbank, cargo ship for Bank Line, launched 29 December 1959, completed 28 April 1960.
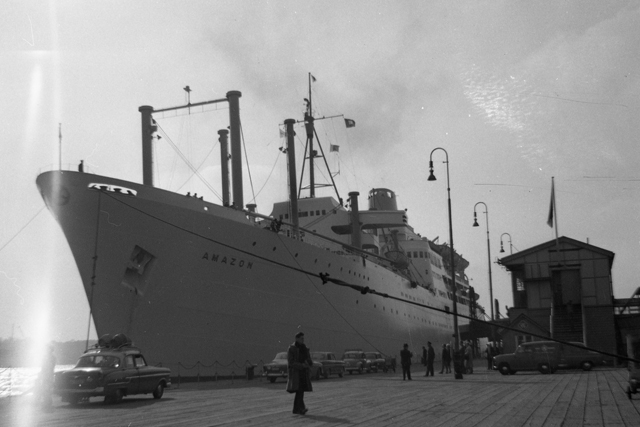
Amazon

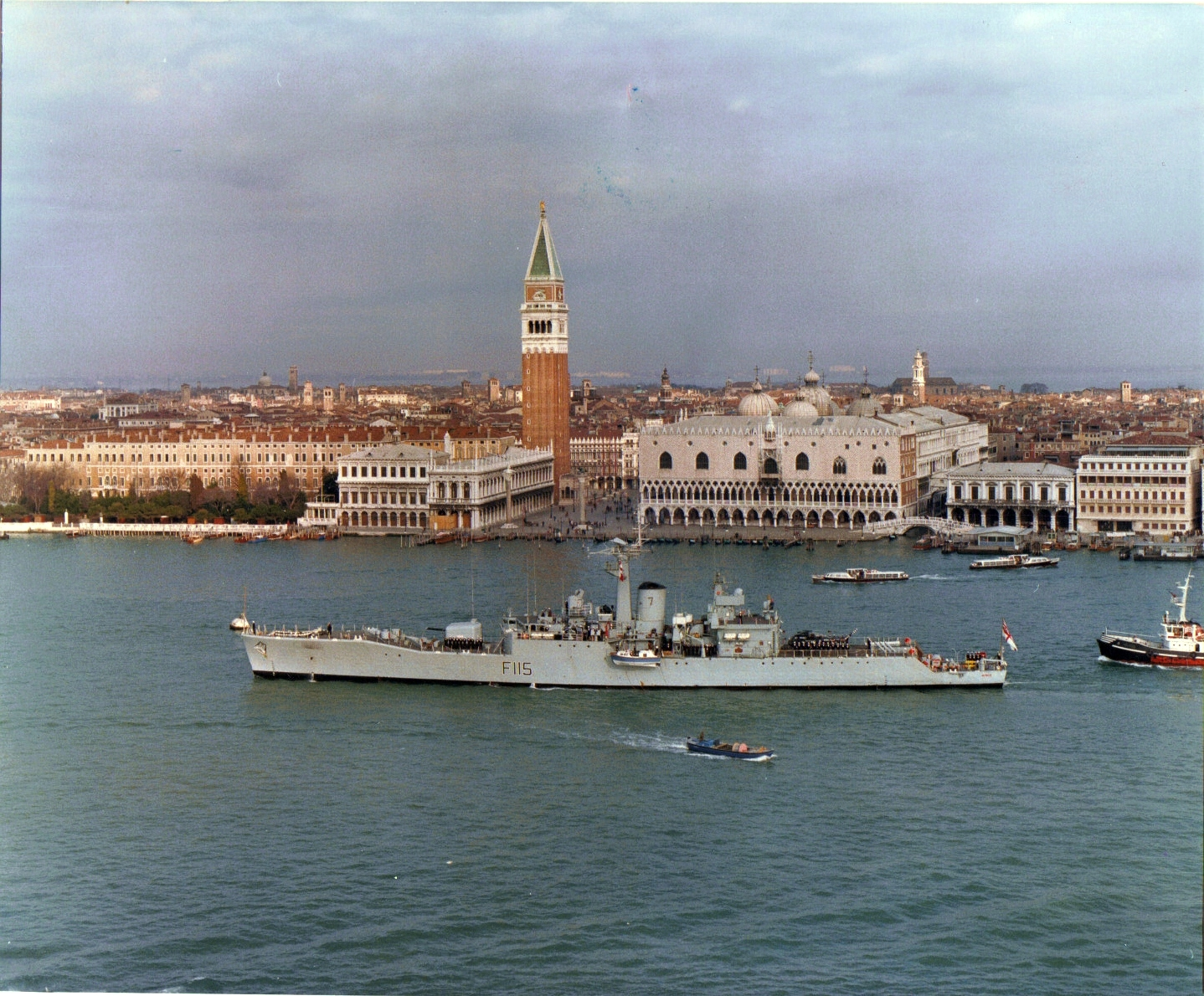
HMS Berwick

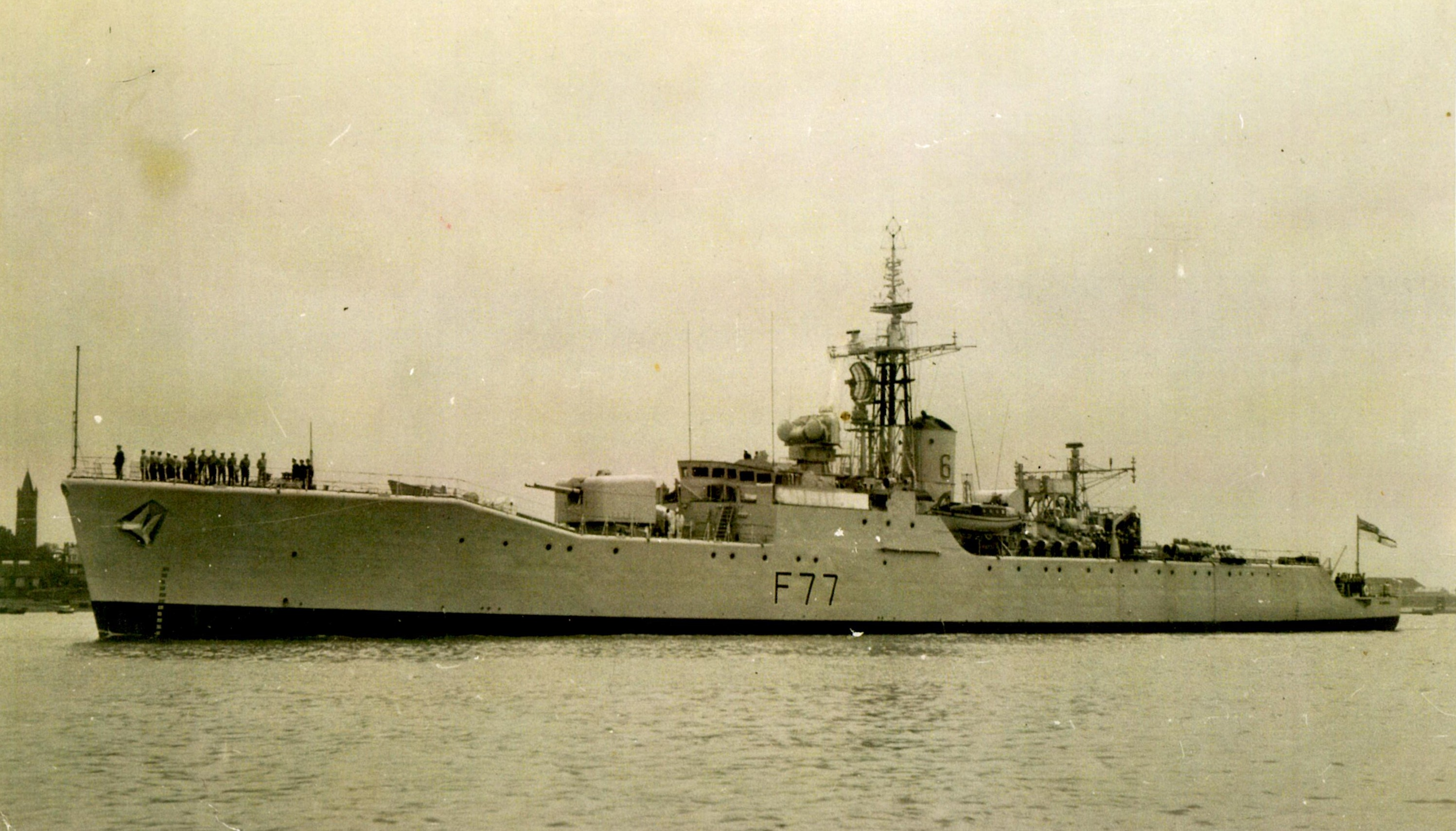
HMS Blackpool

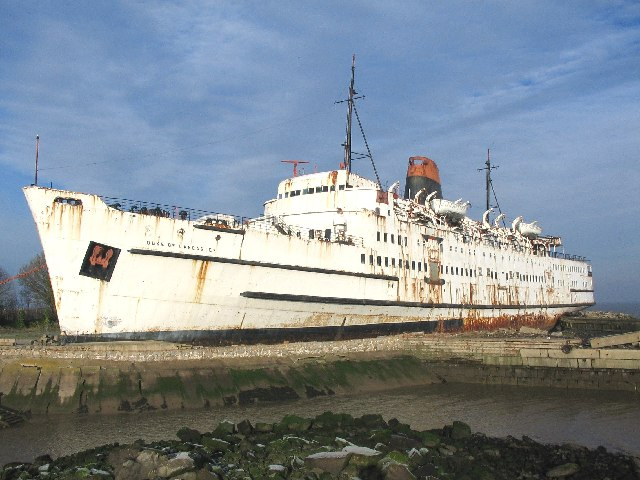
Duke of Lancaster

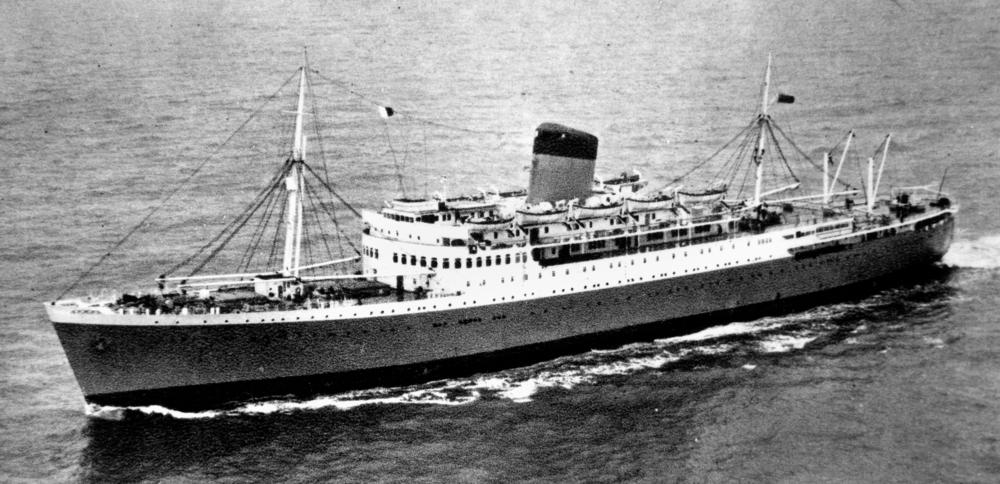
Kenya Castle

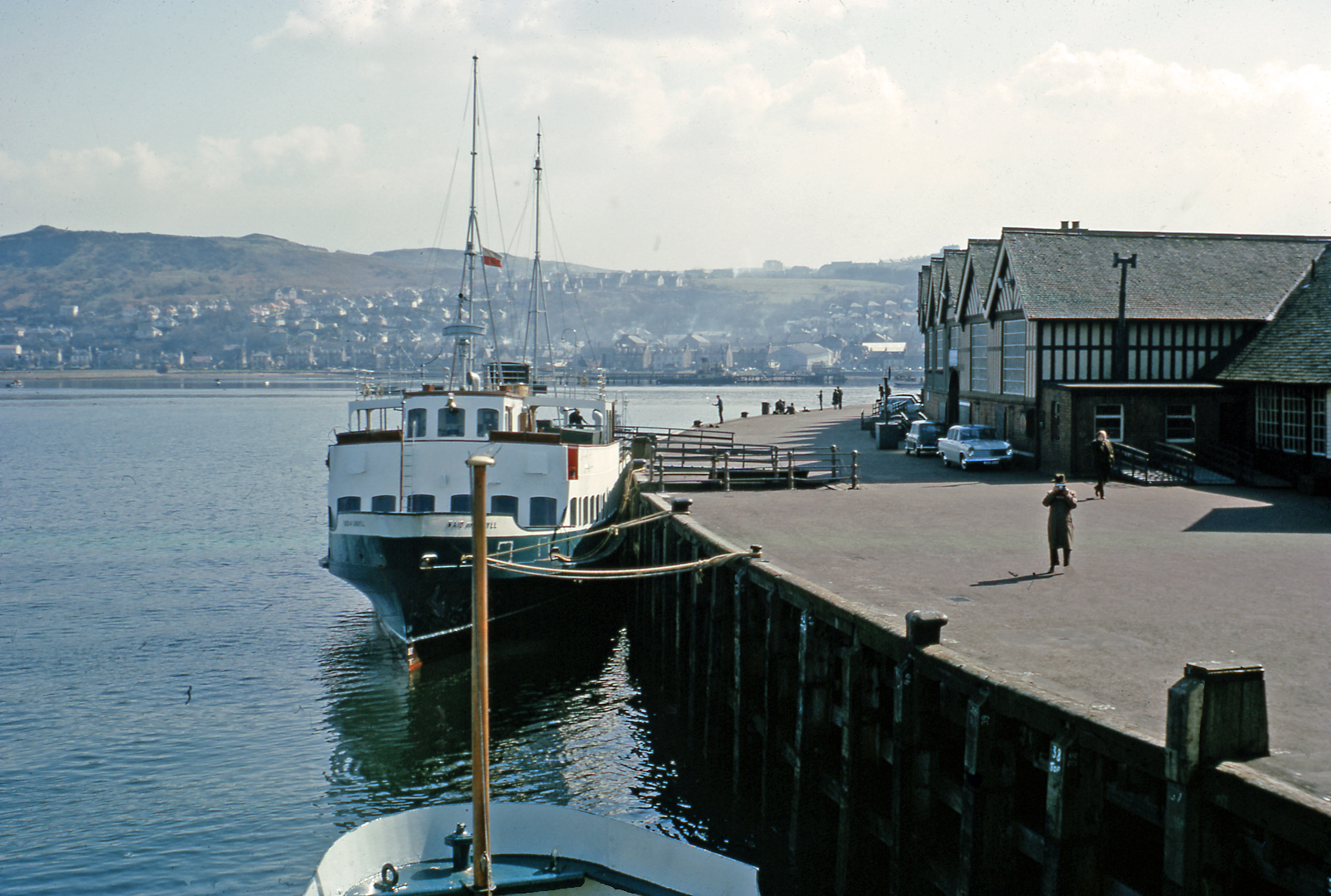
Maid of Argyll

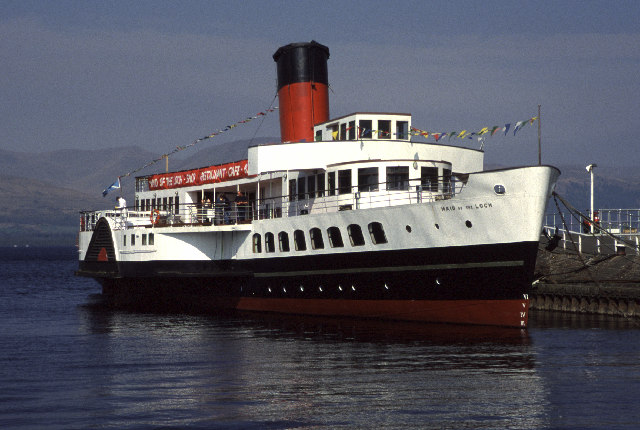
Maid of the Loch

Pendennis Castle

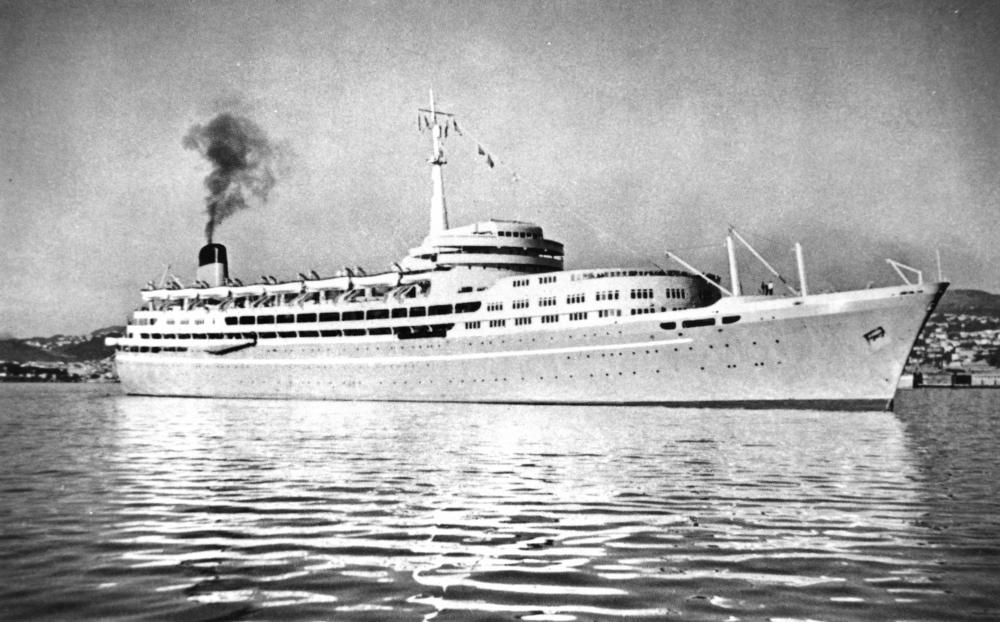
Southern Cross

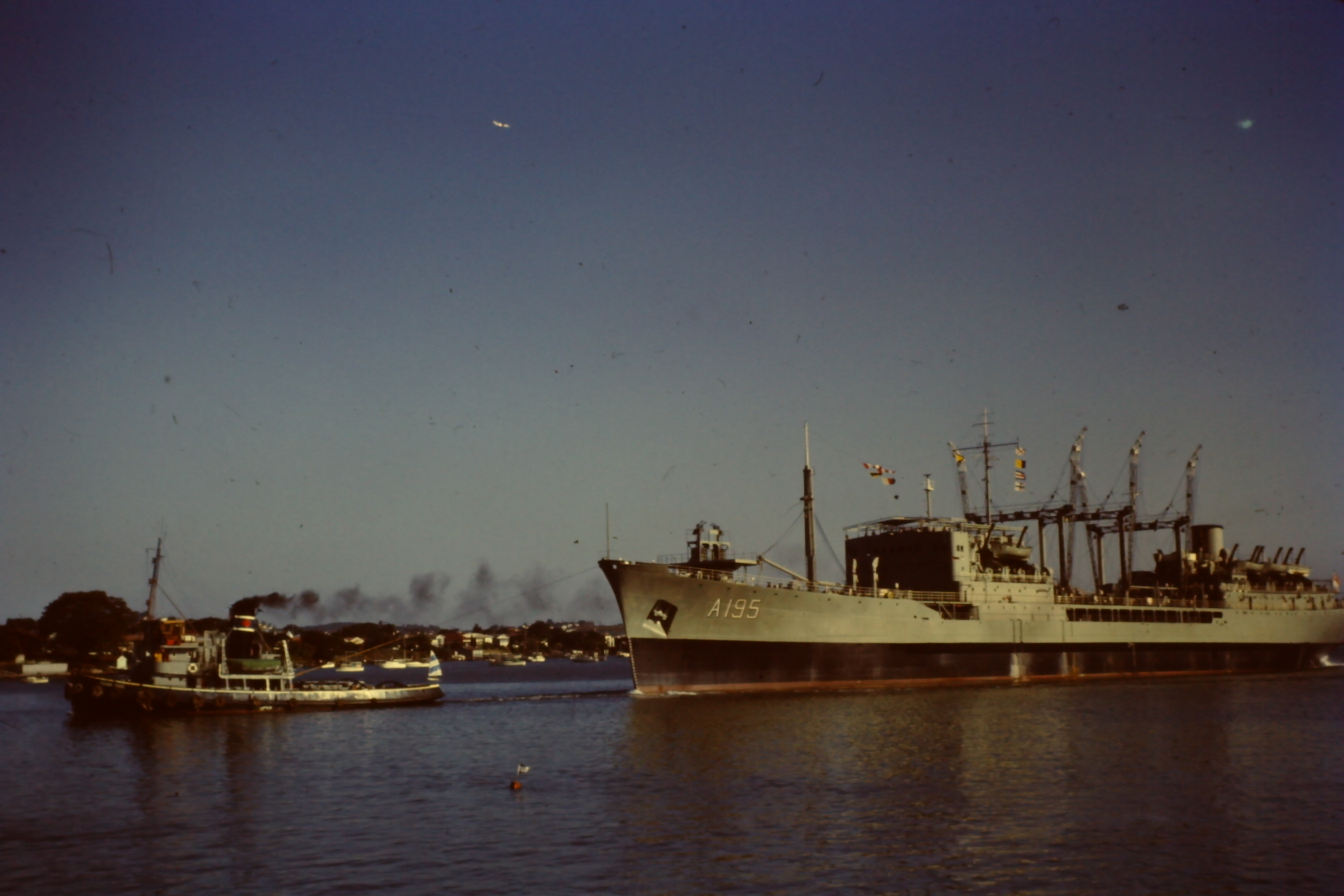
HMAS Supply (launched as RFA Tide Austral)

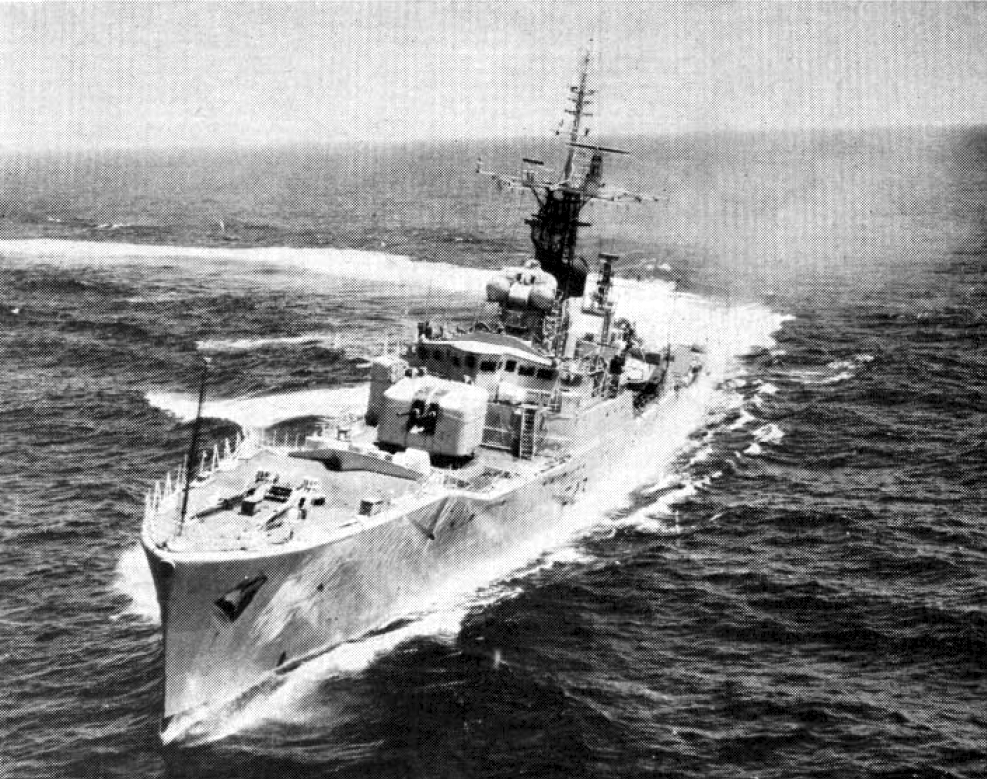
HMS Torquay

== 1960s ==
- SS William Wheelwright, oil tanker for PSNC, launched 15 January 1960, completed 1 July 1960.
- MV Tresfonn, bulk carrier for Sigval Bergsen, launched 1 March 1960, completed 11 June 1960.
- MV Barpeta, cargo ship for British India Steam Navigation Co, launched 10 March 1960, completed 19 September 1960.
- SS Canberra, launched 16 March 1960, completed 19 May 1961, maiden voyage 6 June 1961, scrapped 1997.
- MV Arlanza, Refrigerated cargo liner for Royal Mail Lines, launched 13 April 1960, completed 23 September 1960, maiden voyage 7 October 1960.
- MV Daghestan, ore carrier for Hindustan Shipping Co, launched 25 May 1960, completed 1 November 1960.
- MV Icenic, refrigerated cargo ship for Shaw Savill Line, launched 23 June 1960, completed 19 December 1960.
- SS Edward Stevinson, oil tanker for Stevinson Hardy & Co, launched 24 August 1960, completed 27 February 1961.
- MV Bamora, cargo ship for British India Steam Navigation Co, launched 6 September 1960, completed 30 January 1961.
- MV Avonbank, cargo ship for Bank Line, launched 6 October 1960, completed 13 January 1961.
- MV Krossfon, bulk carrier for Sigval Bergsen, launched 23 November 1960, completed 8 April 1961.
- MV Clyde, launch for Clyde Navigation Trust, launched 14 December 1960, completed 13 March 1961.
- MV Norsk Drott, oil tanker for Norsk Braendselojle A/S, launched 20 December 1960, completed 28 April 1961.
- MV British Cormorant, oil tanker for British Tanker Co, launched 19 January 1961, completed 6 July 1961.
- SS Tindfonn, oil tanker for Sigval Bergsen, launched 31 January 1961, completed 30 May 1961.
- MV Port Alfred, refrigerated cargo ship for Port Line, Launched 1 March 1961, completed 8 September 1961.
- MV George Peacock, oil tanker for PSNC, launched 17 March 1961, completed 6 July 1961.
- MV Bombala, cargo ship for British India Steam Navigation Co, launched 29 March 1961, completed 28 August 1961.
- MV Levernbank, cargo ship for Bank Line, launched 28 April 1961, completed 11 August 1961.
- MV Port St Lawrence, refrigerated cargo ship for Port Line, launched 31 May 1961, completed 20 October 1961.
- HMS Leander, Leander-class frigate for British Admiralty, launched 28 June 1961, completed 28 March 1963, sunk as target 1989.
- MV British Osprey, oil tanker for British Tanker Co, launched 24 August 1961, completed 12 January 1962.
- MV Cressington, dredger for British Transport Commission, launched 24 August 1961, completed 4 April 1962.
- HMS Kent, County-class destroyer for British Admiralty, launched 27 September 1961, completed 17 August 1963, scrapped 1998.
- MV Springbank, cargo ship for Bank Line, launched 26 October 1961, completed 26 January 1962.
- MV British Merlin, oil tanker for British Tanker Co, launched 23 November 1961, completed 19 May 1962.
- MV Olivebank, cargo ship for Bank Line, launched 21 December 1961, completed 12 April 1962.
- MV British Cygnet, oil tanker for British Tanker Co, launched 9 January 1962, completed 7 June 1962.
- SS Regent Liverpool, oil tanker for Texaco Oil Co, launched 5 April 1962, completed 23 November 1962.
- MV Port Nicholson, refrigerated cargo ship for Port Line, launched 4 May 1962, completed 9 November 1962.
- MV Aigburth, dredger for British Transport Commission, launched 17 May 1962, completed 29 March 1963.
- MV Ringwood, cargo ship for Ringals Rederi A/S, launched 31 May 1962, completed 29 September 1962.
- MV Belisland, cargo ship for Belships Co, launched 26 September 1962, completed 23 January 1963.
- SS British Lancer, oil tanker for British Tanker Co, launched 28 September 1962, completed 28 June 1963.
- MV Lossiebank, cargo ship for Bank Line, launched 25 January 1963, completed 3 July 1963.
- MV Roybank, cargo ship for Bank Line, launched 21 June 1963, completed 31 October 1963.
- SS Rimfonn, oil tanker for Sigval Bergsen, launched 19 August 1963, completed 18 December 1963.
- SS Methane Progress, LNG carrier for Methane Tanker Finance Co, launched 19 September 1963, completed 26 May 1964.
- HMS Fearless, assault ship for British Admiralty, launched 19 December 1963, completed 27 November 1965, scrapped 2007.
- MV Weybank, cargo ship for Bank Line, launched 31 December 1963, completed 26 March 1964.
- MV Hazelbank, cargo ship for Bank Line, launched 27 January 1964, completed 20 May 1964.
- MV Irisbank, cargo ship for Bank Line, launched 25 June 1964, completed 9 September 1964.
- SS Texaco Maracaibo, oil tanker for Texaco (Panama) Inc., launched 6 August 1964, completed 14 January 1965.
- MV British Vine, oil tanker for British tanker Co, launched 23 September 1964, completed 26 March 1965.
- MV Edenfield, oil tanker for Eden Tankers Ltd, launched 5 March 1965, completed 2 July 1967.
- HMNZS Waikato, Leander-class frigate for Royal New Zealand Navy, launched 18 February 1965, completed 19 September 1966, scuttled 2000.
- MV British Centaur, oil tanker for British Tanker Co, launched 15 June 1965, completed 11 January 1966.
- MV La Estancia, bulk carrier for Buries Marks Ltd, launched 30 June 1965, completed 30 September 1965.
- MV La Sierra, bulk carrier for Buries Marks Ltd, launched 24 November 1965, completed 12 February 1966.
- MV Ellen May, motor barge for Scott (Toombridge) Ltd, launched 1965.
- MV Orcoma, oil tanker for Shell International Marine, launched 25 January 1966, completed 30 March 1966.
- RFA Regent, fleet oiler for British Admiralty, launched 9 March 1966, completed 6 June 1967, scrapped 1993.
- MV Nairnbank, cargo ship for Bank Line, launched 6 May 1966, completed 7 July 1966.
- MV Donax, oil tanker for Shell International Marine, launched 5 July 1966, completed 16 December 1966.
- MV Ulster Prince, ferry for Coast Lines, launched 13 October 1966, completed 6 April 1967.
- MV Fjordaas, bulk carrier for Norwegian Bulk Carriers, launched 25 April 1967, completed 29 August 1967.
- MV Maplebank, cargo ship for Bank Line, launched 24 May 1967, completed 15 August 1967.
- SS Myrina, supertanker for Deutsche Shell AG, launched 6 September 1967, completed 24 April 1968.
- MV Essi Kristine, bulk carrier for Norwegian Bulk Carriers, launched 21 November 1967, completed 1 March 1968.
- MV Gowanbank, cargo ship for Bank Line, launched 1 December 1967, completed 30 January 1968.
- HMS Charybdis, Leander-class frigate for British Admiralty, launched 28 February 1968, completed 6 June 1969, sunk as target 1993.
- MV Thara, bulk carrier for Norwegian Bulk Carriers, launched 14 May 1968, completed 28 August 1968.
- MV Skaufast, bulk carrier for Norwegian Bulk Carriers, launched 9 August 1968, completed 29 October 1968.
- MV Aino, bulk carrier for CH Sorensen, launched 18 March 1969, completed 16 May 1969.
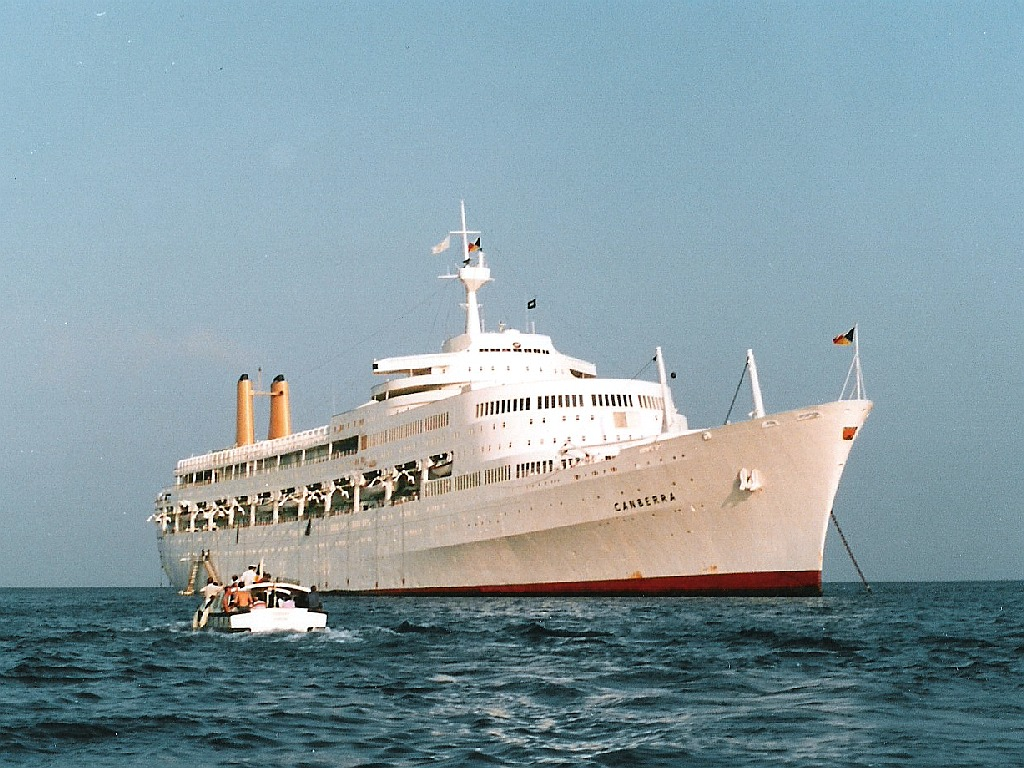
Canberra

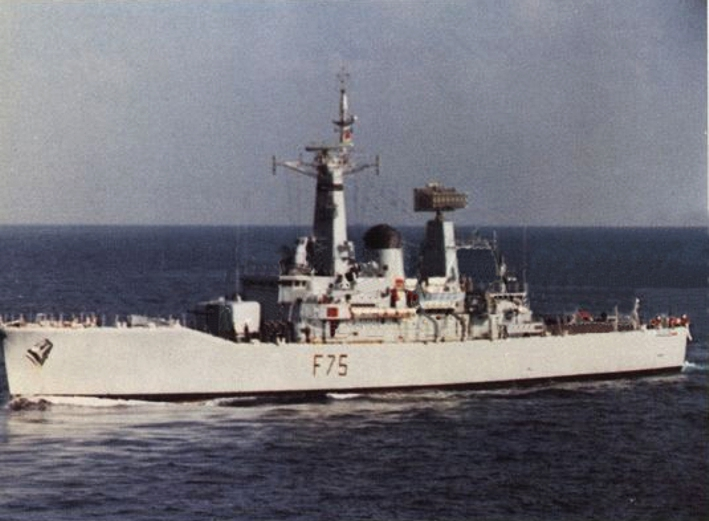
HMS Charybdis

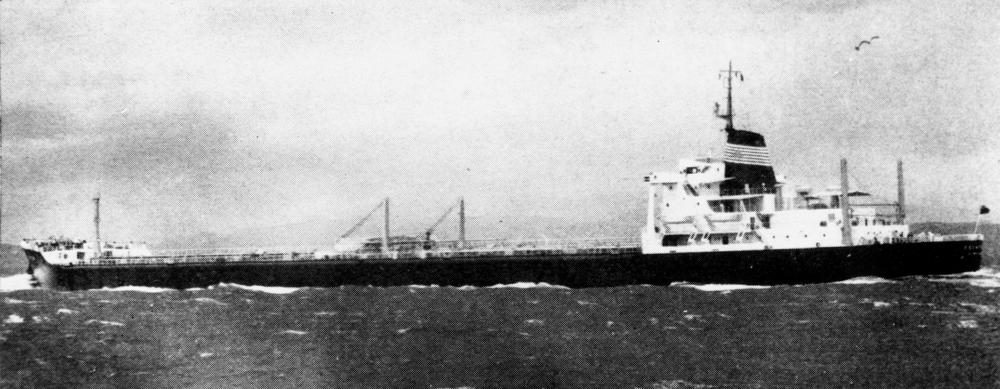
Edenfield

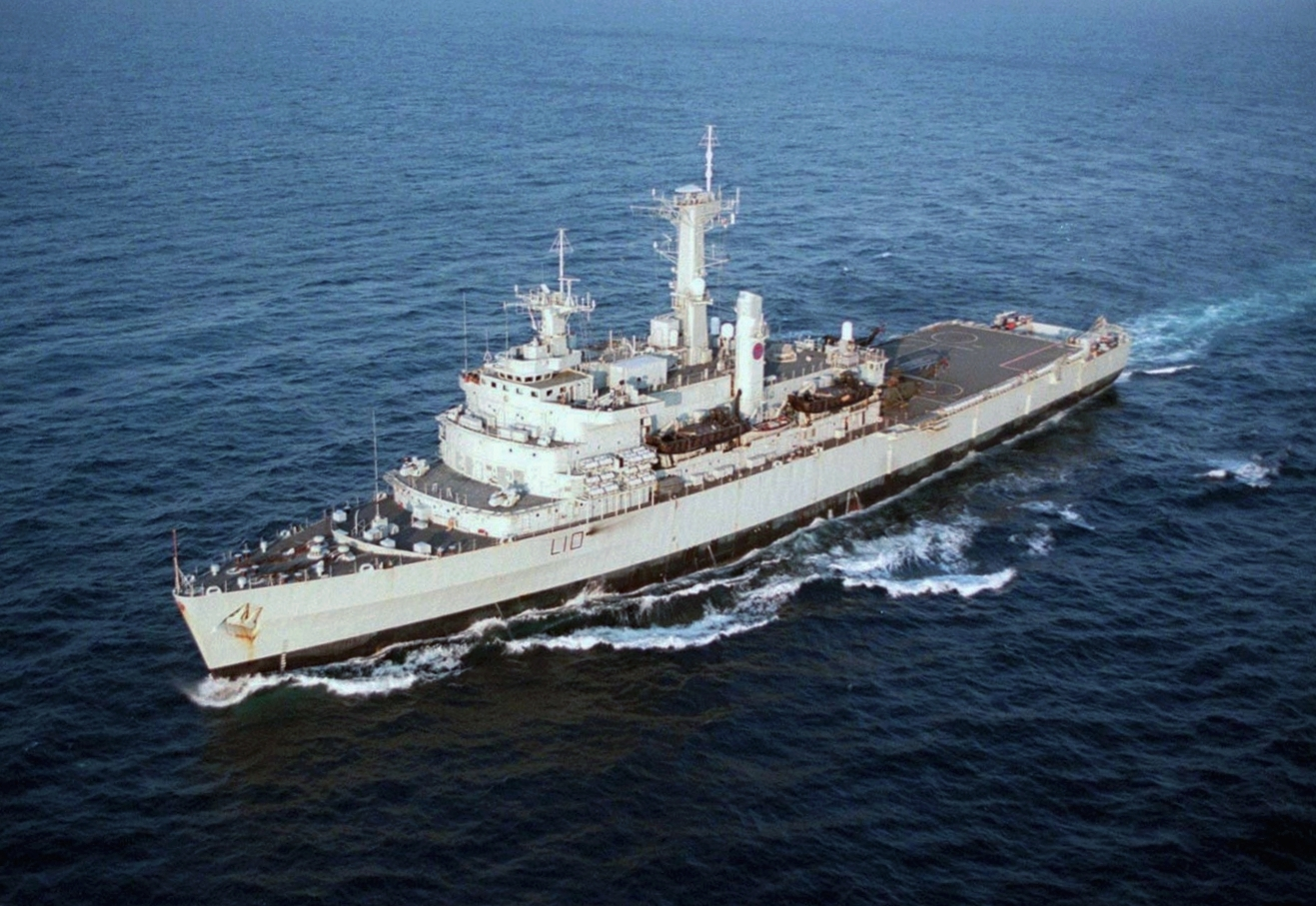
HMS Fearless

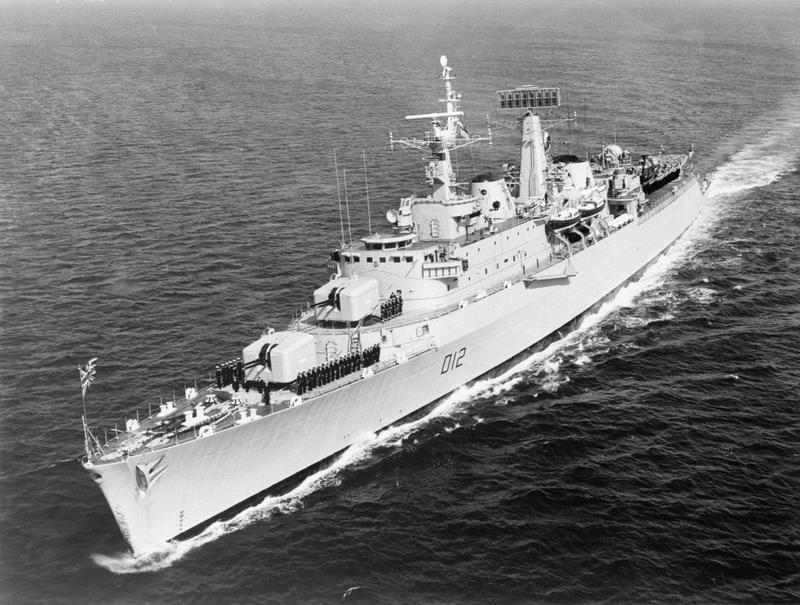
HMS Kent

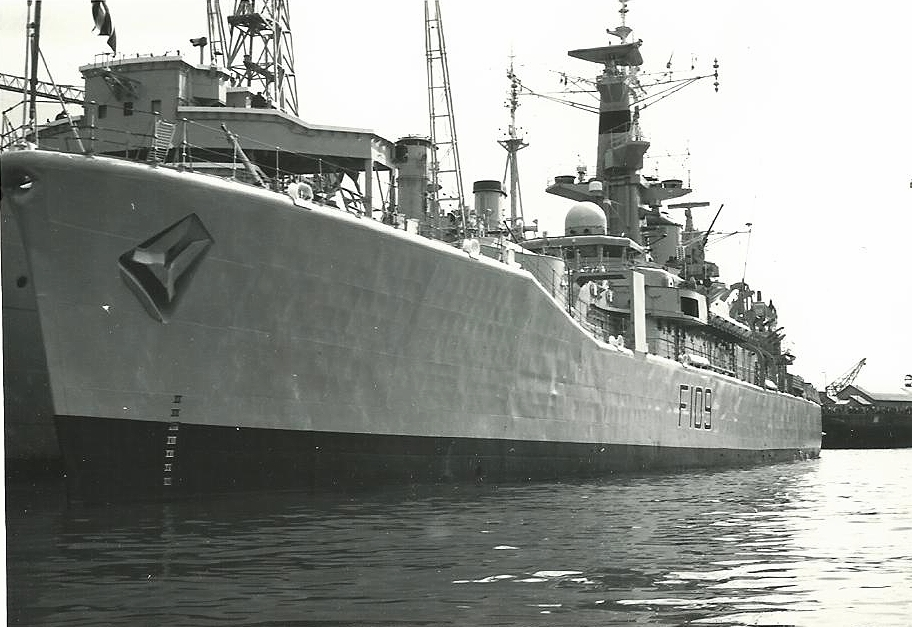
HMS Leander

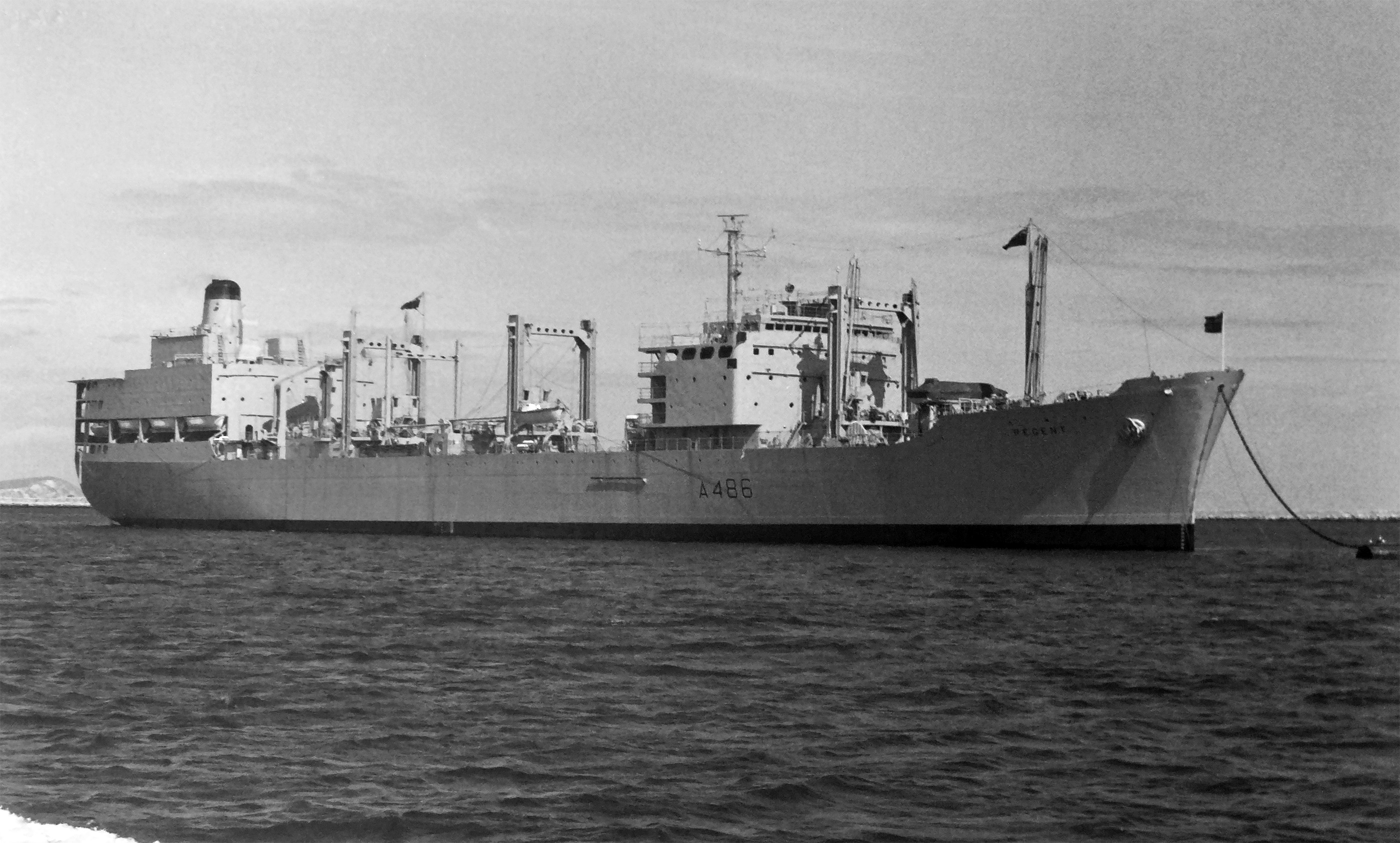
RFA Regent

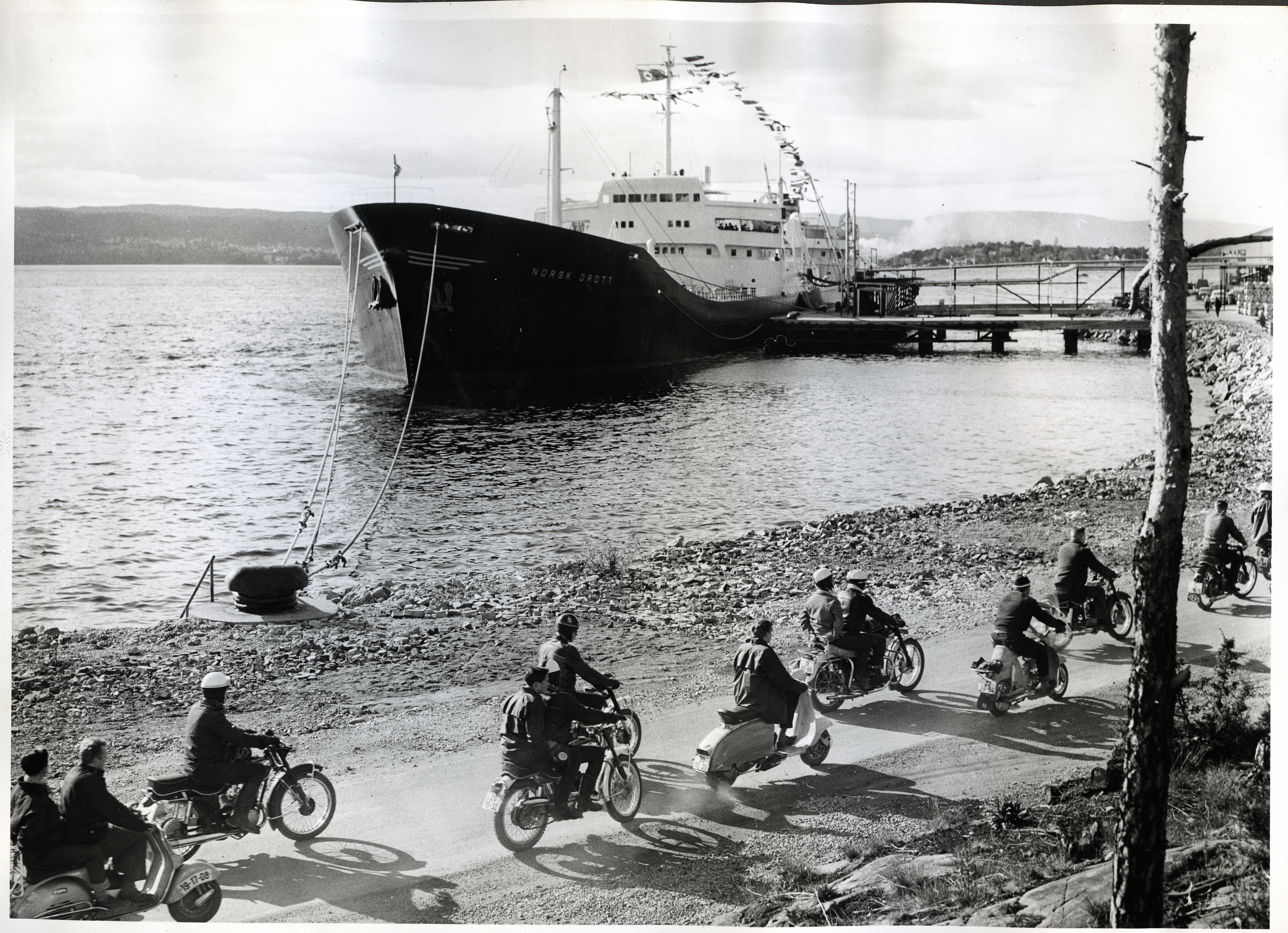
Norske Drott

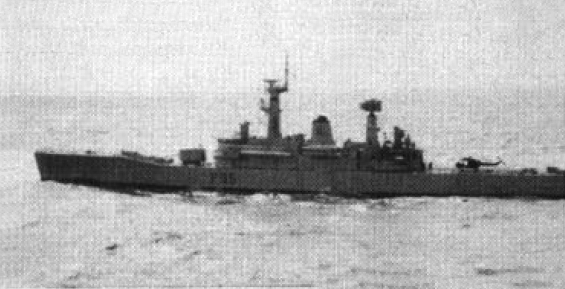
HMNZS Waikato

== 1970s ==
- MV La Pampa, bulk carrier for Buries Marks Ltd, launched 22 January 1970, completed 13 May 1970.
- MV Bulk Eagle, bulk carrier for Kriship Shipping Co, launched 6 May 1970, completed 14 September 1970.
- SS Esso Ulidia, oil tanker for Esso Petroleum Co, launched 11 May 1970, completed 6 October 1970.
- MV Sydney Bridge, bulk carrier for Bowring Shipping Ltd, launched 2 June 1970, completed 10 September 1970.
- MV Rudby, bulk carrier for Ropner Shipping, launched 11 December 1960, completed 1 March 1971.
- SS Esso Caledonia, oil tanker for Esso Petroleum Co, launched 29 May 1971, completed 6 September 1971.
- MV Iron Somersby, bulk carrier for Ropner Shipping, launched 8 October 1971, completed 7 December 1971.
- MV Barbro, bulk carrier for Mascot A/S, launched 18 December 1971, completed 18 February 1972.
- MV Belinda, bulk carrier for Mascot A/S, launched 26 April 1972, completed 30 June 1972.
- SS Olympic Banner, supertanker for Carlow Maritime Panama, launched 7 October 1972, completed 24 November 1972.
- SS Olympic Brilliance, oil tanker for Lakeport Navigation Co, launched 4 August 1973, completed 7 September 1973.
- MV Mount Newman, bulk carrier for Furness Withy, launched 1 October 1973, completed 16 November 1973.
- SS World Cavalier, supertanker for Worldwide Shipping Co, launched 23 March 1974, completed 12 June 1974.
- MV Canadian Bridge, bulk carrier for Bibby Shipping, launched 6 October 1974, completed 29 November 1974.
- SS Lotorium, supertanker for Shell Tankers Ltd, launched 13 December 1974, completed 27 February 1975.
- SS Lampas, supertanker for Shell Tankers Ltd, launched 5 July 1975, completed 17 November 1975.
- MV Essi Camilla, bulk carrier for Ruud Pedersen A/S, launched 8 October 1975, completed 5 January 1976.
- SS Lepeta, supertanker for Shell Tankers Ltd, launched 27 January 1976, completed 26 July 1976.
- SS Leonia, supertanker for Shell Tankers Ltd, launched 2 July 1976, completed 30 December 1976.
- SS Lima, supertanker for Shell Tankers Ltd, launched 11 December 1976, completed 3 June 1977.
- MV Lackenby, bulk carrier for Ropner Shipping, launched 21 March 1977, completed 5 July 1977.
- SS Coastal Corpus Christi, supertanker for Woodstock Shipping Co, launched 18 June 1977, completed 25 March 1980.
- SS Coastal Hercules, supertanker for Pomona Shipping Co, launched 27 January 1978, completed 25 March 1980.
- MV Appleby, bulk carrier for Ropner Shipping, launched 24 June 1978, completed 31 October 1978.
- MV Hornby Grange, products tanker for Furness Withy, launched 6 October 1978, completed 20 June 1979.
- MV Elstree Grange, products tanker for Furness Withy, launched 27 January 1979, completed 24 October 1979.
- MV Galloway Princess, ferry for Sealink, launched 24 May 1979, completed 22 April 1980.
- MV Ravenscraig, bulk carrier for British Steel Corporation, launched 7 September 1979, completed 14 December 1979.
- MV St Anselm, ferry for Sealink, launched 5 December 1979, completed 16 October 1980.
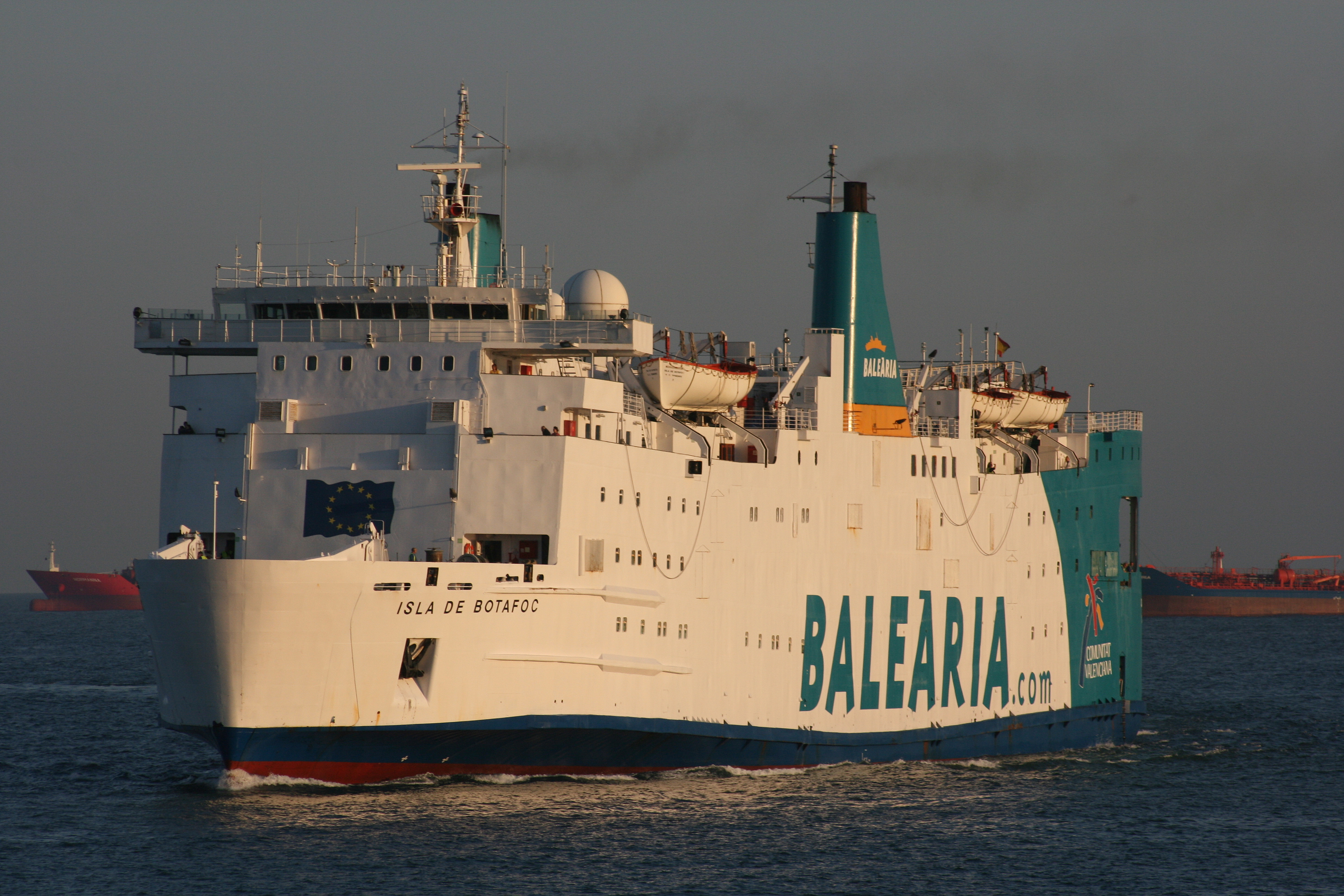
Isla de Botafoc (launched as St. Anselm)

== 1980s ==
- MV St Christopher, ferry for Sealink, launched 20 March 1980, completed 6 March 1981.
- MV St David, ferry for Sealink, launched 25 September 1980, completed 24 July 1981.
- MV Isomeria, LPG carrier for Shell Tankers Ltd, launched 21 March 1981, completed 30 April 1982.
- MV Isocardia, LPG carrier for Shell Tankers Ltd, launched 23 January 1982, completed 29 October 1982.
- MV British Skill, oil tanker for British Petroleum, launched 3 July 1982, completed 26 April 1983.
- MV British Success, oil tanker for British Petroleum, launched 28 March 1983, completed 14 February 1984.
- MV British Steel, bulk carrier for British Steel Corporation, launched 28 January 1984, completed 19 October 1984.
- MV English Star, refrigerated cargo ship for Blue Star Line, launched 23 September 1984, completed 7 January 1986.
- MV Scottish Star, refrigerated cargo ship for Blue Star Line, launched 23 September 1984, completed 2 April 1985.
- MV Auckland Star, refrigerated cargo ship for Blue Star Line, launched 4 March 1985, completed 21 January 1986.
- MV Canterbury Star, refrigerated cargo ship for Blue Star Line, launched 1 July 1985, completed 4 February 1986.
- MV Ironbridge, bulk carrier for British Steel Corporation, completed 23 September 1987.
- SS Seillean SWOPS ship for BP Petroleum Development, completed 1987.
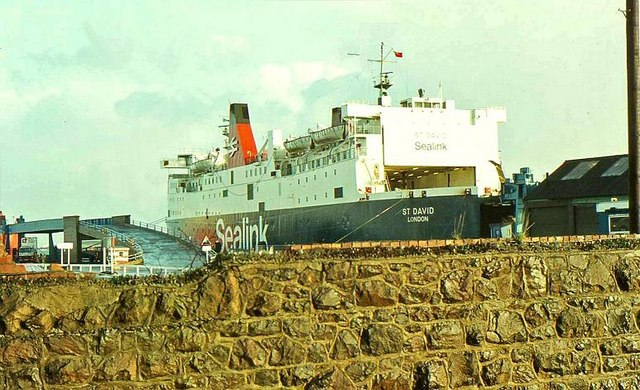
St. David

== 1990s ==
- RFA Fort Victoria, Fleet replenishment ship for British Admiralty, launched 12 June 1990, completed 24 June 1994.
- MV Knock Allen, Suezmax tanker for Fred Olsen & Co, completed 3 January 1992.
- MV Knock Adoon, Suezmax tanker for Fred Olsen & Co, launched 30 April 1992, completed 10 July 1992.
- MV Knock Stocks, Suezmax tanker for Fred Olsen & Co, launched 10 October 1992, completed 15 January 1993.
- MV Knock Clune, Suezmax tanker for Fred Olsen & Co, launched 5 June 1993, completed 30 June 1993.
- MV Erradale, bulk carrier for China Navigation Company, launched 20 January 1994, completed 5 April 1994.
- MV Knock Dun, Suezmax tanker for Fred Olsen & Co, launched 11 June 1994, completed 21 October 1994.
- Lowlands Trassey, bulk carrier for Trassey Shipping (Fred Olsen), launched 28 April 1995, completed 12 May 1995.
- Knock Muir, Suezmax tanker for Fred Olsen & Co, launched 8 January 1996, completed 30 January 1996.
- MV Knock An, oil tanker for Fred Olsen & Co, launched 13 June 1996, completed 30 September 1996.
- Seillean, SWOPS vessel for British Petroleum, launched 1 August 1996, completed 1 March 1998.
- MV Glomar C.R. Luigs, ultra deep water drillship for Global Marine Ltd, launched 23 September 1999, completed 16 March 2000.
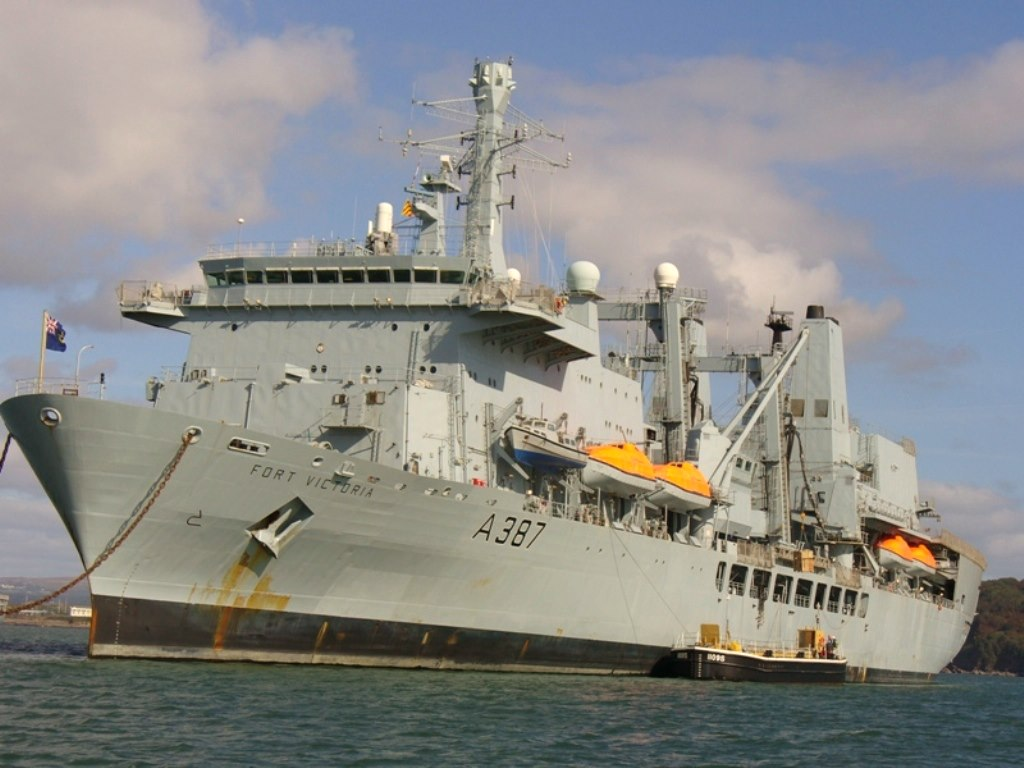
RFA Fort Victoria

== 2000s ==
- MV Glomar Jack Ryan, ultra deep water drillship for Global Marine Ltd, completed 1 August 2000.
- MV Anvil Point, ferry for Bank Line, launched 1 August 2002, completed 17 January 2003.
- MV Hartland Point, ferry for the Bank Line, launched 6 September 2002, completed 10 December 2002.

== See also ==
List of ships built by Harland & Wolff (1859–1929)
