= British Tanker Company =

British shipping company

British Tanker Company Limited
- House flag (1915-1927)
- Industry: Ship transport
- Founded: 1915
- Defunct: 1956
- Successor: BP Tanker Company
- Headquarters: London, England
- Key people: Charles Greenway
- Products: Oil
- Parent: Anglo-Persian Oil Company; Anglo Iranian Oil Company

British Tanker Company Limited was the maritime transport arm of the Anglo-Persian Oil Company, the forerunner of BP. Formed in 1915 with an initial fleet of seven oil tankers, the British Tanker Company became the BP Tanker Company in 1955.

== History ==
=== Early days ===
From the moment oil was discovered in Persia (now Iran) in May 1908, the issue arose of how best to ship it back to Britain. The Anglo-Persian Oil Company (APOC) initially employed independent contractors; principally the Asiatic Petroleum Company, a subsidiary of Shell, to carry the oil by sea. In 1912 the company acquired its first ocean going ship, the SS Ferrara, a conventional freighter that carried oil products in metal cases. Tankers were unable to berth in Abadan owing to a natural sand bar off the coast known as the Shatt-al-Arab Bar, and often had to anchor up to 40 miles from the port. This meant oil had to be lightered out to the ships. Accordingly, APOC made two further shipping purchases, a barge Friesland and a tug Sirdar-i-Naphte. This situation remained until the mid 1920s when the bar was eventually dredged to allow ships direct access to the port.

=== 1915 to 1945 ===
British Emperor, launched in 1916

However, the directors of APOC soon decided it would be better for the company to possess its own fleet of tankers. It set up the British Tanker Company Limited (BTC) in April 1915, with an initial capital of £100,000. The BTC placed orders with two Tyneside based shipbuilders, Armstrong Whitworth and Swan Hunter, for a total of seven steam-powered oil tankers. The names of the first ships bore the prefix British, and most future additions to the fleet followed the same naming convention. This acknowledged the fact that the British government had invested heavily in the fledgling company to ensure a supply of fuel oil for the Royal Navy.

BTC's first tanker was the 3,663 grt British Emperor, launched in 1916. She was employed to take oil from Abadan to the ports of Bombay, Karachi, Madras and Calcutta. She was the only BTC vessel not to be chartered by the Admiralty in World War I. Her career eventually ended in 1941, when she was sunk by the Pinguin, after evading all the Pinguin's attempts to capture her intact.

BTC's share capital was doubled to £200,000 in 1916, and further increased to £3,000,000 in November 1917.

In 1917 APOC made a successful offer to the British government for the assets of the former German-owned Benzin und Petroleum BP AG seized on the outbreak of war. This included the associate Petroleum Steamship Company (PSSC) whose 13 oil tankers passed into BTC ownership. The same year BTC was chosen by the Royal Navy to manage seven Royal Fleet Auxiliary tankers, giving it management experience that proved valuable post-war. The PSSC, now a subsidiary of BTC, took over ownership of the locally manned and managed fleet of small craft operating at Abadan.

By 1919 the fleet had grown to 25 ships, a motley collection of new and second hand vessels including the Scandinavia, the only sailing ship ever operated by BTC.

Over the next decade, the demand for oil grew throughout the industrialised world, and BTC expanded its fleet accordingly. By 1924 the fleet numbered 60 vessels. The 60th ship was the new flagship, the 6,998 grt British Aviator. She was the BTC's first diesel engined oil tanker, and was at that time the most powerful single-screw motor ship in the world. A significant event was the signing of a contract with P&O in 1923 to supply bunkering facilities for the latter's ships.

The cargoes carried by BTC ships consisted of both crude oil and refined oil products; the main refined products being fuel oil, benzine and kerosine. During the 1920s the principal destination for BTC was the United Kingdom, which accounted for around half of all cargoes discharged. Twice as much crude oil was delivered to the United Kingdom as refined products, with most of the crude oil being taken to the newly established refineries at Llandarcy and Grangemouth. The next largest destination for BTC was India, receiving 14% of the total cargoes carried. Cargoes discharged in Europe increased steadily, and by 1928 accounted for 13% of the total. In 1928 BTC's fleet consisted of 80 seagoing tankers, five coastal vessels and four government owned steamers, with a further 13 seagoing tankers being chartered by the BTC.

==== The Depression ====
With the onset of the Great Depression in the early 1930s, the merchant navies around the world faced increasing unemployment. However, through a number of strategic mergers, as well as the continuing support of the Shah of Iran, APOC managed to strengthen its position within the industry, and the BTC's fleet continued to grow until the launch of British Energy in 1931 marked the end of the post-war fleet renewal. In 1932, APOC reached an agreement with Royal Dutch Shell to combine their UK domestic marketing and distribution networks. This involved the transfer of some ships to a jointly owned company, Shell-Mex & BP. With careful management BTC only laid up six ships for an average of six weeks between 1930 and 1935. In 1935, with the Depression receding, the company started placing orders with British shipyards for a further 24 ships. The same year, at the Shah's request, the company was renamed the Anglo-Iranian Oil Company.

==== Second World War ====
With the outbreak of the Second World War in 1939, the British government chartered BTC's whole fleet of 93 vessels to transport fuel for its armed forces. In addition the company was made responsible for the management of requisitioned ships and American assistance tonnage. By 1942 the company had 146 ships under its control. The fleet lost 44 of its own ships and six managed ships sunk during the war, many during the Battle of the Atlantic and the Mediterranean U-Boat campaign, with two others so badly damaged they could only be used as storage hulks. In addition two ex-BTC tankers operated by Italian companies were sunk by British submarines while a third was sunk by RAF Coastal Command.

=== 1945 to 1955 ===
Within two years of peace in 1945, BTC had restored its fleet to its pre-war total of 93 ships. This included the purchase of 10 American wartime T2 tankers and three ex merchant aircraft carriers. The recovery was further bolstered by the building of 57 new tankers, each of 8,600 grt. These new ships increased the tonnage of oil transported from the Abadan refinery, but they remained within the limits imposed by the requirement to sail through the shallow waters of the Suez Canal. At this time the company decided that the old principle of owning 90% of its required tonnage was too onerous and that chartered vessels should be employed to make up the average 50% annual shortfall. To ease the problems of managing this large fleet an associated shipping company, the Lowland Tanker Company, was formed in association with Mathesons and Common Brothers of Newcastle to operate 10 time-chartered tankers exclusively for BTC.

In 1951 the situation changed dramatically, when Iran nationalised its oil industry. AIOC removed all its staff from the country, and for a while had no access to Iranian oil. AIOC set about forming new alliances with other oil producing countries, especially Kuwait and Bahrain. The crisis lead to a major emergency logistics operation being undertaken to reroute and repurpose the tanker fleet to cope with the loss of the refining capacity at Abadan. In addition the Petroleum Steamship Company's fleet of barges, tugs, lighters and ancillary craft was hastily evacuated to Basra and Kuwait.

In the early 1950s BTC began increasing the size of its deep-sea ships by building 13 so-called 'supertankers', each of 18,000 grt. These larger ships were particularly useful during the Suez Crisis of 1956, which closed the Suez Canal and forced ships to sail around the Cape of South Africa, adding 9,000 nautical miles (17,000 km) to their journey.

In November 1954 AIOC renamed itself the British Petroleum Company, and the BTC became the BP Tanker Company from 1 June 1956, British Soldier being the first ship turned out in the new company's colours.

== The ships ==
=== Fleet list 1915 to 1945 ===
Ship	Built	GRT	Photo	Built by	Notes
Aras	1893	3,210		Palmers Shipbuilding & Iron Company	Purchased 1918. Sold 1930 and renamed Lina Campanella. Scrapped in 1950.
British Admiral	1917	6,842		Swan Hunter	Scrapped in 1937.
British Advocate	1922	6,994		Sir James Laing & Sons	Captured 20 February 1941 by the Admiral Scheer and renamed Adolf, later renamed Nordstern. Sank 1944 during an air raid.
British Ambassador	1924	6,940		Sir James Laing & Sons	Scrapped in 1954.
British Architect	1922	7,388		Blythswood Shipbuilding	Scrapped in 1953.
British Ardour	1928	7,124		Palmers Shipbuilding & Iron Company	Sunk 5 April 1943 by torpedo from U-706
British Aviator	1924	6,998		Palmers Shipbuilding & Iron Company	First diesel engined vessel. Scrapped in 1953.
British Baron	1908	4,906		Armstrong Whitworth	ex PSSC Roumanian acquired 1917. Sold 1925 and renamed Norne. Resold 1928 and renamed Vincas. Scrapped in 1936.
British Beacon	1918	6,891		Workman, Clark & Co	Operated first for the Shipping Controller then after 1919 for the Admiralty. 1937 removed from management and renamed Olcades. Scrapped in 1948.
British Birch	1916	5,882		Short Brothers	Launched as RFA Oldbury, completed as RFA Birchleaf. Purchased and renamed British Birch in 1919. Scrapped in 1931.
British Bombardier	1942	8202		Harland & Wolff	Laid down as Empire Fusilier, launched as Empire Bombardier. Operated for the MoWT. Purchased 1946. Scrapped 1960.
British Bugler	1945	3,766		JL Thompson & Sons	Ex Empire Arrow operated for the MoWT. Purchased 1946. Sold 1957 and renamed Montmajour. Resold 1963 and renamed Mantinia. Scrapped in 1981.
British Captain	1923	6,968		Palmers Shipbuilding & Iron Company	Sunk 2 December 1941 by mine
British Cavalier	1942	9,891		Sir James Laing & Sons	ex Empire Cavalier operated for the MoWT. Purchased 1945. Scrapped in 1959.
British Chancellor	1921	7,086		Sir James Laing & Sons	Sold 1952 and renamed Wanmas. Then sold 1954 and renamed Viva. Finally sold 1955 and renamed Gaaton. Scrapped in 1963.
British Character	1941	8,453		Swan Hunter	Scrapped in 1959.
British Chemist	1925	6,997		Palmers Shipbuilding & Iron Company	Scrapped in 1953.
British Chivalry	1929	7,118		Palmers Shipbuilding & Iron Company	Sunk 22 February 1944 by torpedo from Japanese submarine I-37
British Colonel	1921	6,999		Sir James Laing & Sons	Scrapped in 1953.
British Colony	1927	6,917		Swan Hunter	Sunk 13 May 1942 by torpedo from U-162
British Commander	1922	6,896		Caledon Shipbuilding & Engineering Company	Sunk 26 August 1940 by the Pinguin
British Commando	1942	8,194		Harland & Wolff	Ex Empire Chapman operated for the MoWT. Purchased 1946, Scrapped in 1959.
British Commerce	1922	4,205		William Beardmore & Company	Scrapped in 1937.
British Commodore	1923	6,865		Caledon Shipbuilding & Engineering Company	Scrapped in 1953.
British Confidence	1936	8,494		Cammell Laird	Renamed Anglian Confidence in 1957. Scrapped in 1958.
British Consul	1924	6,940		Sir James Laing & Sons	Sunk 19 August 1942 by torpedo from U-564
British Corporal	1922	6,972		Palmers Shipbuilding & Iron Company	Requisitioned by the MoWT in 1940 and renamed Empire Corporal. Sunk 18 August 1942 by torpedo from U-598
British Councillor	1922	7,045		Sir James Laing & Sons	Sunk 3 February 1940 by mine
British Courage	1928	6,952		Lithgows	Scrapped in 1953.
British Destiny	1937	8,470		Harland & Wolff	Renamed Gaelic Destiny in 1957. Scrapped in 1958.
British Diligence	1937	8,408		Swan Hunter	Renamed Anglian Diligence in 1957. Scrapped in 1958.
British Diplomat	1926	6,484		John Brown & Company	Requisitioned by the MoWT in 1940 and renamed Empire Diplomat. Laid up in 1944 and scrapped in 1946.
British Dominion	1928	6,983		Swan Hunter	Sunk 10 January 1943 by torpedo from U-620 while sailing in Convoy TM 1
British Dragoon	1943	9,909		Sir James Laing & Sons	ex Empire Alliance operated for the MoWT. Purchased 1945. Scrapped in 1962.
British Drummer	1944	3,758		JL Thompson & Sons	ex Empire Ensign operated for the MoWT. Purchased 1946. Sold 1957 and renamed Anella. Resold 1958 and renamed Norse Commander. Scrapped in 1966.
British Duchess	1924	5,973		JL Thompson & Sons	Sold 1952 and renamed Duchess. Scrapped in 1959.
British Duke	1899	3,645		Sir James Laing & Sons	ex PSSC Terek acquired 1917. Sold to Italy 1930 and renamed Laura Corado. Sunk 30 March 1941 by torpedo from HMS Rorqual
British Earl	1901	6,288		Armstrong Whitworth	ex PSSC Pinna acquired 1917. Sold to Italy 1929. Scuttled 1940 but refloated and taken over by the US Government. Renamed Orissa, scrapped in 1950.
British Emperor	1916	3,637		Armstrong Whitworth	First ship built for BTC. Sunk 7 May 1941 by the Pinguin
British Empress	1917	6,847		Swan Hunter	Scrapped in 1936.
British Endeavour	1927	4,580		Armstrong Whitworth	Sunk 22 February 1940 by torpedo from U-50
British Endurance	1936	8,406		Swan Hunter	1959 sold and renamed Redwijs II. Scrapped in 1959.
British Energy	1931	7,209		Greenock Dockyard Company	Damaged in an air-raid at Birkenhead in 1940. Scrapped in 1955.
British Engineer	1922	6,993		Workman, Clark & Co	Sold 1952 and renamed Emily. Resold 1954 and renamed Yarkon. Scrapped in 1959.
British Ensign	1917	7,048		Armstrong Whitworth	Scrapped in 1937.
British Enterprise	1921	4,204		William Beardmore & Company	Scrapped in 1936.
British Faith	1928	6,950		Caledon Shipbuilding & Engineering Company	Scrapped at Milford Haven in 1956
British Fame	1936	8,303		Swan Hunter	Represented the company at the 1937 Review of the Fleet off Spithead. Sunk 12 August 1940 by torpedo from Italian submarine Alessandro Malaspina
British Fern	1917	5,831		Napier & Miller	Built as Fernleaf. Purchased 1920. Scrapped in 1931.
British Fidelity	1938	8,465		Harland & Wolff	1957 renamed Gaelic Fidelity. Scrapped in 1958.
British Fortitude	1937	8,482		Cammell Laird	Damaged 23 February 1943 by torpedo from U-202, but survived. 1957 renamed Anglian Fortitude. Scrapped in 1958.
British Fortune	1930	4,696		Lithgows	Sunk 31 October 1941 by German aircraft
British Freedom	1928	6,985		Palmers Shipbuilding & Iron Company	Sunk 14 January 1945 by torpedo from U-1232
British Fusilier	1923	6,943		Swan Hunter	Scrapped in 1953.
British General	1893	3.245		Armstrong Whitworth	ex Georgian Prince acquired 1918. Sold to Spain 1922 and renamed Ebros. Scrapped 1940.
British General	1922	6,985		Palmers Shipbuilding & Iron Company	Sunk 7 October 1940 by torpedo from U-37
British Genius	1939	8,553		William Doxford & Sons	Scrapped in 1961.
British Glory	1928	6,993		Sir James Laing & Sons	Damaged 15 October 1940 by torpedo from U-138, but survived. Scrapped in 1954.
British Governor	1926	6,840		Swan Hunter	Scrapped in 1953.
British Gratitude	1942	8,463		Swan Hunter	Scrapped in 1959.
British Grenadier	1922	6,888		Swan Hunter	Sunk 22 May 1941 by torpedo from U-103
British Guardsman	1942	8,128		Swan Hunter	Ex Empire Garrick operated for the MoWT. Purchased 1945. Sold 1951 and renamed Alan Evelyn. Resold in 1955 and renamed Westbrook. Scrapped in 1960.
British Gunner	1922	6,894		Swan Hunter	Sunk 24 February 1941 by torpedo from U-97
British Harmony	1941	8,453		Swan Hunter	Scrapped in 1960.
British Holly	1917	5,162		William Hamilton & Company	Scrapped in 1931
British Honour	1928	6,991		Palmers Shipbuilding & Iron Company	1953 sold and renamed Marisin M. 1957 renamed Mario Martini. Scrapped in 1961.
British Hope	1928	6,951		Caledon Shipbuilding & Engineering Company	Scrapped in 1957.
British Hussar	1923	6,944		Swan Hunter	Scrapped in 1953.
British Industry	1927	4,297		Palmers Shipbuilding & Iron Company	Scrapped in 1953.
British Influence	1939	8,431		Swan Hunter	Sunk 14 September 1939 by torpedo and gunfire from U-29
British Integrity	1937	8,412		Harland & Wolff	1957 renamed Gaelic Integrity. Scrapped in 1958.
British Inventor	1926	7,101		Palmers Shipbuilding & Iron Company	Sunk 13 June 1940 by mine
British Isles	1917	7,108		Armstrong Whitworth	Scrapped in 1938
British Judge	1921	6,735		Sir James Laing & Sons	Scrapped in 1953.
British Justice	1928	6,982		Palmers Shipbuilding & Iron Company	Scrapped in 1954.
British Knight	1908	4,762		Swan Hunter	ex PSSC Danubian acquired 1917. Sold 1929 and renamed Sanvik then sold again 1938 and renamed Arrivabene. Wrecked 1940.
British Lady	1923	6,098		JL Thompson & Sons	Sold to the Admiralty in 1939 and scrapped in 1946
British Lancer	1942	9,891		Sir James Laing & Sons	Ex Empire Wordsworth operated for the MoWT. Purchased 1945. Scrapped 1960.
British Lantern	1918	6,897		Workman, Clark & Co	Taken over by the Royal Fleet Auxiliary in 1937 as RFA Oligarch. Survived the War but was scuttled in the Red Sea in 1945.
British Liberty	1939	8,435		Furness Shipbuilding Company	Sunk 6 January 1940 by mine
British Light	1917	6,470		Palmers Shipbuilding & Iron Company	Managed for the Shipping Controller. 1919 transferred to the Admiralty. 1937 removed from management and renamed Olwen. Sold 1949 and renamed Mushtari. Scrapped in 1960.
British Lord	1922	6,098		JL Thompson & Sons	Scrapped in 1953.
British Loyalty	1928	6,993		Palmers Shipbuilding & Iron Company	Torpedoed and sunk by a Japanese midget submarine in Diego-Suarez on 30 May 1942. Later refloated and repaired. Sunk 9 March 1944 by torpedo from U-183, but salvaged as a hulk. Scrapped in 1946.
British Major	1913	4,147		Tyne Iron Shipbuilding Co, Newcastle	ex Roumanian Prince acquired 1918. Sold to Italy 1929 and renamed Riva Sicular. Scrapped in 1933.
British Maple	1898	8,747		CS Swan & Hunter, Wallsend	Built as Mount Royal, renamed Mapleleaf in 1916. Acquired 1919 & renamed British Maple in 1920. Hulked in 1933 and scrapped in 1935.
British Mariner	1922	6,996		Palmers Shipbuilding & Iron Company	Severely damaged 20 October 1941 by torpedo from U-126, but salvaged and used as a hulk. 1947 sold, repaired and renamed Tex-Africa. Scrapped in 1951.
British Marquis	1908	4,997		Sir James Laing & Sons	ex PSSC Servian acquired 1917. 1930 sold and renamed Conte di Misurata. Sunk by gunfire in 1941.
British Marshall	1912	4,158		Tyne Iron Shipbuilding Co, Newcastle	ex Russian Prince acquired 1918. Sold to Italy 1929 and renamed Tritone. Scrapped 1933.
British Merchant	1922	6,994		William Beardmore & Company	Scrapped in 1949.
British Merit	1942	8,093		Harland & Wolff	Damaged 25 July 1942 by torpedo from German submarine U-552, but survived. Scrapped in 1960.
British Might	1945	8,200		Harland & Wolff	Scrapped in 1961.
British Motorist	1924	6,891		Swan Hunter	Sunk 19 February 1942 by Japanese aircraft
British Officer	1922	6,990		Palmers Shipbuilding & Iron Company	Sunk 1 December 1940 by mine.
British Patience	1943	8,097		Harland & Wolff	Scrapped in 1961.
British Peer	1908	4,920		Armstrong Whitworth	ex PSSC Carpathian acquired 1917. Sold to Italy 1930 and renamed Tampico. Torpedoed 1941 and scuttled 1945.
British Petrol	1925	6,906		Swan Hunter	Sunk 14 June 1940 by the German auxiliary cruiser Widder
British Pluck	1928	1,025		Swan Hunter	Transferred to Shell-Mex & BP and renamed Shelbrit 1 in 1936. Sank after hitting a mine 19 Sep 1940
British Power	1936	8,451		Harland & Wolff	Scrapped in 1958.
British Premier	1922	5,872		Palmers Shipbuilding & Iron Company	Sunk 24 December 1940 by torpedo from U-65
British Prestige	1931	7,106		Lithgows	Scrapped in 1956.
British Pride	1931	7,106		Lithgows	Scrapped in 1955.
British Princess	1917	7,019		Armstrong Whitworth	1946 renamed British Veteran. Scrapped in 1949.
British Progress	1927	4,581		Armstrong Whitworth	Scrapped 4 November 1943 after being severely damaged by torpedo from a German E-Boat
British Promise	1942	8,443		Cammell Laird	Damaged 21 November 1942 by torpedo from U-518, but survived. Scrapped in 1959.
British Prudence	1939	8,620		Sir James Laing & Sons	Sunk 23 March 1942 by torpedo from U-754
British Purpose	1943	5,845		Furness Shipbuilding Company	Damaged 20 October 1943 by torpedo from U-532, but survived. 1959 sold and renamed Annella. Scrapped in 1961.
British Reliance	1928	7,000		Greenock Dockyard Company	Sunk 2 April 1941 by torpedo from U-46
British Renown	1928	6,997		Sir James Laing & Sons	Damaged 21 November 1942 by torpedo from U-518, but survived. Scrapped in 1954.
British Resolution	1937	8,408		Swan Hunter	Scrapped in 1959.
British Resource	1931	7,209		Greenock Dockyard Company	Sunk 15 March 1942 by torpedo from U-124
British Respect	1943	8,479		Swan Hunter	Scrapped in 1959.
British Restraint	1943	8,448		Cammell Laird	Scrapped in 1959.
British Rose	1916	6,572		Sir Raylton Dixon & Co	Ordered as the Rona but taken over on the stocks and launched as RFA Califol. Transferred to the Shipping Controller and renamed Roseleaf. Purchased 1920. Sold 1930 and renamed Portofino. Bombed and sunk by RAF aircraft in 1942.
British Sailor	1918	5,576		Swan Hunter	Ex War Rajah purchased 1920. 1951 sold and renamed Viva. Scrapped in 1954.
British Science	1931	7,138		Palmers Shipbuilding & Iron Company	Sunk 18 April 1941 by torpedo from Italian aircraft
British Scout	1922	1,507		Swan Hunter	Scrapped in 1957.
British Security	1937	8,470		Harland & Wolff	Sunk 23 May 1941 by torpedo from U-566
British Sergeant	1922	5,868		Palmers Shipbuilding & Iron Company	Sunk 9 April 1942 by Japanese aircraft
British Sincerity	1939	8,533		Cammell Laird	Scrapped in 1958.
British Soldier	1918	5,564		William Gray & Co	Ex War Sikh, purchased 1919. Sold 1952 and renamed Marina. 1954 resold and renamed Romano. 1959 resold and renamed Menora. Scrapped in 1959.
British Sovereign	1917	3,657		Armstrong Whitworth	Scrapped in 1951.
British Splendour	1931	7,138		Palmers Shipbuilding & Iron Company	Sunk 7 April 1942 by torpedo from U-552
British Star	1918	6,888		Swan Hunter	Managed for the Shipping Controller then transferred to the Admiralty in 1919. Removed from management in 1937 and renamed Olynthus. Sold to Itakl 1949 and renamed Pensilvania. Scrapped in 1959.
British Statesman	1923	6,991		Sir James Laing & Sons	Scrapped in 1963.
British Strength	1931	7,139		Palmers Shipbuilding & Iron Company	The last ship built by Palmers. Sunk 15 March 1941 by German battleship Scharnhorst or Gneisenau
British Tenacity	1939	8,439		Swan Hunter	Scrapped in 1959.
British Thrift	1928	707		Swan Hunter	Renamed Thriftie in 1935, then Shelbrit 2 in 1936. 1943 sold to Shell-Mex & BP and renamed Shell Loader. Sold 1961 and renamed Amphitrite. Scrapped 1984.
British Tommy	1921	1,411		Lithgows	Scrapped in 1946.
British Trader	1921	4,204		William Beardmore & Company	Sold in 1953 and renamed Flisvos. 1954 resold and renamed Manco Capac. Scrapped in 1961.
British Tradition	1942	8,443		Cammell Laird	Scrapped in 1961.
British Triumph	1936	8,402		Lithgows	Sunk 13 February 1940 by mine
British Trust	1939	8,466		Harland & Wolff	Sunk 1 May 1943 by torpedo from German aircraft
British Union	1927	6,987		Swan Hunter	Sunk 18 January 1941 by the Kormoran
British Unity	1939	8,407		Lithgows	Scrapped in 1961.
British Valour	1927	6,952		Lithgows	Scrapped in 1954.
British Venture	1930	4,696		Lithgows	Sunk 24 June 1943 by torpedo, from Japanese submarine I-27
British Vigilance	1942	8,093		Harland & Wolff	Sunk 24 January 1943 by torpedo from U-105
British Vigour	1943	5,844		Furness Shipbuilding Company	The first vessel with a welded hull. Sold in 1959 and renamed Thoronet. Scrapped in 1964.
British Vine	1901	7,474		Swan Hunter	Launched as the Patrician. In 1914 acquired by the Admiralty and converted to the dummy battleship HMS Invincible. In 1915 she was fitted with oil tanks and transferred to the RFA as the RFA Tarakol. Transferred to the Shipping Controller in 1917 and renamed Vineleaf. Purchased 1919. Sold in 1923 and renamed Busen. Scrapped in 1935.
British Virtue	1945	8,500		Swan Hunter	Scrapped in 1962
British Viscount	1880	3,287		Oswald, Mordaunt & Co, Southampton	Ex Rock Light acquired 1917. Sunk 23 February 1918 by torpedo from U-91
British Viscount	1921	6,895		Swan Hunter	Sunk 3 April 1941 by torpedo from U-73
British Wisdom	1945	8,130		Blythswood Shipbuilding	Scrapped in 1962.
British Workman	1922	6,994		Workman, Clark & Co	Sunk 3 May 1942 by torpedo from U-455
British Yeoman	1923	6,990		Palmers Shipbuilding & Iron Company	Sunk 15 July 1942 by torpedo from U-201
British Zeal	1937	8,532		Lithgows	Damaged 31 December 1940 by torpedo from U-65, but survived. Sold 1958 and renamed Redwijs I. Scrapped in 1959
Empire Gem	1941	8,139		Harland & Wolff	Operated for the MoWT. Torpedoed and sunk 24 January 1941 by U-66.
Empire Metal	1942	8,201		Harland & Wolff	Operated for the MoWT. Sunk 2 January 1943 by air attack.
Eupion	1914	3575		Mackay Brothers	Sunk 3 Oct 1918 by torpedo from UB-90
Ferrara	1880	1,175		Robert Steele & Company	Taken over from parent company in 1915. Sold to India 1923 and gutted by fire later the same year.
Josefina Thorden	1932	6,620		Eriksberg Mekaniske Verkstad	Operated for the MoWT 1941. Mined and sunk 6 Apr 1943.
Kura	1889	2,391		Armstrong & Mitchell Co	Purchased 1918, sold 1924 to Italy and renamed Persiano. Sunk by torpedo from HMS Tetrarch in 1941
Kerman	1907	4,397		Flensburger Schiffsbouw Ges., Flensburg	Ex Furth. A second freighter acquired in 1915 after capture by the Royal Navy to carry cased oil. 1920 sold and renamed Sultania. Scrapped in 1933.
Khuzistan	1924	871		Amble Shipbuilding Company	Freighter adapted to carry cased oil. Sold 1953 and renamed Effigyny. Scrapped in 1959.
Melpomene	1923	7,011		Ateliers & Chantiers De La Gironde, Bordeaux	Operated for the MoWT. Sunk 5 March 1942 by torpedo from the Italian submarine Giuseppe Finzi.
Mexican Prince	1893	3028		Swan Hunter	Acquired 1918. Sold 1919 and renamed Southern Isles. Resold 1930 and renamed Silva Porto. Scrapped in 1937.
Oltania II	1928	6,394		Armstrong Whitworth	Operated for the MoWT. Sunk 8 January 1943 by torpedo from U-436.
Rion	1889	2,186		Palmers Shipbuilding & Iron Company	Purchased 1918, sold 1924 and renamed Italiano. Resold 1925 and renamed Federico Garolla, sank after an explosion at sea in 1930
Saint Patrice					Acquired and disposed of in 1922.
Suram	1893	2,186		Sir James Laing & Sons	Purchased 1918, sold and renamed Bithnia 1920, scrapped in 1931.
Scandinavia	1905	456		N. V. Werf V. Rijkee & Company, Rotterdam	Schooner, the only sailing vessel in the BTC fleet. Acquired 1917. Scrapped in 1923 after being wrecked at Portland
Taraqqi	1930	388		G. Brown & Company, Greenock	Coaster adapted to carry cased oil. Sold in 1955. Resold in 1967 and again in 1973 and renamed Tara Q. Deleted from Lloyd's Register in 1998.
War Nawab	1919	5,586		Palmers Shipbuilding & Iron Company	Operated for the Shipping Controller. Transferred to Admiralty in 1921, then to RFA in 1936, scrapped 1958.
War Nizam	1918	5,605		Palmers Shipbuilding & Iron Company	Operated for the Shipping Controller. Transferred to Admiralty in 1921, then to RFA in 1937, scrapped 1949.
War Sudra	1920	5,599		Palmers Shipbuilding & Iron Company	Operated for the Shipping Controller. Transferred to Admiralty in 1921. Sold 1948, renamed Germaine in 1951, scrapped 1954.

=== Fleet list 1945 to 1956 ===
Ship	Built	GRT	Photo	Built by	Notes
Beecher Island	1944	10,668		Alabama Drydock and Shipbuilding Company	T2 tanker purchased 1947, scrapped in 1959.
British Admiral	1947	8,378		Furness Shipbuilding Company	Scrapped in 1962.
British Adventure	1951	18,573		Vickers Armstrong	The first "Supertanker". Sold 1973 and renamed Vrahos. Scrapped 1975.
British Advocate	1948	8,573		Lithgows	Scrapped in 1962.
British Ardour	1949	8,616		Swan Hunter	Scrapped in 1962.
British Baron	1947	8,556		Cammell Laird	Scrapped in 1962.
British Birch	1951	8,688		Sir James Laing & Sons	Scrapped in 1964.
British Builder	1951	8,699		William Doxford & Sons	Scrapped in 1963.
British Bulldog	1951	18,593		Swan Hunter	Scrapped in 1972.
British Captain	1949	8,700		Harland & Wolff	Scrapped in 1962.
British Caution	1945	8,552		Swan Hunter	Scrapped in 1961.
British Chancellor	1954	11,356		Blythswood Shipbuilding	Transferred to BP Clyde Tanker Co in 1961 and renamed Clyde Chancellor. In 1964 reverted to BP Tanker Company and resumed original name. Scrapped in 1972.
British Chivalry	1949	11,217		Blythswood Shipbuilding	Transferred to BP Clyde Tanker Co in 1958 and renamed Clyde Chivalry. In 1963 reverted to BP Tanker Company and resumed original name. Scrapped in 1972.
British Commander	1950	8,655		Harland & Wolff	Scrapped in 1962.
British Commerce	1946	6,092		William Doxford & Sons	Scrapped in 1961.
British Consul	1950	8,655		Harland & Wolff	Scrapped in 1963.
British Corporal	1954	10,071		Harland & Wolff	Transferred to BP Clyde Tanker Co in 1957 and renamed Clyde Corporal. In 1964 reverted to BP Tanker Company and resumed original name. Scrapped in 1972.
British Councillor	1948	8,573		Lithgows	Scrapped in 1967.
British Craftsman	1951	8,697		William Doxford & Sons	Scrapped in 1964.
British Crown	1952	18,570		Cammell Laird	Scrapped in 1966 after an explosion and fire.
British Crusader	1954	11,346		Cammell Laird	Transferred to BP Clyde Tanker Co in 1957 and renamed Clyde Crusader. In 1964 reverted to BP Tanker Company and resumed original name. Scrapped in 1972.
British Defender	1950	6,138		William Doxford & Sons	Sold 1965 and renamed El Flamingo. 1969 rebuilt as a suction dredger. Scrapped in 1982.
British Diplomat	1950	6,155		William Doxford & Sons	Scrapped in 1961.
British Duke	1948	8,562		Cammell Laird	Scrapped in 1962.
British Earl	1946	8,745		Swan Hunter	Hit a mine off Denmark in 1947 which required major repairs. Scrapped in 1961.
British Empress	1947	8,745		Furness Shipbuilding Company	Scrapped in 1961.
British Endeavour	1949	8,589		R. & W. Hawthorn, Leslie & Company	Scrapped in 1962.
British Engineer	1954	21,077		Harland & Wolff	1972 sold and renamed Petrola V. Scrapped in 1976.
British Ensign	1947	8,738		Furness Shipbuilding Company	Scrapped in 1961.
British Enterprise	1946	6,095		William Doxford & Sons	Scrapped in 1961.
British Envoy	1953	11,349		William Doxford & Sons	Transferred to BP Clyde Tanker Co in 1958 and renamed Clyde Envoy. In 1963 reverted to BP Tanker Company and resumed original name. Scrapped in 1970.
British Escort	1943	8,908		Swan Hunter	Laid down as British Virtue but taken over by the MoWT and launched as the merchant aircraft carrier Empire MacCabe. Purchased and renamed in 1946. Scrapped in 1962.
British Explorer	1950	8,644		Harland & Wolff	Transferred to BP Clyde Tanker Co in 1958 and renamed Clyde Explorer. Scrapped in 1964.
British Fame	1949	11,203		Swan Hunter	Scrapped in 1971.
British Fern	1947	8,582		Sir James Laing & Sons	Scrapped in 1961.
British Flag	1953	11,327		R. & W. Hawthorn, Leslie & Company	Scrapped in 1971.
British Fortune	1949	6,108		William Doxford & Sons	Scrapped in 1961.
British Freedom	1950	11,207		Swan Hunter	Scrapped in 1972.
British General	1950	8,775		Furness Shipbuilding Company	Scrapped in 1964.
British Guardian	1953	11,359		Lithgows	Transferred to BP Clyde Tanker Co in 1958 and renamed Clyde Guardian. In 1963 reverted to BP Tanker Company and resumed original name. Scrapped in 1972.
British Guide	1951	8,778		Furness Shipbuilding Company	Scrapped in 1963 after being in collision with Ocean Enterprise.
British Gunner	1954	10,076		Harland & Wolff	Transferred to BP Clyde Tanker Co in 1961 and renamed Clyde Gunner. In 1964 reverted to BP Tanker Company and resumed original name. Scrapped in 1972.
British Hero	1954	11,358		Lithgows	Scrapped in 1972.
British Holly	1946	8,582		Sir James Laing & Sons	Scrapped in 1964.
British Isles	1947	8,738		Furness Shipbuilding Company	Scrapped in 1962.
British Knight	1946	8,629		Harland & Wolff	Scrapped in 1961.
British Lady	1951	6,140		Smiths Dock Company.	Scrapped in 1963.
British Liberty	1949	8,589		William Doxford & Sons	Scrapped in 1964.
British Loyalty	1949	8,592		William Doxford & Sons	Scrapped in 1967.
British Major	1946	8,564		William Doxford & Sons	Scrapped in 1962.
British Maple	1951	8,686		Sir James Laing & Sons	Scrapped in 1965.
British Mariner	1948	8,576		Harland & Wolff	Scrapped in 1962 after colliding with and sinking the Palmyra off Ushant.
British Marquis	1946	8,563		William Doxford & Sons	Scrapped in 1962.
British Marshall	1946	8,582		William Doxford & Sons	Scrapped in 1961.
British Merchant	1954	21,064		Swan Hunter	1973 sold and renamed Petrola VII. 1976 resold and renamed Petrola 7. Scrapped in 1978.
British Navigator	1951	6,135		JL Thompson & Sons	Scrapped in 1964.
British Oak	1953	11,307		Smiths Dock Company	Scrapped in 1972.
British Officer	1954	11,362		William Hamilton and Company, Glasgow	Scrapped in 1973.
British Patriot	1950	8,661		Lithgows	Scrapped in 1963.
British Patrol	1954	11,380		Swan Hunter	1973 sold and renamed Maripatrol. 1980 resold and renamed Nona Maro. Suffered a fire and explosion at Flushing in 1980. Scrapped in 1981
British Peer	1950	8,661		Lithgows	Scrapped in 1963.
British Pilot	1943	9,133		Laird, Son & Co., Birkenhead	Laid down as British Caution but taken over by the MoWT and launched as the merchant aircraft carrier Empire MacColl. Purchased and renamed in 1946. Scrapped in 1962
British Pioneer	1951	8,651		Blythswood Shipbuilding Company, Glasgow	Transferred to BP Clyde Tanker Co in 1958 and renamed Clyde Pioneer. Scrapped in 1965.
British Piper	1945	8,238		Harland & Wolff	Laid down as Empire Grenada but completed for BTC in 1946. Scrapped in 1961.
British Pluck	1945	930		Harland & Wolff	Ex Empire Tesella. Managed for MoWT. Purchased 1951 and scrapped in 1954.
British Premier	1951	8,661		Lithgows	Scrapped in 1964.
British Princess	1946	8,582		Sir James Laing & Sons	The ship was launched by Elizabeth II. Scrapped in 1962.
British Progress	1948	8,577		Blythswood Shipbuilding Company, Glasgow	Scrapped in 1963.
British Prospector	1950	8,655		Harland & Wolff	Transferred to BP Clyde Tanker Co in 1958 and renamed Clyde Prospector. Scrapped in 1964.
British Prudence	1949	8,577		Blythswood Shipbuilding Company, Glasgow	Scrapped in 1966.
British Ranger	1948	8,575		Harland & Wolff	Transferred to BP Clyde Tanker Co in 1957 and renamed Clyde Ranger. Scrapped in 1963.
British Realm	1952	18,571		Fairfield Company	Scrapped in 1970.
British Reliance	1950	11,201		Sir James Laing & Sons	1973 sold and renamed Bangor Bay. 1974 resold and renamed Ocean Princess. Scrapped in 1975.
British Resource	1949	11,200		R. & W. Hawthorn, Leslie & Company	Scrapped in 1972.
British Rover	1951	6,137		JL Thompson & Sons	1961 sold and renamed Makeni Palm. 1967 resold and renamed Kerkennah. 1971 renamed Palau. Scrapped in 1976.
British Rose	1946	6,101		JL Thompson & Sons	Scrapped in 1961.
British Sailor	1953	20.961		John Brown & Company, Clydebank	1972 sold and renamed Marisira. 1974 resold and renamed Fagr. Scrapped in 1980.
British Scientist	1948	8,545		Cammell Laird	Transferred to BP Clyde Tanker Co in 1957 and renamed Clyde Scientist. Scrapped in 1963.
British Seafarer	1951	11,220		R. & W. Hawthorn, Leslie & Company	Scrapped in 1973.
British Sergeant	1954	10,073		Harland & Wolff	Transferred to BP Clyde Tanker Co in 1960 and renamed Clyde Sergeant. In 1963 reverted to BP Tanker Company and resumed original name. Scrapped in 1972.
British Security	1948	8,583		Harland & Wolff	Sold 1966 and renamed Mana. Resold 1967 and renamed Ypatia. Wrecked off Mozambique in 1968 and scrapped in 1969.
British Skill	1952	18,550		Harland & Wolff	Scrapped in 1972.
British Soldier	1954	21,082		John Brown & Company, Clydebank	1972 Sold and renamed Maribruna. Scrapped in 1976.
British Sovereign	1954	21,138		Vickers-Armstrong	1972 sold and renamed Petrola VI. 1976 renamed Petrola 6. Scrapped in 1977.
British Splendour	1950	11,233		Swan Hunter	Scrapped in 1972.
British Sportsman	1951	11,231		Swan Hunter	Scrapped in 1972.
British Strength	1948	8,580		Harland & Wolff	Scrapped in 1966.
British Success	1945	8,215		Blythswood Shipbuilding	Laid up 1957. Scrapped in 1961.
British Supremacy	1945	8,242		Harland & Wolff	The first of the post-war ships. Scrapped 1962.
British Surveyor	1950	8,655		Harland & Wolff	Transferred to BP Clyde Tanker Co in 1961 and renamed Clyde Surveyor. Scrapped in 1964.
British Swordfish	1943	8,908		Harland & Wolff	Laid down as British Wisdom but taken over by the MoWT and launched as the merchant aircraft carrier Empire MacKay. Purchased and renamed in 1946. Scrapped in 1959.
British Talent	1952	18,593		R. & W. Hawthorn, Leslie & Company	Scrapped in 1972.
British Triumph	1949	8,640		Cammell Laird	Scrapped in 1956.
British Trust	1950	8,640		Cammell Laird	Transferred to BP Clyde Tanker Co in 1957 and renamed Clyde Inventor. Scrapped in 1963.
British Union	1950	8,663		Swan Hunter	Scrapped in 1962.
British Venture	1948	6,119		JL Thompson & Sons	Scrapped in 1961.
British Victory	1955	21,153		Vickers-Armstrong	1973 sold and renamed Marivic. Scrapped in 1977.
British Viscount	1951	8,664		Swan Hunter	Scrapped in 1965.
British Vision	1954	11,349		JL Thompson & Sons	Scrapped in 1972.
British Warrior	1951	6,143		JL Thompson & Sons	1961 sold and renamed Anne. 1964 resold and renamed LSCO Pandacan. scrapped in 1977.
British Workman	1949	8,575		Harland & Wolff	In 1960 collided with and sank the Mongabara in fog off the German coast. Scrapped in 1967.
British Yeoman	1949	8,741		Furness Shipbuilding Company	Scrapped in 1963.
Chisholm Trail	1944	10,660		Alabama Drydock and Shipbuilding Company	T2 tanker purchased 1947, sold 1955 and renamed Montsoreau. Scrapped after collision in 1961.
Cottonwood Creek	1944	10,647		Alabama Drydock and Shipbuilding Company	T2 tanker purchased 1947, sold 1955 and renamed Brissac. Sold 1959 and renamed Bulk Mariner but reverted to original name in 1960. Sold 1965, wrecked and abandoned 1970.
El Morro	1944	10,673		Kaiser Company	T2 tanker purchased 1947, scrapped in 1959.
Fort Frederika	1944	10,672		Kaiser Company	T2 tanker purchased 1947, scrapped in 1959.
Fort Stevens	1944	10,639		Alabama Drydock and Shipbuilding Company	T2 tanker purchased 1947, scrapped in 1959.
Iran	1943	798		Grangemouth Dockyard Company	Ex Empire Settler purchased 1947. Renamed Widad in 1958. Sold in 1962 and renamed Motol VII. Scrapped in 1968.
Mesa Verde	1944	10,660		Kaiser Company	T2 tanker purchased 1947, sold 1955 and renamed Villandry. Scrapped in 1961.
Pazan	1942	438		Greifenwerft G.m.b.H., Stettin	Ex Luftwaffe August. Acquired by AIOC in 1948, renamed Angliran 20 and transferred to PSSC. Transferred to BTC in 1949. Sold in 1956 and renamed Southern Pioneer. Scrapped after an explosion and fire at Mombasa in 1964.
Red Bank	1944	10,639		Alabama Drydock and Shipbuilding Company	T2 tanker purchased 1947, sold 1959 and renamed Bank. Scrapped in 1960.
Rogue River	1944	10,647		Alabama Drydock and Shipbuilding Company	T2 tanker purchased 1947, sold 1959 and renamed Hunsfors. Renamed Apache in 1960. Sold 1968 and renamed Pacmerchant. Scrapped in 1977.
Smoky Hill	1944	10,448		Kaiser Company	T2 tanker purchased 1947, sold 1957. Scrapped in 1967.

== Subsidiary companies ==
A number of second-hand ships weren't integrated into the main fleet but were operated by subsidiary companies, often a single ship per company. These vessels were not renamed into the British sequence. The principal subsidiary companies were The Petroleum Steam Ship Company, The Lowland Tanker Company and the jointly owned Shell-Mex & BP.

== House flag ==
The first house flag consisted of the black letters BTC set in a white circle on a white horizontal band, the white bordered with black, all set against a red background.

In 1926/7 the flag was changed to include the Persian colours. This new house flag consisted of the red Cross of Saint George on a white background, with a large green lozenge imposed over the centre of the cross, the lozenge containing a golden lion 'passant guardant'; the lion being a symbol of Persia. This remained until 1954, when a red lion 'rampant' replaced the golden lion.

1915-1927

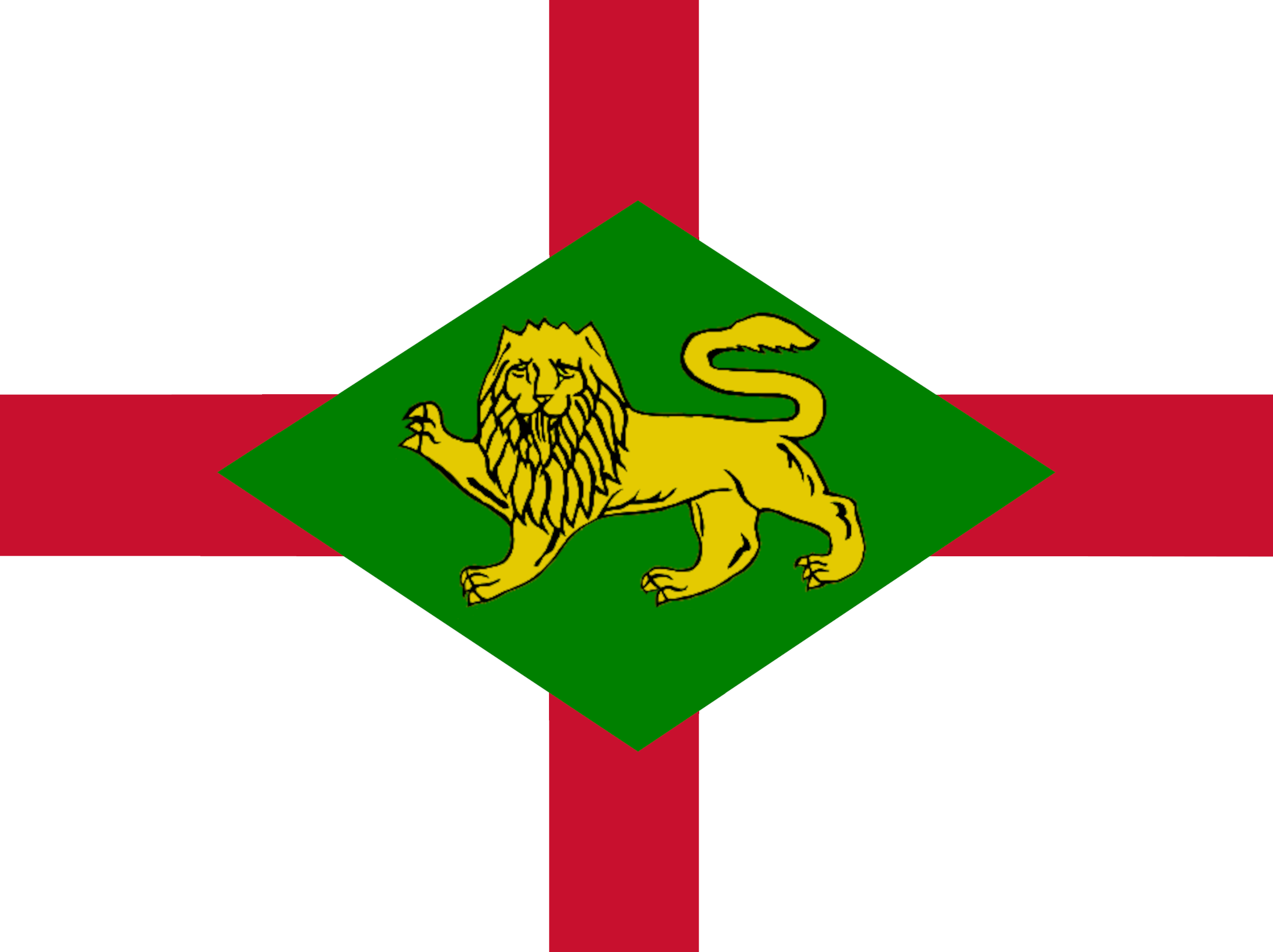
1927-1955

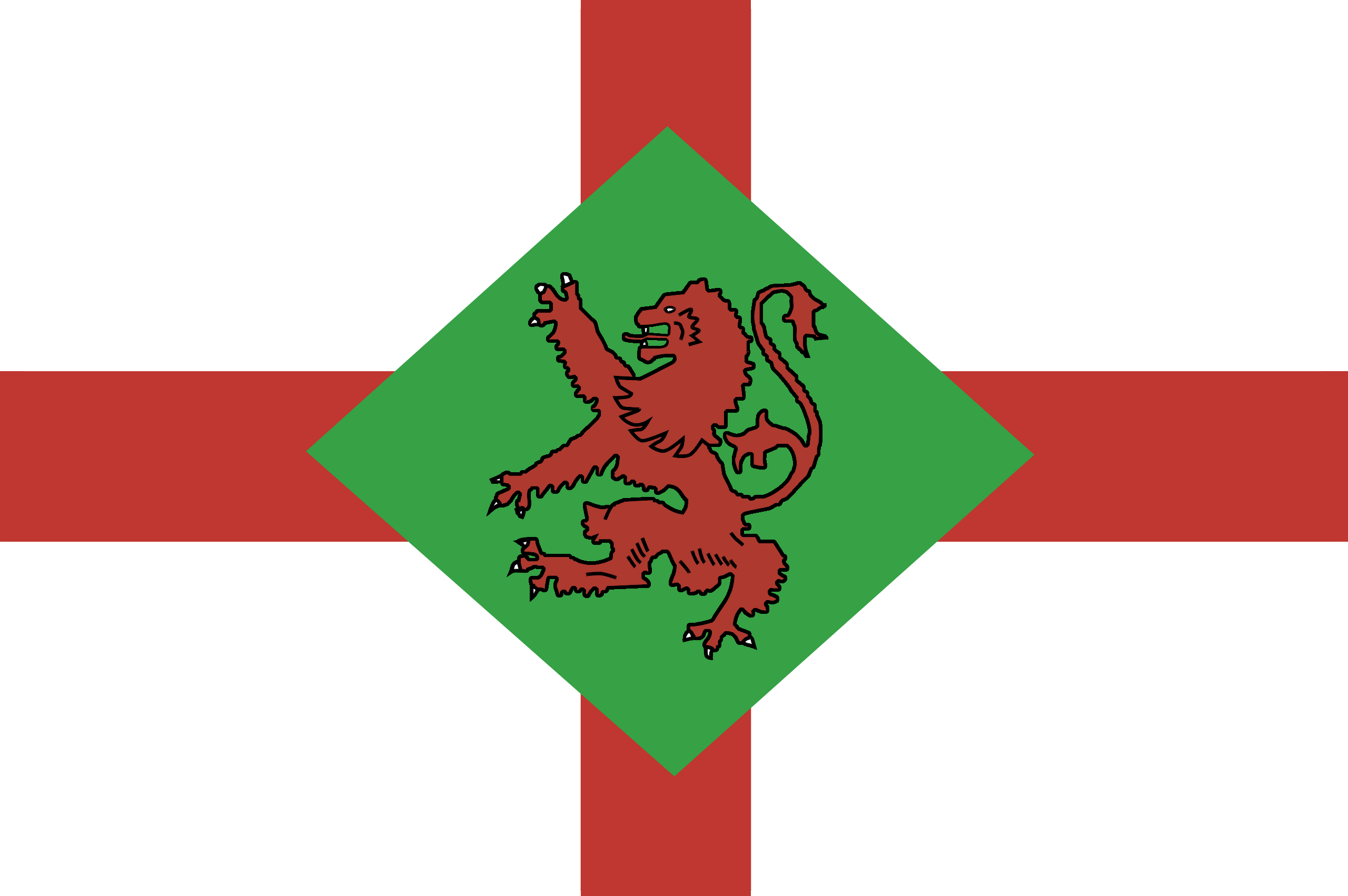
1955-1968 and 1984-1989

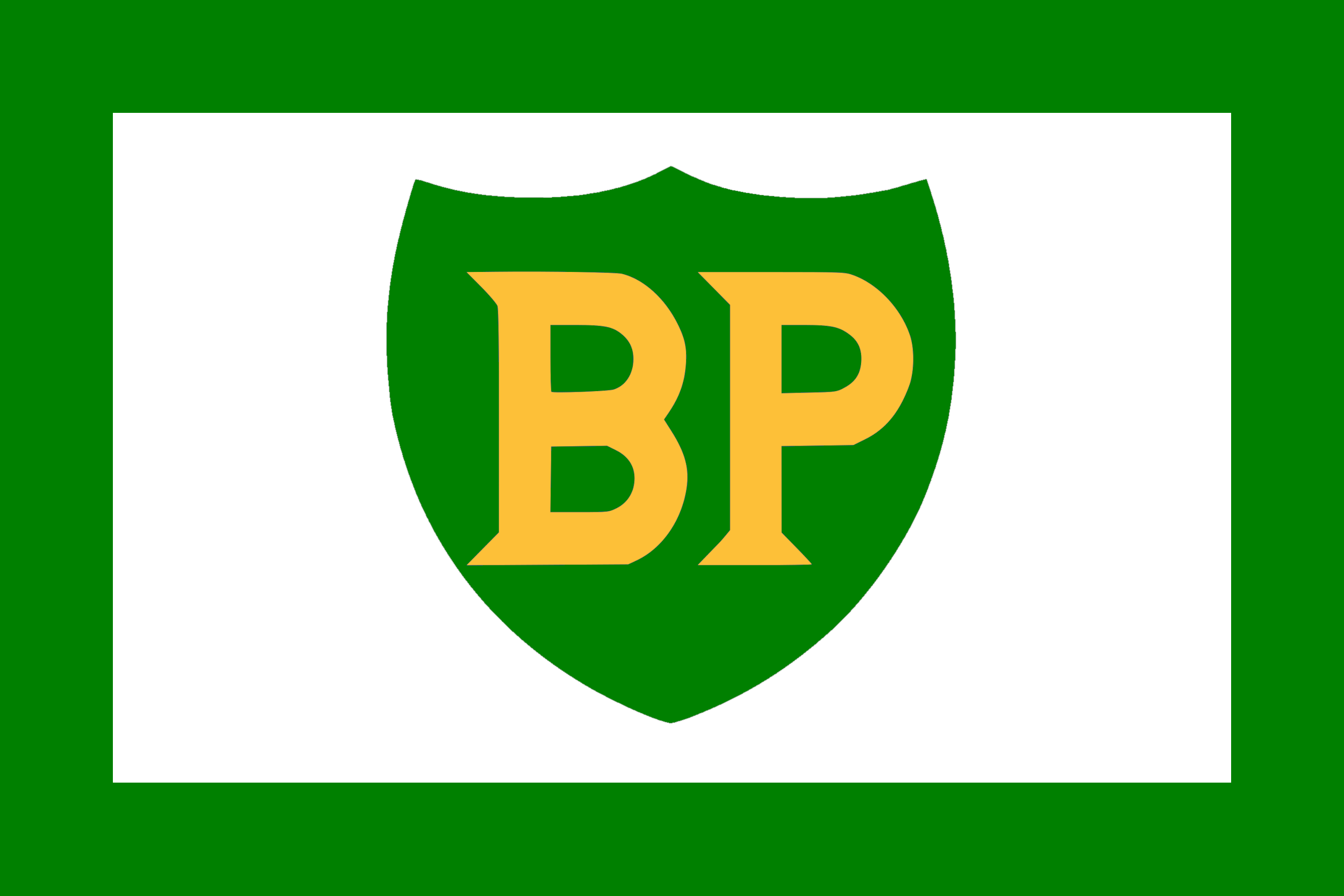
1968-1984

== Sources ==
- National Archives, Kew
- BP Magazine Issue 2, 2009: page 24
- Lloyd's shipping registers
- Harvey, WJ; Solly, Dr RJ (2005). BP Tankers: A Group Fleet History. London: Chatham Publishing. ISBN 978-1-86176-251-1.
- Ferrier, RW (1982). The History of the British Petroleum Company. Vol. 1 The Developing Years, 1901–1932. Cambridge: Cambridge University Press. pp. 292–294. ISBN 978-0-521-24647-7.
