= MV British Diplomat =

Three motor vessels operated by the British Tanker Company were named British Diplomat

- MV British Diplomat (1926), in service until 1940, requisitioned by the Ministry of War Transport and renamed Empire Diplomat. Scrapped in 1946
- MV British Diplomat (1950), built by Doxfords
- MV British Diplomat (1963)
