= Lowland Tanker Company =

- Type: Subsidiary
- Industry: Shipping
- Founded: 1950
- Founders: William Keswick & Robert Gillespie
- Defunct: 1979
- Fate: Defunct
- Parent: British Tanker Company (50%); Matheson (25%); Common Brothers (25%)

The Lowland Tanker Company was a British shipping company operating a small fleet of oil tankers on time-charter to BP.

== History ==
In 1950 the British Tanker Company (BTC), for managerial and economic reasons, formed a separate associated company to operate ten oil tankers exclusively for BP cargos. BTC owned 50% of the company with 25% owned by Matheson, the maritime arm of Jardine Matheson, and 25% by the Newcastle ship-owners, Common Brothers, the latter company being tasked with the management of the ships. A further five ships were bought in the early 1960s. The ships were taken over by the BP Tanker Company, successors to BTC, in 1976 with the minority shareholders in the company being bought out by BP in 1979.

== Ships ==
The first ten ships were constructed in the traditional style with the bridge and accommodation block in the centre of the ship and the engine rooms aft. The last five were built in what is now the standard layout, with all the superstructure aft leaving the tank deck clear. To distinguish them from BTC's own ships they had a tartan band painted on the funnel. After BPTC took them in-house the band was retained but with a BP logo superimposed on it.

=== Fleet list ===
Ship	In BTC Service	DWT	Notes
MV Border Regiment	1952–1969	16,897	Sold and renamed Fortuity. Scrapped 1975.
MV Border Keeper	1953–1970	16,000	Disposed 1970
MV Border Lass	1953–1970	16,548	Sold and renamed Mikrasaitis. Resold 1974 and renamed Juanita H. Scrapped 1975.
MV Border Fusilier	1954–1970	17,405	Sold and renamed Nemeo. Scrapped 1975
MV Border Hunter	1954–1970	15,950	Sold and renamed Nereide. Scrapped 1975.
MV Border Minstrel	1954–1972	17,154	Scrapped 1972.
MV Border Laird	1955–1972	16,000	Scrapped 1972.
MV Border Reiver	1955–1970	17,405	Sold and renamed Nicea. Scrapped 1976.
MV Border Sentinel	1955–1970	15,968	Sold and renamed Nettuno. Scrapped 1976.
MV Border Terrier	1956–1972	16,028	Scrapped 1972.
MV Border Pele	1960–1976	20,784	Sold 1981 and renamed Five Streams. Scrapped 1984.
MV Border Shepherd	1960–1976	20,914	Sold and renamed Mariverda IV. 1983 resold and renamed Al Nabila II. Scrapped 1993.
MV Border Castle	1961–1976	19,925	Sold and renamed Five Brooks. Attacked and set on fire by Iranian gunboats in 1986. Scrapped 1987.
MV Border Chieftain	1961–1976	19,999	Sold and renamed Achillett. 1987 resold and renamed Spiro. Scrapped 1988.
MV Border Falcon	1961–1976	19,949	Sold and renamed Gardenia B. Scrapped 1985.
