= British Consul =

British Consul may refer to:

- The consul who represents Great Britain in various foreign countries
- SS British Consul, a tanker sunk during the Second World War
