= British Petrol =

British Petrol may refer to:

- British petrol, any petrol (gasoline) produced or owned by British companies
- British Petroleum Company, now called just BP
- British Petrol, an oil tanker in the fleet of the British Tanker Company
