= Mantinia =

Mantinia may refer to:

- Mantinia, an alternative spelling of Mantineia, Greece
- MV Mantinia, a tank ship in service with the Greek Tanker Shipping Co, Piraeus from 1963 to 1977
