= Empire Fusilier =

Empire Fusilier was the name of two British merchant ships during the Second World War:

- MV Empire Fusilier, an 8,202 GRT tanker, completed as Empire Bombardier
- SS Empire Fusilier, a 5,404 GRT cargo ship built in 1919 as Mincio and seized in June 1940 when war was declared against Italy
