= Montmajour =

Montmajour may refer to:-

- Montmajour Abbey, in the Bouches du Rhône, France.
- MV Montmajour, a tanker in service with the Compagnie d'Armement Maritime, Djibouti from 1958 to 1963.
