= SS British Corporal =

British tanker ship

History

United Kingdom
- Name: British Corporal (1922-42); Empire Corporal (1942)
- Owner: British Tankers Ltd (1922-40); Ministry of War Transport (1940-42)
- Operator: British Tanker Company (1922-42)
- Port of registry: London, United Kingdom
- Builder: Palmers Shipbuilding and Iron Co Ltd
- Yard number: 923
- Launched: May 1922
- Out of service: 14 August 1942
- Identification: United Kingdom Official Number 146561; Code Letters KMDG (1922-34); Code Letters GJFV (1934-42)
- Fate: Torpedoed and sunk

General characteristics
- Class & type: Tanker
- Tonnage: 6,972 GRT; 10,817 DWT
- Length: 440 ft 0 in (134.11 m)
- Beam: 57 ft 1 in (17.40 m)
- Draught: 33 ft 11 in (10.34 m)
- Depth: 26 ft 7 in (8.10 m)
- Installed power: Two steam turbines, double reduction geared
- Propulsion: Screw propeller
- Crew: 45 + 10 DEMS gunners (Empire Corporal)

Location of the sinking of Empire Corporal off Cuba.

British Corporal was a 6,972 GRT tanker that was built in 1922 by Palmers Shipbuilding and Iron Company, Jarrow, Northumberland, United Kingdom. She was built for the British Tanker Company.

In 1940, she was damaged in an attack by German E-boats. She was transferred to the British Ministry of War Transport (MoWT) and renamed Empire Corporal. She returned to service in 1942 following repairs, but was torpedoed and sunk on 18 August by U-598 off the coast of Cuba.

== Description ==
The ship was built in 1922 by Palmers Shipbuilding and Iron Co Ltd, Jarrow, Northumberland. She was 440 feet 0 inches (134.11 m) long, with a beam of 57 feet 1 inch (17.40 m). She had a depth of 33 feet 9 inches (10.29 m) and a draught of 26 feet 7 inches (8.10 m). She was assessed at 6,972 GRT. 4,072 NRT. Her DWT was 10,817.

The ship was propelled by two steam turbines, double reduction geared and driving a single screw propeller. The turbines were built by Palmers.

== History ==
British Corporal was built for the British Tanker Company. She was launched in May 1922. The United Kingdom Official Number 146561 and Code Letters KMDG were allocated. Her port of registry was London. She was employed on routes between the United Kingdom and the Middle East, as shown by her occasional mentions in The Times in connection with one of her crew being stabbed to death in Port Said, Egypt, in October 1928, and a report of her having trouble with her condenser at Port Said in February 1932. In 1934, her Code Letters were changed to GFJV. On 6 November 1934, British Corporal ran aground at Swansea, Wales. She was refloated the next day undamaged.

=== Spanish Civil War ===
At 05:15 on 6 August 1937, British Corporal was attacked by three Spanish Nationalist aircraft when she was 30 nautical miles (56 km) west of Algiers, Algeria (36°53′N 2°52′E), whilst on a voyage from Abadan, Iran, to the United Kingdom with a cargo of petrol. The attack lasted an hour, with both bombs and machine guns being used. British Corporal was only slightly damaged, with her radio being put out of action for a time. The Italian steamship Mongioia was also attacked. None of the crew of British Corporal were injured. Following the incident, she put into Algiers. Two reconnaissance aircraft were despatched from Algiers to search for the attackers. The French Djebel Amour and Greek K Ktistakis were attacked off Algiers the following day. On departing from Algiers, British Corporal was escorted by HMS Hussar.

Following the attack, the British Government made diplomatic protests to Spanish anti-Government forces then involved in the Spanish Civil War. Rear-Admiral Wells, of the Third Cruiser Squadron, raised the issue with naval authorities at Palma, Majorca, who admitted that their aircraft had been involved. They claimed the ship had not been displaying any colours, which was denied by the British. This information was passed back to London, which ordered British Ambassador to Spain Sir Henry Chilton to raise the issue at the Nationalist headquarters in Salamanca. Markings on the aircraft that attacked British Corporal were those of Nationalist forces. General Franco denied that his aircraft had been involved, and further denied that the naval authorities in Palma had admitted involvement. The French Government announced that it would provide escort for French ships sailing between Algeria and Marseille. The British stated that prompt assistance would be given by the Royal Navy to any British ship under attack. They also informed the Spanish that any aircraft attacking British shipping was liable to be shot down.

=== World War II ===
During the Second World War, British Corporal was a member of a number of convoys. In July 1940, she was part of Convoy OA 178. On 4 July 1940, British Corporal was attacked by S-Boats S-20 and S-26 in the English Channel (50°13′N 02°35′W), being hit in the stern by a torpedo. Later that day, she was dive-bombed by Junkers Ju 87 aircraft of Sturzkampfgeschwader 2 and severely damaged. British Corporal was anchored at Portland, Dorset, and later towed to Southampton, Hampshire, arriving on 20 July. She had been on a voyage from Hull, Yorkshire, to Abadan and was in ballast. Following the attack, the Germans claimed that they had sunk a 12,000-ton tanker and a 6,000-ton merchant ship, whereas in fact they had damaged British Corporal and Hartlepool, a 5,000-ton merchant ship.

British Corporal was taken over by the British Ministry of War Transport (MoWT) and repaired, remaining under the management of her former owners. She was a member of Convoy ON 14, which departed Liverpool on 7 September 1941 and Loch Ewe on 10 September 1941. The convoy dispersed at sea on 15 September 1941. British Corporal was bound for New York, United States. She was commended by the Convoy Commodore for her good signalling and station keeping.

British Corporal was a member of Convoy HX 80, which departed Halifax, Nova Scotia, on 15 March 1942 and arrived at Liverpool on 27 March. She was carrying a cargo of aviation fuel. From HX 80, British Corporal joined Convoy UR 18, which departed from Loch Ewe on 27 March 1942 and arrived at Reykjavík, Iceland, on 7 April. She then joined Convoy PQ 14, which departed from Reykjavík on 8 April 1942 and arrived at Murmansk, Soviet Union, on 19 April. Due to thick fog and pack ice, British Corporal left the convoy to return to Iceland, joining Convoy QP 10 for the return and arriving at Akureyri on 18 April 1942. British Corporal joined Convoy RU 22, which departed Reykjavík on 7 May 1942 and arrived at Loch Ewe on 11 May. She was to proceed to Methil, Fife, for orders.

In mid-1942, the ship was renamed Empire Corporal. She was a member of Convoy ON 106, which departed Loch Ewe on 23 June 1942, bound for New York. On 9 August 1942, Empire Corporal departed Curaçao, Netherlands Antilles, for Key West, Florida. She was carrying a cargo of 4,532 tons of petrol and 4,745 tons of white spirit. She joined Convoy TAW 12J. At 11:57 on 14 August 1942, Empire Corporal was struck by a torpedo that had been fired by the German submarine U-598 and sank off Barlovento Point, Cuba (21°45′N 76°10′W) with the loss of six of her crew of 55, including ten DEMS gunners. The survivors were picked up by the United States Navy motor torpedo boat USS PT-498 and transferred to the U.S. Navy destroyer USS Fletcher. They were landed at Guantánamo Bay, Cuba.

Those lost on Empire Corporal are commemorated at the Tower Hill Memorial, London.
