= MV British Splendour =

Coordinates: 35°07′N 75°19′W

- MV British Splendour sometime during her career

History

- Name: MV British Splendour
- Owner: British Tanker Co., Ltd, London, England
- Builder: Palmers Shipbuilding & Iron, Co. Ltd. Jarrow and Hebburn-on-Tyne
- Launched: 20 November 1930
- Identification: United Kingdom Official Number 162546; Code Letters LGVD
- Fate: Sunk 7 April 1942, off Ocracoke, North Carolina

General characteristics
- Type: Oil tanker
- Tonnage: 7,138 GRT
- Length: 441 ft 2 in (134.47 m)
- Beam: 59 ft 7 in (18.16 m)
- Depth: 33 ft 0 in (10.06 m)
- Propulsion: Diesel
- Speed: 11 knots (20 km/h; 13 mph)

MV British Splendour was a British oil tanker which was torpedoed and sunk on 7 April 1942 during World War II by U-552. British Splendour was making her way from Houston, Texas to ultimately meet a British bound convoy off of Nova Scotia and deliver 10,000 tons of gasoline.

== History ==
The ship was a steel-hulled oil tanker built in 1931 by Palmers Shipbuilding & Iron Company for the British Tanker Company. She could travel at a speed of up to 11 knots.

== Wartime service ==
In 1939, British Splendour, along with her sister ships, was chartered by the British Government to transport fuel supplies for the armed forces.

On 20 February 1941, she was bombed and damaged by enemy aircraft one mile off South Black Head, having just left Falmouth. She was sunk 7 April 1942 by torpedo from U-552 off the coast of North Carolina.

=== Sinking ===
The tanker was carrying 10,000 tons of gasoline, which caught fire quickly when the torpedo hit. Out of the ship's 53 crew members, 12 died in the attack. Captain John Hail ordered the crew to abandon ship and the 41 survivors escaped on lifeboats and a raft. The trawler, HMS St Zeno, later rescued them from the sea and took them to Norfolk, Virginia.
