= MV British Prudence =

British tanker

History

United Kingdom
- Name: British Prudence
- Owner: British Tanker Company
- Port of registry: London
- Builder: Sir James Laing & Sons Ltd, Sunderland
- Yard number: 723
- Launched: 6 February 1939
- Completed: April 1939
- Out of service: 23 March 1942
- Identification: UK official number 167217; Call sign GPPP
- Fate: Sunk 23 March 1942

General characteristics
- Type: oil tanker
- Tonnage: 8,620 GRT, 4,903 NRT
- Length: 474.6 ft (144.7 m)
- Beam: 62.0 ft (18.9 m)
- Draught: 27 ft 8 in (8.43 m)
- Depth: 33.9 ft (10.3 m)
- Installed power: 687 NHP
- Propulsion: 4-cylinder single-acting 2-stroke diesel made by William Doxford & Sons of Sunderland
- Capacity: 11,500 tons
- Crew: 44 Merchant Navy plus 6 DEMS gunners
- Sensors & processing systems: wireless direction finding; echo sounding equipment

MV British Prudence was a tanker built by Sir James Laing & Sons Ltd. of Sunderland in 1939 and operated by the British Tanker Company. A U-boat sank her in 1942 off the coast of Newfoundland. She was a victim of the Second Happy Time: the Kriegsmarine's Operation Drumbeat to sink Allied merchant shipping in the Western Atlantic

== Sinking ==
On 21 March 1942 British Prudence sailed from Halifax, Nova Scotia carrying 11,500 tons of Admiralty fuel oil bound for St. John's, Newfoundland. She joined eastbound Convoy HX 181 but bad weather prevented the convoy from forming correctly. On 22 March the weather worsened with "hail and snow turning to rain, and the wind was south-east, increasing to gale force 7". Her master, Captain G.A. Dickson, saw ships in the convoy columns to port and starboard of British Prudence repeatedly converging in heavy seas, so at 2100 hrs. to avoid the risk of collision he reduced her speed.

Position off Newfoundland where U-754 sank British Prudence

At 1020 hrs. on 23 March the wind had moderated to a westerly force 4. At about 1050 hrs. a torpedo fired by Type VIIC U-boat U-754 hit British Prudence' starboard side amidships, causing extensive damage to No. 8 tank and the midships accommodation. The radio cabin collapsed through the Master's cabin, narrowly missing Captain Dickson who was in his dayroom.

Seconds later a second torpedo struck the starboard side of the stern, extensively damaging the engine room, which caught fire. The ship then began to sink by her stern. The engineer officer on watch and two members of the engine room crew were lost. The starboard stern motor lifeboat was blown out of her davits and broken in two. In the bow of the ship a fire broke out, fuelled by kerosene barrels and gas cylinders stored in the fo'c's'le. The crew abandoned ship in the port stern lifeboat and two midships lifeboats.

The stern sank until the bow became vertical, and then the ship sank completely at about 1115 hrs. The crew used sea anchors to keep the three lifeboats close together. Their position before being torpedoed was 45°28′N 56°13′W, and Captain Dickson estimated the boats were 400 nautical miles (740 km) or 500 nautical miles (930 km) from land. The survivors spent a cold, soaking wet night in heavy seas in the lifeboats.

== Crew rescue ==
On 23 March distress messages from the wireless operators on the lifeboats were received, and the W-class destroyer HMS Witherington from troopship convoy NA 006 was sent to the area. The survivors did not know this as the receiving part of their main radio had been lost.

On the morning of 24 March the lifeboats were fog-bound until about 1130 hrs. Shortly after the fog lifted, the crew sighted the destroyer and signalled her with flares and yellow signal flags. The Witherington rescued all the occupants of the lifeboats, and on 25 March landed them back at Halifax.

For Captain Dickson this was his second sinking in as many months. On 19 February he had been the Master of British Consul when she was torpedoed and sunk at Port of Spain, Trinidad. On 2 May 1942 Dickson returned safely to Glasgow as a passenger aboard the Furness Lines freighter Pacific Pioneer.

== Replacement ship ==
A replacement ship of the same name was built by the Blythswood Shipbuilding Company of Scotstoun, Glasgow and launched on 20 December 1948. She was similar in size and outward appearance to her predecessor, but her funnel was positioned further aft than on the 1939 ship.

== Sources ==
- Helgason, Guðmundur. "British Consul". uboat.net.
- Helgason, Guðmundur. "British Prudence". uboat.net.
- Letter from James Baillie at Grangemouth to Captain Waters, 2 May 1942
- Shipping Casualties Section – Trade Division Report of an Interview with the Master, Captain G.A. Dickson, SS [sic.] British Prudence, 12 May 1942, ref. TD/139/ 1230
