= SS British Chivalry =

British oil tanker sunk during World War II

History

United Kingdom
- Name: British Chivalry
- Owner: British Tanker Company
- Port of registry: London
- Builder: Palmers Shipbuilding and Iron Company, Jarrow
- Yard number: 979
- Launched: 24 January 1929
- Completed: February 1929
- Identification: Official number: 161198; Code letters: LCVK
- Fate: Sunk, 22 February 1944

General characteristics
- Type: Oil tanker
- Tonnage: 7,118 GRT; 4,238 NRT; 11,220 DWT
- Length: 440 ft 10 in (134.37 m)
- Beam: 57 ft 1 in (17.40 m)
- Depth: 33 ft 11 in (10.34 m)
- Propulsion: 553 nhp quadruple expansion steam engine, 1 screw
- Speed: 10 knots (19 km/h; 12 mph)

SS British Chivalry was a British oil tanker sunk by a Japanese submarine in the Indian Ocean in 1944.

== Construction ==
The steel-hulled ship was built by Palmers Shipbuilding and Iron Company of Jarrow in northern England for the British Tanker Company, the transportation arm of the Anglo-Persian Oil Company. Launched on 24 January 1929, the 7,118 GRT ship was 440 ft 10 in (134.37 m) long and 57 ft 1 in (17.40 m) in the beam, and powered by a 553 nhp quadruple expansion steam engine which gave her a top speed of 10 knots (19 km/h; 12 mph).

== Sinking ==
On 22 February 1944 British Chivalry was sailing alone in the Indian Ocean, south-west of Addu Atoll in the Maldive Islands, on a voyage from Melbourne to Abadan while in ballast. At 10.30 a.m. the ship was attacked by the Japanese submarine I-37, under the command of Lieutenant-Commander Nakagawa Hajime. The submarine first fired two torpedoes. These were spotted, and the ship took evasive action, so that one torpedo passed astern, but the second hit the ship in the engine room, killing most of the crew there. The survivors abandoned ship, as I-37 surfaced and shelled and finally torpedoed the ship, sinking her in position 00°50′S 68°00′E.

I-37 took the ship's captain, Walter Hill, as a prisoner. It then moved off and opened fire with machine guns on the lifeboats. For the next two hours it circled, firing indiscriminately at the lifeboats and men in the water before finally moving off. Fourteen men were killed and another five mortally wounded. The thirty-eight survivors were adrift for 37 days before finally being rescued by the British cargo liner MV Delane. Captain Hill was held as a prisoner at Penang until the end of the war.

In 1948 Lieutenant-Commander Nakagawa was tried by the War Crimes Tribunal for the murders of the crews of British Chivalry, and those of Sutlej on 24 February 1944, and Ascot on 29 February 1944.

He was found guilty and sentenced to eight years hard labour at Sugamo Prison, Tokyo, but was released in 1954 after only six years, following the end of the Allied occupation. It was not until 1978 that it was revealed that Nakagawa, while in command of the submarine I-177, had also been responsible for the sinking of the Australian hospital ship Centaur in April 1943, with the loss of 268 lives.

The men killed aboard British Chivalry are commemorated on Panel 19 of the Tower Hill Memorial in London.
