= MV British Diplomat (1963) =

MV British Diplomat, built 1963 by Ateliers et Chantiers, was a tanker ship in BP Shipping's UK fleet. Originally made in Dunkirk for French BP, it was taken into the UK BP fleet and registered with Lloyd's of London. The ship was a 55,00 DWT crude oil tanker sailing under the Red Ensign.
