= MV British Diplomat (1926) =

History
- Name: British Diplomat (1926-40); Empire Diplomat (1940-46)
- Owner: British Tanker Co Ltd (1926-40); Ministry of War Transport (1940-45)
- Operator: British Tanker Co Ltd
- Port of registry: London, United Kingdom
- Builder: J Brown & Co Ltd
- Yard number: 507
- Launched: 2 April 1926
- Completed: 1 July 1926
- Identification: United Kingdom Official Number 148786; Code Letters KVFG (1926-34); Code Letters GFRY (1934-46)
- Fate: Scrapped 1946

General characteristics
- Class & type: Tanker
- Tonnage: 6,448 GRT (1926-40); 6,498 GRT (1940-46); 4,521 NRT
- Length: 420 ft 2 in (128.07 m)
- Beam: 54 ft 4 in (16.56 m)
- Draught: 26 feet 4 1/4 inches (8.033 m)
- Depth: 32 ft 7 in (9.93 m)
- Installed power: 776 ihp (579 kW)
- Propulsion: 1 x 2SCSA Diesel engine

British Diplomat was a 6,498 GRT tanker that was built in 1926 by J Brown & Co Ltd, Clydebank, West Dunbartonshire, United Kingdom for the British Tanker Co Ltd. Relegated to use as a depot ship in Algeria by the time the Second World War stated, she was returned to the United Kingdom and transferred to the Ministry of War Transport (MoWT) in 1940, renamed Empire Diplomat. War service was spent in home waters. She served until 1946 when she was scrapped.

== Description ==
The ship was built in 1926 by J Brown & Co Ltd, Clydebank. She was yard number 507.

The ship was 420 feet 2 inches (128.07 m) long, with a beam of 54 feet 4 inches (16.56 m). She had a depth of 32 feet 7 inches (9.93 m) and a draught of 26 feet 4 1/4 inches (8.033 m). As built, she was assessed at 6,448 GRT, 4,521 NRT. Her DWT was 9,121.

The ship was propelled by a 776 nhp two-stroke Single Cycle Single Action diesel engine, which had eight cylinders of 22 15/16 inches (58.3 cm) diameter by 91 1/4 inches (232 cm) stroke. It drove twin screw propellers. The engine was built by J Brown & Co Ltd.

== History ==
Empire Diplomat was built for the British Tanker Co Ltd. She was launched on 2 April 1926, and completed on 1 July. Her port of registry was London. The Official Number 148786 and Code Letters KVFG were allocated. With the changes to Code Letters in 1934, British Diplomat was allocated the letters GFRY.

British Diplomat was still in service in December 1937, when she relayed a radio message from Orminster which was in difficulties off Algeria and had been taken under tow by British Power under Lloyds Open Form regulations. By 1939, she was in use as a depot ship at Oran, Algeria. She departed from Oran on 23 December 1939 for Gibraltar, arriving on 25 December. She left Gibraltar on 16 February 1940, returning the next day. British Diplomat was a member of Convoy HG 24, which departed from Gibraltar on 28 March and arrived at Liverpool, Lancashire, United Kingdom on 7 April. She detached from the convoy on 6 April at 49°57′N 2°35′W and sailed to the Isle of Portland, arriving that day. She sailed on 9 April for Southend, Essex, where she arrived on 11 April. She then joined Convoy FN 143, which departed on 12 April and arrived at Methil, Fife on 14 April. She left the convoy at the Tyne, where British Diplomat was to undergo a refit, and was renamed Empire Diplomat as she had been requisitioned by the MoWT. She was placed under the management of her former owners. She was assessed at 6,498 GRT.

Empire Diplomat departed from the Tyne on 7 August 1940, to join Convoy FN 244, which had departed from Southend on 6 August and arrived at Methil on 8 August. She spent the next four month sailing between Methil and Southend in convoys FS 269, FN 277A, FS 338, FN 344, and FS 359, which arrived at Southend on 15 December.

Empire Diplomat was out of service until April 1941, when she joined Convoy EC 11, which departed from Southend on 24 April and arrived at the Clyde on 29 April. She was to be used as a depot ship at Loch Alsh, Inner Hebrides, where she arrived on 27 April. She remained at Loch Alsh until October 1942, when she joined Convoy WN 352, which departed from Oban, Argyllshire on 22 October and arrived at Methil two days later. She then joined Convoy FS 943, which departed on 25 October and arrived at Southend on 27 October. She left the convoy at the Tyne on 26 October.

Empire Diplomat departed the Tyne on 23 November, joining Convoy FN 872, which had departed from Southend the previous day and arrived at Methil on 24 November. She then joined Convoy EN 166, which departed that day and arrived at Loch Ewe on 26 November. Empire Diplomat detached from the convoy an put into Invergordon, Ross-shire, arriving on 26 November. She subsequently sailed to Loch Alsh, where she was to remain for the next year. She sailed from Loch Alsh on 12 November 1943 for the Clyde, arriving the next day.

Empire Diplomat departed from the Clyde on 31 March 1944 for Milford Haven, Pembrokeshire, arriving two days later. She then joined Convoy WP 502, which departed on 4 April and arrived at Portsmouth, Hampshire on 6 April. She was a member of Convoy PW 505, which departed from Portsmouth on 11 April and arrived at Milford Haven on 13 April, then sailing on to the Clyde, where she arrived on 13 April. The next two months were spent sailing the west and south coasts of the United Kingdom, visiting Avonmouth the Clyde, Milford Haven, Newport, Portsmouth, Swansea and Southampton. Empire Diplomat departed from Newport on 19 June for Loch Ewe, arriving three days later. She then joined Convoy WN 599, which arrived at Methil on 25 June. British Diplomat was a member of Convoy FS 1494, which departed from Methil on 25 June and arrived at Southend on 27 June. She arrived at the Tyne on 26 June, where she was laid up. In August 1944, Empire Diplomat sailed to Milford Haven, arriving on 18 August. She was sold for scrap on 24 July 1945. Empire Diplomat was scrapped at Dunston-on-Tyne, Northumberland in 1946.
