= SS British Consul =

Coordinates: 11°58′N 62°38′W

History

United Kingdom
- Name: SS British Consul
- Operator: British Tanker Co. Ltd., London
- Port of registry: London
- Builder: Sir James Laing & Sons Ltd, Sunderland
- Launched: 30 September 1924
- Completed: November 1924
- Out of service: 19 August 1942
- Identification: UK Official Number 148511; Code Letters KRTC
- Fate: Sunk 19 August 1942

General characteristics
- Tonnage: 6,940 GRT; 6,449 tonnage under deck; 4,115 NRT
- Length: 435.0 feet (132.6 m)
- Beam: 57.3 feet (17.5 m)
- Draught: 27 ft 8 in (8.43 m)
- Depth: 33.8 feet (10.3 m)
- Installed power: 681 NHP
- Propulsion: 1 Palmers Co, Ltd 3-cylinder triple-expansion steam engine

SS British Consul was a tanker built by Sir James Laing & Sons Ltd., Sunderland in 1924 and operated by the British Tanker Company.

== Propulsion ==
British Consul was a steamship. She had nine corrugated furnaces heating three 180 lb_{f}/in^{2} single-ended boilers with combined heating surface of 8,634 square feet (802 m^{2}). These fed steam to her three-cylinder triple-expansion steam engine, which was built by Palmers Shipbuilding and Iron Company.

== First sinking ==
On the night of 18–19 February 1942 the ship was anchored in Port of Spain, Trinidad. She had been due to sail at midnight but submarines had been reported outside the port. The Royal Navy granted her Master, Captain G.A. Dickson, permission to defer sailing until 0400 hrs. as his crew would have a better chance of sighting submarines in daylight. Kapitänleutnant Albrecht Achilles of German submarine U-161 reported that he fired two stern-launched torpedoes into Port of Spain anchorage at 0532 hrs. and that one of these struck British Consul. Captain Dickson reports that the torpedo struck her "between the pumproom and the poop, starting a fire". All hands got away in the lifeboats and stood by under the bow. She sank in shallow water so the crew reboarded her. British Consul was salvaged and Captain Dickson transferred to New York where he was given command of MV British Prudence.

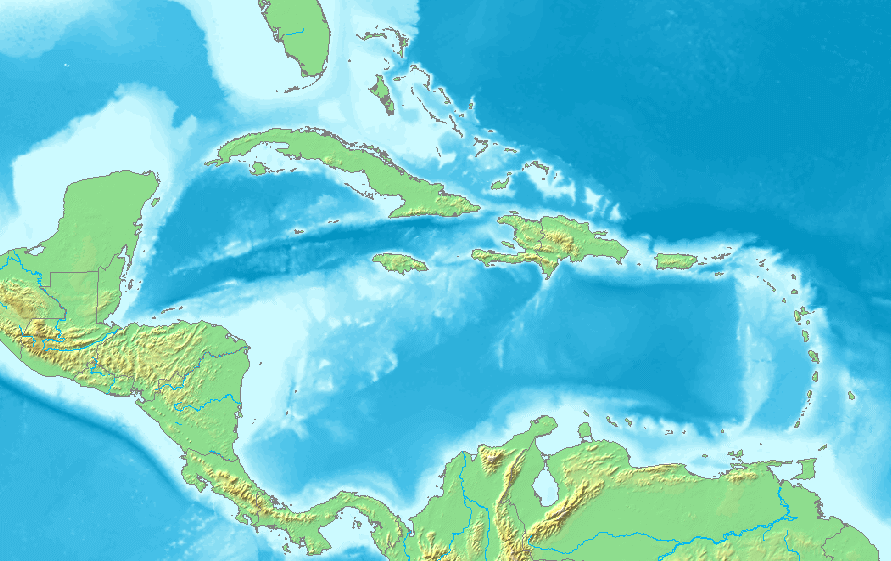
Position of British Consul's wreck

== Second sinking ==
In August 1942 British Consul, now commanded by Captain James Kennedy, joined Convoy TAW(S) from Trinidad via Curaçao to Key West. Kapitänleutnant Reinhard Suhren of German submarine U-564 reported that on the morning of 19 August 1942 he attacked the convoy and hit three ships including British Consul. Second Engineer Edwin John Angell, (who had been imprisoned below decks aboard the Admiral Graf Spee during the Battle of the River Plate) was lost. The survivors, including Captain James Kennedy, were rescued by the Flower-class corvette HMS Clarkia and landed at Guantánamo Bay, Cuba. This time British Consul could not be recovered.

== Replacement ship ==
A replacement ship of the same name was launched on 2 March 1950 at Harland & Wolff's Glasgow shipyard. At 8,655 gross tons the new British Consul was significantly larger than the original 1924 tanker.

== Sources ==
- Letter from James Baillie at Grangemouth to Captain Waters, 2 May 1942
