= German submarine U-598 =

German World War II submarine

History

Nazi Germany
- Name: U-598
- Ordered: 16 January 1940
- Builder: Blohm & Voss, Hamburg
- Yard number: 574
- Laid down: 11 January 1941
- Launched: 2 October 1941
- Commissioned: 27 November 1941
- Fate: Sunk by US aircraft on 23 July 1943

General characteristics
- Class & type: Type VIIC submarine
- Displacement: 769 tonnes (757 long tons) surfaced; 871 t (857 long tons) submerged
- Length: 67.10 m (220 ft 2 in) o/a; 50.50 m (165 ft 8 in) pressure hull
- Beam: 6.20 m (20 ft 4 in) o/a; 4.70 m (15 ft 5 in) pressure hull
- Height: 9.60 m (31 ft 6 in)
- Draught: 4.74 m (15 ft 7 in)
- Installed power: 2,800–3,200 PS (2,100–2,400 kW; 2,800–3,200 bhp) (diesels); 750 PS (550 kW; 740 shp) (electric)
- Propulsion: 2 shafts; 2 × diesel engines; 2 × electric motors
- Speed: 17.7 knots (32.8 km/h; 20.4 mph) surfaced; 7.6 knots (14.1 km/h; 8.7 mph) submerged
- Range: 8,500 nmi (15,700 km; 9,800 mi) at 10 knots (19 km/h; 12 mph) surfaced; 80 nmi (150 km; 92 mi) at 4 knots (7.4 km/h; 4.6 mph) submerged
- Test depth: 230 m (750 ft); Crush depth: 250–295 m (820–968 ft)
- Complement: 4 officers, 40–56 enlisted
- Armament: 5 × 53.3 cm (21 in) torpedo tubes (four bow, one stern); 14 × torpedoes or 26 TMA mines; 1 × 8.8 cm (3.46 in) deck gun (220 rounds); 1 x 2 cm (0.79 in) C/30 AA gun

Service record
- Part of: 8th U-boat Flotilla; 27 November 1941 – 30 June 1942; 6th U-boat Flotilla; 1 – 23 July 1942
- Identification codes: M 43 201
- Commanders: K.Kapt. Gottfried Holtorf; 27 November 1941 – 23 July 1943
- Operations: 4 patrols: 1st patrol: 7 July – 13 September 1942; 2nd patrol: 26 December 1942 – 8 February 1943; 3rd patrol: 6 March – 13 May 1943; 4th patrol: 26 June – 23 July 1943
- Victories: 2 merchant ships sunk (9,295 GRT); 1 merchant ship damaged (6,197 GRT)

German submarine U-598 was a Type VIIC U-boat of Nazi Germany's Kriegsmarine during World War II.

She carried out four patrols, was part of four wolfpacks and sank two ships; she also damaged one other.

The boat was sunk by depth charges from two US aircraft, off the Brazilian coast on 23 July 1943.

== Design ==
German Type VIIC submarines were preceded by the shorter Type VIIB submarines. U-598 had a displacement of 769 tonnes (757 long tons) when at the surface and 871 tonnes (857 long tons) while submerged. She had a total length of 67.10 m (220 ft 2 in), a pressure hull length of 50.50 m (165 ft 8 in), a beam of 6.20 m (20 ft 4 in), a height of 9.60 m (31 ft 6 in), and a draught of 4.74 m (15 ft 7 in). The submarine was powered by two Germaniawerft F46 four-stroke, six-cylinder supercharged diesel engines producing a total of 2,800 to 3,200 metric horsepower (2,060 to 2,350 kW; 2,760 to 3,160 shp) for use while surfaced, two Brown, Boveri & Cie GG UB 720/8 double-acting electric motors producing a total of 750 metric horsepower (550 kW; 740 shp) for use while submerged. She had two shafts and two 1.23 m (4 ft) propellers. The boat was capable of operating at depths of up to 230 metres (750 ft).

The submarine had a maximum surface speed of 17.7 knots (32.8 km/h; 20.4 mph) and a maximum submerged speed of 7.6 knots (14.1 km/h; 8.7 mph). When submerged, the boat could operate for 80 nautical miles (150 km; 92 mi) at 4 knots (7.4 km/h; 4.6 mph); when surfaced, she could travel 8,500 nautical miles (15,700 km; 9,800 mi) at 10 knots (19 km/h; 12 mph). U-598 was fitted with five 53.3 cm (21 in) torpedo tubes (four fitted at the bow and one at the stern), fourteen torpedoes, one 8.8 cm (3.46 in) SK C/35 naval gun, 220 rounds, and a 2 cm (0.79 in) C/30 anti-aircraft gun. The boat had a complement of between forty-four and sixty.

== Service history ==
The submarine was laid down on 11 January 1941 at Blohm & Voss, Hamburg as yard number 574, launched on 2 October 1941 and commissioned on 27 November under the command of Korvettenkapitän Gottfried Holtorf.

She served with the 8th U-boat Flotilla from 27 November 1941 for training and the 6th flotilla for operations from 1 July 1942 until her loss.

=== First patrol ===
U-598's first patrol began from Kiel on 7 July 1942. She headed for the Atlantic Ocean via the gap separating Iceland and the Faroe Islands. One man drowned while carrying out maintenance on hydroplanes and propellers in mid-Atlantic on 5 August.

She damaged the Standella, sank the Michael Jebsen and the Empire Corporal, all on 14 August northwest of Barlovento Point, Cuba. The Empire Corporal had, as the British Corporal, been damaged by a torpedo and bombs in the English Channel in 1940. She had been repaired and returned to service in 1942.

The boat arrived at St. Nazaire, in occupied France on 13 September.

=== Second and third patrols ===
U-598's second sortie was to the south of Greenland; it was relatively uneventful.

Her third foray also started and finished in St. Nazaire between March and May 1943.

=== Fourth patrol and loss ===
The boat departed St. Nazaire for the last time on 26 June 1943. On 23 July she was sunk by depth charges dropped by two US Navy PB4Y-1 Liberators of VB-107 near Natal (on the Brazilian coast) at position 04°05′S 33°23′W.

Forty-three men died with U-598; there were two survivors.

=== Wolfpacks ===
U-598 took part in four wolfpacks, namely:

- Jaguar (18 – 31 January 1943)
- Stürmer (11 – 20 March 1943)
- Seeteufel (23 – 30 March 1943)
- Meise (11 – 27 April 1943)

== Summary of raiding history ==
Date	Ship Name	Nationality	Tonnage (GRT)	Fate
14 August 1943	Empire Corporal	United Kingdom	6,972	Sunk
14 August 1943	Michael Jebson	United Kingdom	2,323	Sunk
14 August 1943	Standella	United Kingdom	6,197	Damaged

== Bibliography ==
- Busch, Rainer; Röll, Hans-Joachim (1999). German U-boat commanders of World War II : a biographical dictionary. Translated by Brooks, Geoffrey. London, Annapolis, Md: Greenhill Books, Naval Institute Press. ISBN 1-55750-186-6.
- Busch, Rainer; Röll, Hans-Joachim (1999). Der U-Boot-Krieg, 1939-1945: Deutsche U-Boot-Verluste von September 1939 bis Mai 1945 [German U-boat losses from September 1939 to May 1945] (in German). Vol. IV. Hamburg, Berlin, Bonn: Mittler. ISBN 3-8132-0514-2.
- Gröner, Eric; Jung, Dieter; Maass, Martin (1991). German Warships 1815-1945: U-boats and Mine Warfare Vessels. Vol. 2. Translated by Thomas, Keith; Magowan, Rachel. London: Conway Maritime Press. ISBN 0-85177-593-4.
- Kemp, Paul (1997). U-Boats Destroyed – German Submarine Losses in the World Wars. Arms & Armour. ISBN 1-85409-515-3.
