= HMS Rorqual =

HMS Rorqual has been the name of two Royal Navy submarines. A rorqual is a type of whale:

- HMS Rorqual (N74), a Grampus-class submarine launched in 1936
- HMS Rorqual (S02), a Porpoise-class submarine launched in 1956
