= SS British Drummer =

British GRT tanker built in 1945

History
- Name: Empire Ensign (1945–47); British Drummer (1947–57); Anella (1957–58); Norse Commander (1958–66)
- Owner: Ministry of War Transport (1945); Ministry of Transport (1945–47); British Tanker Co Ltd (1947-56); BP Tanker Co Ltd (1956–57); Rederi A/S Mimer & A/S Norfart (1957–58); Bucha, Godager & Co (1958–66)
- Operator: British Tanker Co Ltd (1947–56); BP Tanker Co Ltd (1956–57); Arne Blystad (1957–58); Bucha, Godager & Co (1958–66)
- Port of registry: London, United Kingdom (1945–57); Oslo, Norway (1957–66)
- Builder: J L Thompson & Sons Ltd
- Yard number: 102
- Launched: 16 December 1944
- Maiden voyage: 3 April 1945
- Out of service: 6 September 1966
- Identification: United Kingdom Official Number 180152 (1945–57); Code Letters GDMS (1945–57)
- Fate: Scrapped

General characteristics
- Class & type: Cargo ship (oil tanker, refined products)
- Tonnage: 3,750 GRT; 1,897 NRT; 5,143 DWT
- Length: 344 ft (105 m)
- Beam: 48 ft (15 m)
- Propulsion: 3 cylinder Doxford vertically opposed heavy oil engine
- Speed: 12 knots (22 km/h)
- Capacity: 243,401 cubic feet (6,892.3 m^{3}) tank space

British Drummer was a 3,750 GRT tanker built in 1945 as Empire Ensign by J L Thompson & Son Ltd, Sunderland, Co Durham, United Kingdom for the Ministry of War Transport (MoWT). She was sold into merchant service in 1947 and renamed British Drummer. A sale to Norway in 1957 saw her renamed Anella. In 1958, a further sale saw her renamed Norse Commander. In September 1966, she developed boiler defects that were deemed uneconomic to repair, and she was scrapped in November that year.

== Description ==
The ship was built in 1945 by J L Thompson & Son Ltd, Sunderland, Co Durham. She was yard number 120.

The ship was 344 feet (105 m) long, with a beam of 48 feet (15 m). She was assessed at 3,750 GRT, 1,897 NRT, 5,143 DWT. Her tanks had a capacity of 243,401 cubic feet (6,892.3 m^{3}) of cargo.

The ship was propelled by a triple cylinder Doxford Heavy oil engine, with vertically opposed pistons, which could propel the ship at 11 knots (20 km/h).

== History ==
Empire Ensign was built for the MoWT. She was placed under the management of the British Tanker Co Ltd, London. The United Kingdom Official Number 180152 was allocated. Her Code Letters were GDMS.

Empire Ensign made her maiden voyage on 3 April 1945, when she departed from Sunderland, Co Durham to join Convoy FS 1775, which had departed from Methil, Fife that day and arrived at Southend, Essex on 5 April. On 7 April, she joined Convoy OS 121 KM, which had departed from the Clyde that day and split at sea on 14 April. Empire Ensign was in the part of the convoy which formed Convoy KMS 96G and arrived at Gibraltar on 16 April. She departed from Gibraltar on 20 April for Bizerta, Algeria, where she arrived three days later. She sailed on 25 April for Piraeus, Greece, where she arrived on 28 April. On 2 May, she sailed for Port Said, Egypt, arriving two days later. She then sailed to Suez, from where she departed on 7 May for Aden.

Empire Ensign arrived at Aden on 12 May. She then sailed to Colombo, Ceylon, from where she departed on 20 May for Calcutta, India, arriving on 25 May. A round trip was made to Madras, arriving back at Calcutta on 10 June before sailing for Madras on 15 June. She arrived at Madras three days later and departed for Chittagong on 21 June, arriving on 24 June. Empire Ensign sailed on 1 July for Madras, arriving five days later and departing that day for the Park Strait, from where she sailed on 9 July for Calcutta, arriving four days later. She sailed on 23 July for Colombo, arriving on 22 August and sailing two days later for Vizag, India, where she arrived on 3 September. She sailed the next day for Madras, arriving two days later. Empire Ensign departed on 1 October for Port Swettenham, Malaya, arriving on 15 October. She sailed on 3 November for Singapore, arriving the next day.

In 1947, Empire Ensign was sold to the British Tanker Co Ltd, London and was renamed British Drummer. On 28 May 1947, British Drummer was in port at Haifa, Palestine being loaded with benzine when there was an attack aimed at two water tanks, which the attackers may have thought contained fuel. British Drummer was 75 yards (69 m) from the site of the attack. In 1956, she was sold to BP Tankers Ltd, London.

In 1957, British Drummer was sold to Rederi A/S Mimer & A/S Norfart, Oslo, Norway. She was renamed Anella and placed under the management of Arne Blystad, Oslo. In 1958, Anella was sold to Bucha, Godager & Co, Oslo and renamed Norse Commander. In 1959, she was chartered to Esso for use between Fawley Refinery, Hampshire, United Kingdom and Mode Wheel Locks on the Manchester Ship Canal. In 1961, she was carrying fish oil from Iceland. On 9 September 1965, Norse Commander caught fire whilst under repair in a drydock at the Albert Dock, Tanjong Pagar, Singapore. The fire was quickly extinguished and little damage was done. A reporter and cameraman from The Straits Times were refused access to the dock by the Singapore Port Authority, which claimed that the reporter "might interfere with the firefighting operation, speak to the wrong people and write the wrong report". The port authority later handed out an official press release. The Straits Times commented in an editorial that the ban of its reporter was "censorship of the very worst kind, bureaucracy in its stupidest mood". In 1966, Norse Commander suffered boiler defects. She arrived under tow at Singapore on 6 September. Repairs were deemed to be uneconomic, and she was sold to the Hong Huat Hardware Co, Singapore for scrapping. She arrived at their yard on 12 November 1966.
