= MV Empire Chapman =

World War II merchant ship of the United Kingdom

History
- Name: Empire Chapman (1942-46); British Commando (1946-59)
- Owner: Ministry of War Transport (1942-46); British Tanker Co Ltd (1946-59)
- Operator: Sir R Ropner & Co Ltd (1942-44); British Tanker Co Ltd (1944-59)
- Port of registry: (United Kingdom) Belfast (1942-46); (United Kingdom) London (1946-59)
- Builder: Harland & Wolff
- Yard number: 1080
- Launched: 17 January 1942
- Completed: 25 June 1942
- Identification: Code Letters BDXV; United Kingdom Official Number 168512
- Fate: Scrapped 1959

General characteristics
- Class & type: Tanker
- Tonnage: 8,194 GRT; 4,777 NRT
- Length: 465 ft 6 in (141.88 m)
- Beam: 59 ft 5 in (18.11 m)
- Depth: 33 ft 8 in (10.26 m)
- Installed power: 4SCSA diesel engine
- Propulsion: Screw propeller
- Armament: Anti-torpedo nets (Empire Chapman)

Empire Chapman was an 8,194 GRT tanker which was built in 1942 by Harland & Wolff, Belfast for the Ministry of War Transport (MoWT). In 1946 she was sold into merchant service and renamed British Commando. She was scrapped in 1959.

== Description ==
The ship was built by Harland & Wolff Ltd, Belfast. She was launched in 1942 and completed on 25 June 1942.

The ship was 465 feet 6 inches (141.88 m) long, with a beam of 59 feet 5 inches (18.11 m) and a depth of 33 feet 8 inches (10.26 m). She had a GRT of 8,194 and a NRT of 4,777.

The ship was propelled by a 4-stroke Single Cycle Single Acting diesel engine, which had eight cylinders of 25 9/16 inches (64.9 cm) diameter by 55 1/8 inches (140 cm) stroke. The engine was built by Harland & Wolff.

== History ==
Empire Chapman was built for the MoWT. She was placed under the management of Sir R Ropner & Co Ltd. Her port of registry was Belfast. The Code Letters BDXV and United Kingdom Official Number 168512 were allocated.

Empire Chapman was a member of a number of convoys during the Second World War.

HX 239

Convoy HX 239 departed from New York on 13 May 1943 and arrived at Liverpool on 28 May. Empire Chapman was bound for the Stanlow Refinery, Ellesmere Port. She was equipped with Anti-torpedo nets.

HX 298

Convoy HX 298 departed from New York on 3 July 1944 and arrived at Liverpool on 18 July. Empire Chapman was bound for the Stanlow Refinery.

In 1944, Empire Champan was placed under the management of the British Tanker Co Ltd. In 1946, Empire Chapman was sold to the British Tanker Co Ltd and was renamed British Commando. Her port of registry was changed to London. She served until 1959 when she was scrapped at Bruges, Belgium.
