= BP Shipping =

Maritime arm of global oil company

- Formerly: BP Tanker Company
- Industry: Shipping
- Predecessor: British Tanker Company
- Founded: 1956
- Headquarters: Sunbury-on-Thames, England
- Area served: Europe; Iran; India; Singapore; Chicago
- Revenue: £1.4 billion (2024)
- Net income: £212 million (2024)

BP Shipping is the maritime arm of British headquartered global oil company, BP. The unit covers the marine transport, logistics and insurance requirements of all BP's global activities.

Formed in 1956 as the BP Tanker Company, its roots go back to the British Tanker Company, which was formed to carry products for the Anglo-Persian Oil Company. It is hence the oldest continuous business unit in the BP group. The company changed its name to BP Shipping in 1981 to encompass its marine insurance activities, and in 2006 transported 251.7 million tonnes of crude and products, representing around 5% of the world's sea borne oil movements

== Origins ==
=== British Tanker Company ===
British Emperor, launched in 1916

Having initially employed independent contractors to carry its oil from Persia (now Iran) back to Europe and into India, in April 1915 the Anglo-Persian Oil Company (APOC) set up the British Tanker Company (BTC) in April 1915, with an initial capital of £100,000. The BTC placed orders with two Tyneside based shipbuilders, Armstrong Whitworth and Swan Hunter, for a total of seven steam-powered oil tankers.

The BTC's first tanker was the 3,663 gross tonnage British Emperor, launched in 1916. The names of all the first seven ships bore the prefix "British", and all future additions to the fleet have followed the same naming convention. The 60th ship was the new flagship, the 6,998 gross tonnage British Aviator, BTC's first diesel engined oil tanker, and was at that time the most powerful single-screw motor ship in the world.

Through steadying of relationships with the Shah of Iran, APOC managed to strengthen its position within the industry during the Great Depression. With the outbreak of World War II in 1939, the British government chartered the BTC's whole fleet of 93 vessels, to transport fuel for its armed forces. The fleet lost 41 ships sunk during the war, with two others so badly damaged they could only be used as storage hulks.

=== BP Tanker Company ===
In November 1954, APOC renamed itself the British Petroleum Company, and in 1956 the BTC became the BP Tanker Company (BPTC). By the end of the 1950s, the BPTC's fleet stood at 146 vessels, including supertankers of 38,000 gross tonnage (67,000 deadweight tonnes), with plans to build tankers of 60,000 gross tonnage (100,000 deadweight tonnes), which would hold more than 25 million US gallons (95,000 m^{3}) of crude oil. A significant development of the tanker fleet was seen in the building of the British Admiral, the first 100,000 dwt tanker built in Europe and launched at Barrow-in-Furness in 1965 by Elizabeth II.

In 1981 the company was renamed BP Shipping Limited to reflect its changing role in managing the tanker fleet.

== Operations ==
Today, while BP Shipping remains responsible within the group for all water-born logistics, much of its fleet capacity is gained through hiring other operators vessels. The result is that it is also responsible for marine assurance on everything that is sited within or floats on water.

Employing 2,800 people based mainly in London, Singapore and Chicago, at the end of 2006 BP Shipping managed:

- 57 vessels - four Very Large Crude Carriers (VLCCs), one North Sea shuttle tanker, 42 medium size crude and product carriers, seven liquefied natural gas (LNG) carriers and three new liquefied petroleum gas (LPG) carriers
- 24 regional vessels, including coasters
- 100 hydrocarbon-carrying vessels above 600 deadweight tonnes on time charter

Resulting in:

- The shipping of 270 million tonnes of cargo volume
- 7,000 voyages, of which at any time 450-500 cargoes are "on the water"
- On average two thirds of shipments are made by seagoing tankers, the rest via inland and harbour barges

The marine insurance activity covers 800-900 miscellaneous craft such as tugs, crew boats, barges and seismic vessels used in support of BP group business around the world. All are vetted, with policy being that BP Shipping considers a vessel to be unacceptable unless positively identified otherwise. Of the 4,700 inspections in 2006, half resulted in an initial rejection.

Other marine holdings include:

- BP Shipcare: a lay-up facility located in East Malaysia
- Alaska Tanker Company: minority shareholding in four purpose-built ships of 110,693 GT retained on time charter to transport crude oil from Alaska to US west coast ports. The ships are Alaskan Legend, Alaskan Explorer, Alaskan Frontier and Alaskan Navigator.
- China LNG Shipping: 40% shareholding in ship management service to LNG carriers serving the Guangdong LNG terminal

== Fleet ==
=== Retired ships ===
Class	Builder	Type	Ships	Flag	Port of Registry	Service	Notes
	Daewoo Shipbuilding & Marine Engineering	Shuttle Tanker (DP2)	Loch Rannoch	United Kingdom	Lerwick, Shetland	1998–2013	Returned to owners, Knutsen OAS, September 2013
P Class	Samsung Heavy Industries	VLCC	British Pioneer	Isle of Man	Douglas, Isle of Man	1999–2011	Renamed Ridgebury Pioneer; Scrapped 2018
P Class	Samsung Heavy Industries	VLCC	British Pride	Isle of Man	Douglas, Isle of Man	2000–2016	Renamed Ridgebury Pride
P Class	Samsung Heavy Industries	VLCC	British Progress	Isle of Man	Douglas, Isle of Man	2000–2016	Renamed Ridgebury Progress
P Class	Samsung Heavy Industries	VLCC	British Purpose	Isle of Man	Douglas, Isle of Man	2000–2016	Renamed Ridgebury Purpose
Tree Class	Tsuneishi Shipbuilding	Aframax	British Beech	Isle of Man	Douglas, Isle of Man	2003–2015	renamed Sea Beech
Tree Class	Tsuneishi Shipbuilding	Aframax	British Hazel	Isle of Man	Douglas, Isle of Man	2004–2016	renamed Sea Hazel
Tree Class	Tsuneishi Shipbuilding	Aframax	British Holly	Isle of Man	Douglas, Isle of Man	2004–2016	renamed Sea Holly
Tree Class	Tsuneishi Shipbuilding	Aframax	British Vine	Isle of Man	Douglas, Isle of Man	2004–2016	renamed Sea Vine

=== Active ships ===
Class	Builder	Type	Ships in Class	Flag	Port of Registry	in Service	Notes
Bird Class	Samsung Heavy Industries	Aframax	British Osprey	Isle of Man	Douglas, Isle of Man	2003	
Bird Class	Samsung Heavy Industries	Aframax	British Swift	Isle of Man	Douglas, Isle of Man	2003	
Bird Class	Samsung Heavy Industries	Aframax	British Robin	Isle of Man	Douglas, Isle of Man	2003	
Bird Class	Samsung Heavy Industries	Aframax	British Curlew	Isle of Man	Douglas, Isle of Man	2004	
Bird Class	Samsung Heavy Industries	Aframax	British Cormorant	Isle of Man	Douglas, Isle of Man	2005	
Bird Class	Samsung Heavy Industries	Aframax	British Gannet	Isle of Man	Douglas, Isle of Man	2005	
Bird Class	Samsung Heavy Industries	Aframax	British Mallard	Isle of Man	Douglas, Isle of Man	2005	
Bird Class	Samsung Heavy Industries	Aframax	British Merlin	Isle of Man	Douglas, Isle of Man	2005	
Bird Class	Samsung Heavy Industries	Aframax	British Cygnet	Isle of Man	Douglas, Isle of Man	2005	
Bird Class	Samsung Heavy Industries	Aframax	British Falcon	Isle of Man	Douglas, Isle of Man	2006	
Bird Class	Samsung Heavy Industries	Aframax	British Eagle	Isle of Man	Douglas, Isle of Man	2006	
Bird Class	Samsung Heavy Industries	Aframax	British Kestrel	Isle of Man	Douglas, Isle of Man	2006	
E Class	Hyundai Mipo Dockyard	Medium Range Products Tanker	British Esteem	United Kingdom	London	2003	
E Class	Hyundai Mipo Dockyard	Medium Range Products Tanker	British Explorer	United Kingdom	London	2003	
E Class	Hyundai Mipo Dockyard	Medium Range Products Tanker	British Envoy	Isle of Man	Douglas, Isle of Man	2006	
E Class	Hyundai Mipo Dockyard	Medium Range Products Tanker	British Ensign	Isle of Man	Douglas, Isle of Man	2006	
E Class	Hyundai Mipo Dockyard	Medium Range Products Tanker	British Emissary	United Kingdom	London	2007	
Virtue Class	Hyundai Mipo Dockyard	Large Range Product Tanker	British Integrity	Isle of Man	Douglas, Isle of Man	2004	
Virtue Class	Hyundai Mipo Dockyard	Large Range Product Tanker	British Liberty	Isle of Man	Douglas, Isle of Man	2004	
Virtue Class	Hyundai Mipo Dockyard	Large Range Product Tanker	British Loyalty	Isle of Man	Douglas, Isle of Man	2004	
Virtue Class	Hyundai Mipo Dockyard	Large Range Product Tanker	British Security	Isle of Man	Douglas, Isle of Man	2004	
Virtue Class	Hyundai Mipo Dockyard	Large Range Product Tanker	British Tenacity	Isle of Man	Douglas, Isle of Man	2004	
Virtue Class	Hyundai Mipo Dockyard	Large Range Product Tanker	British Unity	Isle of Man	Douglas, Isle of Man	2004	
Virtue Class	Hyundai Mipo Dockyard	Large Range Product Tanker	British Fidelity	Isle of Man	Douglas, Isle of Man	2004	
Virtue Class	Hyundai Mipo Dockyard	Large Range Product Tanker	British Chivalry	Isle of Man	Douglas, Isle of Man	2005	
Virtue Class	Hyundai Mipo Dockyard	Large Range Product Tanker	British Courtesy	Isle of Man	Douglas, Isle of Man	2005	
Virtue Class	Hyundai Mipo Dockyard	Large Range Product Tanker	British Harmony	Isle of Man	Douglas, Isle of Man	2005	
Virtue Class	Hyundai Mipo Dockyard	Large Range Product Tanker	British Serenity	Isle of Man	Douglas, Isle of Man	2005	
Virtue Class	Hyundai Mipo Dockyard	Large Range Product Tanker	British Tranquility	Isle of Man	Douglas, Isle of Man	2005	
C Class	Mitsubishi Heavy Industries	Liquefied Petroleum Gas (LPG) Carrier	British Commerce	Isle of Man	Douglas, Isle of Man	2006	
C Class	Mitsubishi Heavy Industries	Liquefied Petroleum Gas (LPG) Carrier	British Courage	Isle of Man	Douglas, Isle of Man	2006	
C Class	Mitsubishi Heavy Industries	Liquefied Petroleum Gas (LPG) Carrier	British Councillor	Isle of Man	Douglas, Isle of Man	2007	
Trader Class	Samsung Heavy Industries	LNG carrier	British Trader	Isle of Man	Douglas, Isle of Man	2002	First Spot-market LNG carriers.
Trader Class	Samsung Heavy Industries	LNG carrier	British Innovator	Isle of Man	Douglas, Isle of Man	2002	First Spot-market LNG carriers.
Trader Class	Samsung Heavy Industries	LNG carrier	British Merchant	Isle of Man	Douglas, Isle of Man	2003	First Spot-market LNG carriers.
Gem Class	Hyundai Heavy Industries	LNG carrier	British Emerald	Isle of Man	Douglas, Isle of Man	2007	First Dual-Fuel Diesel-Electric (DFDE) LNG carriers.
Gem Class	Hyundai Heavy Industries	LNG carrier	British Diamond	Isle of Man	Douglas, Isle of Man	2008	First Dual-Fuel Diesel-Electric (DFDE) LNG carriers.
Gem Class	Hyundai Heavy Industries	LNG carrier	British Ruby	Isle of Man	Douglas, Isle of Man	2008	First Dual-Fuel Diesel-Electric (DFDE) LNG carriers.
Gem Class	Hyundai Heavy Industries	LNG carrier	British Sapphire	Isle of Man	Douglas, Isle of Man	2008	First Dual-Fuel Diesel-Electric (DFDE) LNG carriers.
	Kawasaki Heavy Industries	LNG carrier	Northwest Shearwater	Bermuda	Hamilton, Bermuda	1991	Vessel operated for North West Shelf Venture.
Barge	Breko Nieuwbouw	Lubricating Oil	Victoria	Netherlands	Rotterdam, Netherlands	2005	Operated by Verenigde Tankrederij
Barge	Breko Nieuwbouw	Lubricating Oil	Vanora	Netherlands	Rotterdam, Netherlands	2006	Operated by Verenigde Tankrederij
V Class	Daewoo Shipbuilding & Marine Engineering	VLCC	British Venture	Isle of Man	Douglas, Isle of Man	2013	
V Class	Daewoo Shipbuilding & Marine Engineering	VLCC	British Vantage	Isle of Man	Douglas, Isle of Man	2013	
R Class	STX Offshore & Shipbuilding	Aframax	British Respect	Isle of Man	Douglas, Isle of Man	2016	
R Class	STX Offshore & Shipbuilding	Aframax	British Resource	Isle of Man	Douglas, Isle of Man	2016	
R Class	STX Offshore & Shipbuilding	Aframax	British Regard	Isle of Man	Douglas, Isle of Man	2016	
R Class	STX Offshore & Shipbuilding	Aframax	British Renown	Isle of Man	Douglas, Isle of Man	2016	
R Class	STX Offshore & Shipbuilding	Aframax	British Rigour	Isle of Man	Douglas, Isle of Man	2016	
R Class	STX Offshore & Shipbuilding	Aframax	British Restraint	Isle of Man	Douglas, Isle of Man	2016	
R Class	STX Offshore & Shipbuilding	Aframax	British Reliance	Isle of Man	Douglas, Isle of Man	2016	
R Class	STX Offshore & Shipbuilding	Aframax	British Resolution	Isle of Man	Douglas, Isle of Man	2016	
R Class	STX Offshore & Shipbuilding	Aframax	British Reason	Isle of Man	Douglas, Isle of Man	2016	
Century Class	STX Offshore & Shipbuilding	Suezmax	British Century	Isle of Man	Douglas, Isle of Man	2017	
Century Class	STX Offshore & Shipbuilding	Suezmax	British Heritage	Isle of Man	Douglas, Isle of Man	2017	
Century Class	STX Offshore & Shipbuilding	Suezmax	British Tradition	Isle of Man	Douglas, Isle of Man	2017	
Mariner Class	Hyundai Mipo Dockyard	Product Tanker	British Mariner	Isle of Man	Douglas, Isle of Man	2016	
Mariner Class	Hyundai Mipo Dockyard	Product Tanker	British Navigator	Isle of Man	Douglas, Isle of Man	2016	
Mariner Class	Hyundai Mipo Dockyard	Product Tanker	British Seafarer	Isle of Man	Douglas, Isle of Man	2016	
Mariner Class	Hyundai Mipo Dockyard	Product Tanker	British Sailor	Isle of Man	Douglas, Isle of Man	2016	
Mariner Class	Hyundai Mipo Dockyard	Product Tanker	British Cadet	Isle of Man	Douglas, Isle of Man	2016	
Mariner Class	Hyundai Mipo Dockyard	Product Tanker	British Captain	Isle of Man	Douglas, Isle of Man	2017	
Mariner Class	Hyundai Mipo Dockyard	Product Tanker	British Chief	Isle of Man	Douglas, Isle of Man	2017	
Mariner Class	Hyundai Mipo Dockyard	Product Tanker	British Officer	Isle of Man	Douglas, Isle of Man	2017	
Mariner Class	Hyundai Mipo Dockyard	Product Tanker	British Engineer	Isle of Man	Douglas, Isle of Man	2017	
Cloud Class	Hyundai Mipo Dockyard	Handysize	British Cumulus	Isle of Man	Douglas, Isle of Man	2016	
Cloud Class	Hyundai Mipo Dockyard	Handysize	British Nimbus	Isle of Man	Douglas, Isle of Man	2016	
Cloud Class	Hyundai Mipo Dockyard	Handysize	British Stratus	Isle of Man	Douglas, Isle of Man	2017	
Cloud Class	Hyundai Mipo Dockyard	Handysize	British Altus	Isle of Man	Douglas, Isle of Man	2017	
Cloud Class	Hyundai Mipo Dockyard	Handysize	British Cirrus	Isle of Man	Douglas, Isle of Man	2017	
Partnership Class	Daewoo Shipbuilding & Marine Engineering	LNG carrier	British Partner	Isle of Man	Douglas, Isle of Man	2018	
Partnership Class	Daewoo Shipbuilding & Marine Engineering	LNG carrier	British Achiever	Isle of Man	Douglas, Isle of Man	2018	
Partnership Class	Daewoo Shipbuilding & Marine Engineering	LNG carrier	British Contributor	Isle of Man	Douglas, Isle of Man	2018	
Partnership Class	Daewoo Shipbuilding & Marine Engineering	LNG carrier	British Listener	Isle of Man	Douglas, Isle of Man	2019	
Partnership Class	Daewoo Shipbuilding & Marine Engineering	LNG carrier	British Mentor	Isle of Man	Douglas, Isle of Man	2019	
Partnership Class	Daewoo Shipbuilding & Marine Engineering	LNG carrier	British Sponsor	Isle of Man	Douglas, Isle of Man	2019	
