= MV Empire Arrow =

World War II merchant ship of the United Kingdom

History
- Name: Empire Arrow (1945-47); British Bugler (1947-58); Montmajour (1958-63); Mantinia (1963-81)
- Owner: Ministry of War Transport (1945-47); British Tanker Co. Ltd. (1947-58); Compagnie d'Armement Maritime, Djibouti (1958-63); Greek Tanker Shipping Co, Piraeus (1963-81)
- Operator: Owner operated except:- British Tanker Co (1945-47); C Diamantis, Greece (1963-78)
- Port of registry: (United Kingdom) Sunderland (1945-58); Djibouti (1958-63); (Greece) Piraeus (1963-81)
- Builder: J. L. Thompson & Sons Ltd., Sunderland
- Yard number: 641
- Launched: 27 April 1945
- Completed: August 1945
- Out of service: 1 January 1978
- Identification: IMO number: 5241075; UK Official Number 180161 (1945-58); Code letters GKFZ (1945-47)
- Fate: Scrapped June 1981

General characteristics
- Tonnage: 3,766 GRT
- Length: 343 ft 5 in (104.67 m)
- Beam: 48 ft 3 in (14.71 m)
- Depth: 26 ft 5 in (8.05 m)
- Propulsion: 2 x 3 cylinder SCSA oil engines

Empire Arrow was a 3,766 ton tanker which was built in 1945 for the Ministry of War Transport. She was renamed British Bugler in 1947. In 1958 she was renamed Montmajour and in 1963 was renamed Mantinia, serving until 1978 when she was laid up. She was scrapped in 1981.

== History ==
Empire Arrow was built by J.L. Thompson and Sons Ltd, Sunderland. She was yard number 641, launched on 27 April 1945 and completed in October of that year. She was built for the Ministry of War Transport and placed under the management of the British Tanker Company. In 1947, Empire Arrow was sold to her managers and renamed British Bugler. She served with them for a further eleven years and in 1958 was sold to the Compagnie d'Armement Maritime, Djibouti who renamed her Montmajour. In 1963, she was sold to the Greek Tanker Shipping Co, Piraeus and renamed Mantinia. She was operated under the management of C Diamantis. On 1 January 1978, Mantinia was laid up in Piraeus and in June 1978 she was scrapped at Kynosoúra.

== Official number and code letters ==
Official Numbers were a forerunner to IMO Numbers.

Empire Arrow had the UK Official Number 180161 and used the Code Letters GKFZ.
