= MV British Bombardier =

History
- Name: Empire Fusilier (1942); Empire Bombardier (1942-46); British Bombardier (1946-59)
- Owner: Ministry of War Transport (1942-46); British Tanker Co Ltd (1946-55); BP Tanker Company (1955-59)
- Operator: Dodd, Thomson & Co Ltd (1942-46); British Tanker Co Ltd (1946-55); BP Tanker Company (1955-59)
- Port of registry: (United Kingdom) Belfast (1943-46); (United Kingdom) London (1946-59)
- Builder: Harland & Wolff, Belfast
- Yard number: 1158
- Launched: 8 August 1942
- Completed: 18 February 1943
- Identification: UK Official Number 168521; Code Letters BFJY (1943-46)
- Fate: Scrapped 1959

General characteristics
- Tonnage: 8,202 GRT; DWT 4,781
- Length: 465 ft 6 in (141.88 m)
- Beam: 56 ft 6 in (17.22 m)
- Depth: 34 ft (10.36 m)
- Propulsion: 1 x 4SCSA diesel engine

British Bombardier was an 8,202 GRT tanker which was built in 1942 as Empire Fusilier and completed as Empire Bombardier. She was built for the Ministry of War Transport (MoWT); postwar, she was sold to British Tanker Co Ltd, serving until she was scrapped in 1959.

== Description ==
Empire Fusilier was built by Harland and Wolff Ltd, Belfast. She was yard number 1158, and was launched on 8 August 1942. She was completed in February 1943 as Empire Bombardier. The ship was 465 feet 6 inches (141.88 m) long, with a beam of 56 feet 6 inches (17.22 m) and a depth of 34 feet (10.36 m). She was propelled by a four stroke, Single Cycle Single Action diesel engine which had eight cylinders of 25 9/16 inches (64.9 cm) bore by 55 1/8 inches (140 cm) stroke. The engine was built by Harland & Wolff.

== Career ==
The MoWT placed Empire Bombardier under the management of Dodd, Thomson & Co Ltd. Her port of registry was Belfast. Empire Bombardier was a member of a number of convoys during the Second World War.

HX 242

Convoy HX 242 departed New York on 31 May 1943 and arrived at Liverpool on 15 June. Empire Bombardier was bound for the Stanlow Refinery, Ellesmere Port.

HX 304

Convoy HX 304 departed New York on 17 August 1944 and arrived at Liverpool on 1 September. Empire Bombardier was bound for Thameshaven.

In 1946, Empire Bombardier was sold to the British Tanker Co Ltd and renamed British Bombardier. Her port of registry was changed to London. In 1955, the British Tanker Company was renamed to BP Tanker Company. She served until 1959, when she was sold for scrap to a firm in Tamise, Belgium. She arrived for scrapping on 15 March 1959.

== Official Numbers and Code Letters ==
Official Numbers were a forerunner to IMO Numbers. The ship had the UK Official Number 168521. Empire Bombardier used the Code Letters BFJY. British Bombardier is recorded as using the same code letters in 1946.
